= Lamar Cardinals basketball statistical leaders =

The Lamar Cardinals basketball statistical leaders are individual statistical leaders of the Lamar Cardinals basketball program in various categories, including points, rebounds, assists, steals, and blocks. Within those areas, the lists identify single-game, single-season, and career leaders. The Cardinals represent Lamar University in the NCAA Division I Southland Conference.

Lamar began competing in intercollegiate basketball in 1951. The NCAA did not officially record assists as a stat until the 1983–84 season, and blocks and steals until the 1985–86 season, but La Salle's record books includes players in these stats before these seasons. These lists are updated through the end of the 2020–21 season.

== Scoring ==
Career
Rank	Player	Points	Seasons
1	Mike Olliver	2,518	1977–78 1978–79 1979–80 1980–81
2	B.B. Davis	2,084	1977–78 1978–79 1979–80 1980–81
3	James Gulley	1,832	1984–85 1985–86 1986–87 1987–88
4	Clarence Kea	1,814	1976–77 1977–78 1978–79 1979–80
5	Nick Garth	1,758	2015–16 2016–17 2017–18 2018–19
6	Atiim Browne	1,592	1990–91 1991–92 1992–93 1993–94
7	Tom Sewell	1,496	1981–82 1982–83 1983–84
8	Anthony Miles	1,487	2008–09 2009–10 2010–11 2011–12
9	Josh Nzeakor	1,359	2015–16 2016–17 2017–18 2018–19
10	Phil Endicott	1,349	1966–67 1967–68 1968–69 1969–70

Season
Rank	Player	Points	Season
1	Alan Daniels	730	2005–06
2	Mike Olliver	716	1978–79
3	Tom Sewell	710	1983–84
4	Mike Olliver	704	1979–80
5	Mike Olliver	670	1980–81
6	B.B. Davis	651	1978–79
7	Alan Daniels	576	2004–05
8	James Gulley	573	1986–87
9	Earl Dow	560	1968–69
10	Johnny Johnston	558	1960–61

Single game
Rank	Player	Points	Season	Opponent
1	Mike James	52	2010–11	Louisiana College
2	Mike Olliver	50	1979–80	Portland State
3	Don Heller	48	1963–64	McNeese State
4	Richard Smith	45	1961–62	Sul Ross State
5	Keith Veney	42	1992–93	Prairie View
6	Alan Daniels	41	2005–06	Memphis
	Keith Veney	41	1992–93	Arkansas-Little Rock
	Jerry McKeller	41	1966–67	UT Arlington
9	Alan Daniels	40	2005–06	Louisiana-Monroe
	Jerry McKeller	40	1966–67	Arkansas State

== Rebounds ==
Career
Rank	Player	Rebounds	Seasons
1	Clarence Kea	1,143	1976–77 1977–78 1978–79 1979–80
2	B.B. Davis	1,122	1977–78 1978–79 1979–80 1980–81
3	James Gulley	967	1984–85 1985–86 1986–87 1987–88
4	Don Bryson	931	1962–63 1963–64 1964–65
5	Lewis Arline	917	1999–00 2000–01 2001–02 2002–03
6	Kenneth Perkins	912	1980–81 1981–82 1982–83 1983–84
7	Johnny Johnston	908	1958–59 1959–60 1960–61
8	Josh Nzeakor	825	2015–16 2016–17 2017–18 2018–19
9	James Nicholson	750	1966–67 1967–68 1968–69 1969–70
10	Bob Thompson	729	1954–55 1955–56 1956–57

Season
Rank	Player	Rebounds	Season
1	Johnny Johnston	421	1960–61
2	Bob Shepherd	355	1959–60
3	B.B. Davis	344	1978–79
4	Don Bryson	343	1964–65
5	Clarence Kea	332	1978–79
6	Clarence Kea	328	1979–80
7	Odis Booker	324	1965–66
8	Lamar Sanders	315	2006–07
9	James Gulley	312	1987–88

Single game
Rank	Player	Rebounds	Season	Opponent
1	Odis Booker	28	1965–66	Texas Wesleyan
2	Steve Wade	27	1971–72	Oral Roberts
3	Don Bryson	26	1964–65	Southern Mississippi
4	Justin Nabors	24	2009–10	Louisiana College
	Adrian Caldwell	24	1988–89	Texas-Pan American
	Clarence Kea	24	1977–78	Texas Lutheran
	Luke Adams	24	1970–71	UT Arlington
	Don Bryson	24	1963–64	Trinity University
9	Odis Booker	23	1966–67	Central Missouri
	Johnny Johnston	23	1960–61	Louisiana-Monroe
	Bob Thompson	23	1954–55	Sul Ross State

== Assists ==
Career
Rank	Player	Assists	Seasons
1	Atiim Browne	641	1990–91 1991–92 1992–93 1993–94
2	Alvin Brooks	432	1979–80 1980–81
3	Anthony Miles	416	2008–09 2009–10 2010–11 2011–12
4	David Jones	411	1986–87 1987–88 1988–89 1989–90
5	Eddie Robinson	383	1999–00 2000–01 2001–02 2002–03
6	Mike Olliver	344	1977–78 1978–79 1979–80 1980–81
7	Lamont Robinson	304	1981–82 1982–83 1983–84
8	Lowell Hill	290	1970–71 1971–72 1972–73
9	Norman Bellard	277	1976–77 1977–78 1978–79
10	Terry Johnson	274	1994–95 1995–96
	Anthony Bledsoe	274	1987–88 1988–89 1990–91

Season
Rank	Player	Assists	Season
1	Alvin Brooks	249	1980–81
2	Atiim Browne	197	1991–92
3	Atiim Browne	195	1992–93
4	Alvin Brooks	183	1979–80
5	Lamont Robinson	150	1983–84
6	V.J. Holmes	149	2019–20
	Norman Bellard	149	1978–79
8	Terry Johnson	148	1994–95
9	Nimrod Hilliard	146	2013–14
10	Eddie Robinson	145	2001–02

Single game
Rank	Player	Assists	Season	Opponent
1	Alvin Brooks	21	1980–81	Texas-Pan American
2	Alvin Brooks	16	1979–80	Portland State
3	Nimrod Hilliard	14	2013–14	Arkansas State
	Jeremy Long	14	2004–05	Texas State
5	Joey Frenchwood	13	2016–17	Arlington Bapt.
	Terry Johnson	13	1994–95	South Alabama
	Atiim Browne	13	1992–93	Louisiana Tech
	Alvin Brooks	13	1979–80	UT Arlington

== Steals ==
Career
Rank	Player	Steals	Seasons
1	Atiim Browne	216	1990–91 1991–92 1992–93 1993–94
2	Mike Olliver	206	1977–78 1978–79 1979–80 1980–81
3	Anthony Bledsoe	176	1987–88 1988–89 1990–91
4	David Jones	166	1986–87 1987–88 1988–89 1989–90
5	Anthony Miles	146	2008–09 2009–10 2010–11 2011–12
6	Alvin Brooks	143	1979–80 1980–81
7	Norman Bellard	140	1976–77 1977–78 1978–79
8	Terry Johnson	136	1994–95 1995–96
9	Zjori Bosha	135	2014–15 2015–16 2016–17 2017–18
10	Alan Daniels	130	2004–05 2005–06

Season
Rank	Player	Steals	Season
1	Alvin Brooks	81	1979–80
2	Terry Johnson	73	1994–95
3	Alan Daniels	72	2005–06
4	V.J. Holmes	68	2019–20
	Norman Bellard	68	1978–79
6	Gil Goodrich	66	2003–04
7	Shawn Copes	65	1991–92
8	Jerry Everett	64	1984–85
9	Terry Johnson	63	1995–96
10	Anthony Bledsoe	62	1988–89

Single game
Rank	Player	Steals	Season	Opponent
1	Ellis Jefferson	11	2019–20	Northwestern State
2	Zjori Bosha	10	2016–17	Austin College
3	Zjori Bosha	9	2016–17	Arlington Baptist
4	Zjori Bosha	8	2017–18	St. Thomas (TX)
	Tyran de Lattibeaudiere	8	2014–15	Texas State
	Atiim Browne	8	1991–92	Sam Houston State
	Greg Anderson	8	1985–86	UT Arlington
8	Zjori Bosha	7	2017–18	Howard Payne
	Skyler Williams	7	2008–09	Louisiana College
	Lamar Sanders	7	2007–08	Louisiana College
	Terry Johnson	7	1994–95	South Alabama
	Quincy Dockins	7	1993–94	Louisiana Tech
	Shawn Copes	7	1991–92	Sam Houston State
	Ike Mills	7	1974–75	Houston Baptist

== Blocks ==
Career
Rank	Player	Blocks	Seasons
1	Jason Grant	196	2002–03 2003–04 2004–05 2005–06
2	B.B. Davis	170	1977–78 1978–79 1979–80 1980–81
3	Kenneth Perkins	133	1980–81 1981–82 1982–83 1983–84
4	David Muoka	132	2019–20 2020–21
5	Andrew Holifield	108	2024–25 2025–26
6	Thomas Fairley	105	2004–05 2005–06
7	Adam Hamilton	94	2022–23 2023–24 2024–25
8	Coy Custer	93	2007–08 2008–09 2009–10 2010–11
9	Osas Ebomwonyi	85	2010–11 2011–12 2012–13
	Marlone Jackson	85	1996–97 1997–98 1998–99 1999–00

Season
Rank	Player	Blocks	Season
1	B.B. Davis	75	1979–80
2	David Muoka	74	2020–21
3	Jason Grant	71	2003–04
4	Thomas Fairley	70	2005–06
5	Jay Brown	66	2008–09
6	Tyran de Lattibeaudiere	63	2014–15
	Osas Ebomwonyi	63	2011–12
8	David Muoka	58	2019–20
9	Andrew Holifield	54	2024–25
	Andrew Holifield	54	2025–26

Single game
Rank	Player	Blocks	Season	Opponent
1	David Muoka	9	2020–21	Stephen F. Austin
	B.B. Davis	9	1979–80	UT Arlington
