= 1979–80 Lamar Cardinals basketball team =

American college basketball season

1979–80 Lamar Cardinals basketball

Southland Conference champions

NCAA Tournament, Sweet Sixteen
- Conference: Southland Conference
- Record: 22–11 (8–2 Southland)
- Head coach: Billy Tubbs (4th season)
- Home arena: McDonald Gym

For information on all Lamar University sports, see Lamar Cardinals and Lady Cardinals

1979–80 Southland Conference men's basketball standings
	Conf.				Overall
Team	W		L	PCT	W		L	PCT
Lamar	8	–	2	.800	22	–	11	.667
Southwestern Louisiana	5	–	5	.500	21	–	9	.700
Arkansas State	5	–	5	.500	15	–	12	.556
McNeese State	5	–	5	.500	15	–	12	.556
Louisiana Tech	4	–	6	.400	17	–	10	.630
Texas-Arlington	3	–	7	.300	14	–	13	.519
Rankings from AP Poll

The 1979–80 Lamar Cardinals basketball team represented Lamar University during the 1979–80 NCAA Division I men's basketball season. The Cardinals were led by fourth-year head coach Billy Tubbs and played their home games at McDonald Gym in Beaumont, Texas as members of the Southland Conference. The Cardinals won the regular season conference championship to receive an invitation to the 1980 NCAA Division I men's basketball tournament where they defeated No. 7 seed Weber State in the first round and No. 2 seed Oregon State in the second round to reach the Sweet Sixteen for the first and only time in program history. Lamar fell to Clemson to finish the season with a record of 22–11 (8–2 Southland).

== Roster ==
1979–80 Lamar Cardinals men's basketball team
Players
Coaches

Pos.	#	Name	Height	Weight	Year	Hometown
F		Clarence Kea	6 ft 6 in (1.98 m)	210 lb (95 kg)	Sr	Wilmington, NC
G		Mike Olliver	6 ft 1 in (1.85 m)	—	Jr	Dudley, NC
C		B. B. Davis	6 ft 8 in (2.03 m)	—	Jr	Beaumont, TX
F		Cestrakiah Lewis	6 ft 4 in (1.93 m)	—	Sr
G		Alvin Brooks	5 ft 10 in (1.78 m)	—	Jr	Houston, TX
G		Robert Williams	6 ft 6 in (1.98 m)	—	Sr
C		Mike Rutter	6 ft 8 in (2.03 m)	—	Sr
F		Arthur Gray	6 ft 4 in (1.93 m)	—	So
G		Calvin Kane	6 ft 0 in (1.83 m)	—	So
C		Glen Marks	6 ft 8 in (2.03 m)	—	So

Head coach

- Billy Tubbs (Lamar)

Assistant coach(es)

Legend

- (C) Team captain
- (S) Suspended
- (I) Ineligible
- (W) Walk-on
- Injured
- Current redshirt

Roster

== Schedule and results ==
Date time, TV	Rank^{#}	Opponent^{#}	Result	Record	Site (attendance) city, state
Non-conference regular season
Nov 30, 1979*		vs. Long Beach State; Great Alaska Shootout	L 85–98	0–1	Buckner Fieldhouse (3,000); Fort Richardson, Alaska
Dec 1, 1979*		vs. Texas A&M; Great Alaska Shootout	W 61–60	1–1	Buckner Fieldhouse (3,200); Fort Richardson, Alaska
Dec 2, 1979*		vs. Bradley; Great Alaska Shootout	L 75–82	1–2	Buckner Fieldhouse (1,200); Fort Richardson, Alaska
Dec 2, 1979*		Texas Southern	W 98–88 ^{OT}	2–2	McDonald Gym (4,200); Beaumont, Texas
Dec 8, 1979*		West Georgia	W 98–88	3–2	McDonald Gym (4,200); Beaumont, Texas
Dec 11, 1979*		at Texas–Pan American	L 65–70	3–3	Pan American Fieldhouse (4,500); Edinburg, Texas
Dec 13, 1979*		at Texas Tech	L 68–83	3–4	Lubbock Municipal Coliseum (4,332); Lubbock, Texas
Dec 15, 1979*		Northwest Missouri State	W 64–61	4–4	McDonald Gym (2,000); Beaumont, Texas
Dec 18, 1979*		Texas A&I	W 94–81	5–4	McDonald Gym (2,600); Beaumont, Texas
Dec 21, 1979*		vs. Northern Illinois; Holiday Festival	W 83–81	6–4	Horton Fieldhouse (2,013); Normal, Illinois
Dec 22, 1979*		at Northern Illinois; Holiday Festival	L 64–96	6–5	Horton Fieldhouse (3,117); Normal, Illinois
Dec 29, 1979*		at Arizona	L 57–61	6–6	McKale Center (10,590); Tucson, Arizona
Jan 3, 1980*		Oklahoma City	W 102–82	7–6	McDonald Gym (3,500); Beaumont, Texas
Jan 5, 1980*		at No. 12 Missouri	L 60–71	7–7	Hearnes Center (9,407); Columbia, Missouri
Jan 7, 1980*		Wisconsin–Parkside	W 63–45	8–7	McDonald Gym (3,330); Beaumont, Texas
Jan 9, 1980*		South Carolina State	W 63–45	9–7	McDonald Gym (4,200); Beaumont, Texas
Jan 12, 1980*		at Portland State	W 141–84	10–7	Viking Pavilion (1,600); Portland, Oregon
Jan 15, 1980*		at No. 1 DePaul	L 61–63	10–8	Alumni Hall (5,444); Chicago, Illinois
Jan 19, 1980*		Texas–Pan American	W 86–79	11–8	McDonald Gym (4,800); Beaumont, Texas
Jan 21, 1980*		Portland State	W 99–78	12–8	McDonald Gym (4,200); Beaumont, Texas
Southland Conference regular season
Jan 26, 1980		Louisiana Tech	W 70–64	13–8 (1–0)	McDonald Gym (5,000); Beaumont, Texas
Jan 28, 1980		at Arkansas State	W 52–48	14–8 (2–0)	Indian Fieldhouse (4,448); Jonesboro, Arkansas
Feb 2, 1980		Texas–Arlington	W 118–81	15–8 (3–0)	McDonald Gym (5,000); Beaumont, Texas
Feb 4, 1980		Texas–Arlington	W 118–81	16–8 (4–0)	McDonald Gym (5,000); Beaumont, Texas
Feb 4, 1980		at Southwestern Louisiana	L 64–75	16–9 (4–1)	Blackham Coliseum (6,261); Lafayette, Louisiana
Feb 9, 1980		at Louisiana Tech	W 85–75	17–9 (5–1)	Memorial Gymnasium (1,797); Ruston, Louisiana
Feb 11, 1980		McNeese	W 105–82	18–9 (6–1)	McDonald Gym (5,000); Beaumont, Texas
Feb 16, 1980		Arkansas State	W 80–53	19–9 (7–1)	McDonald Gym (5,000); Beaumont, Texas
Feb 18, 1980		at Texas–Arlington	W 99–82	20–9 (8–1)	Texas Hall (1,449); Arlington, Texas
Feb 23, 1980		Southwestern Louisiana	W 90–87	21–9 (8–1)	McDonald Gym (5,000); Beaumont, Texas
Feb 25, 1980		at McNeese	L 85–95	20–10 (8–2)	Lake Charles Civic Center (5,500); Lake Charles, Louisiana
NCAA Division I men's basketball tournament
Mar 6, 1980*	(10 W)	vs. (7 W) No. 17 Weber State; First round	W 87–86	21–10	Dee Events Center (11,505); Ogden, Utah
Mar 8, 1980*	(10 W)	vs. (2 W) No. 5 Oregon State; Second round	W 81–77	22–10	Dee Events Center (11,551); Ogden, Utah
Mar 13, 1980*	(10 W)	vs. (6 W) Clemson; West Regional Semifinal – Sweet Sixteen	L 66–74	22–11	McKale Center (7,729); Tucson, Arizona
*Non-conference game. ^{#}Rankings from AP Poll. (#) Tournament seedings in parentheses. W=West. All times are in Central Time.
