= 1978–79 Lamar Cardinals basketball team =

American college basketball season

1978–79 Lamar Cardinals basketball

Southland Conference champions

NCAA Tournament, Second round
- Conference: Southland Conference
- Record: 23–9 (9–1 Southland)
- Head coach: Billy Tubbs (3rd season)
- Home arena: McDonald Gym; Beaumont Civic Center

1978–79 Southland Conference men's basketball standings
	Conf.				Overall
Team	W		L	PCT	W		L	PCT
Lamar	9	–	1	.900	23	–	9	.719
Louisiana Tech	6	–	4	.600	17	–	8	.680
Southwestern Louisiana	6	–	4	.600	16	–	11	.593
Arkansas State	5	–	5	.500	15	–	12	.556
McNeese State	3	–	7	.300	10	–	17	.370
Texas-Arlington	1	–	9	.100	11	–	16	.407
Rankings from AP poll

The 1978–79 Lamar Cardinals basketball team represented Lamar University during the 1978–79 NCAA Division I men's basketball season. The Cardinals were led by third-year head coach Billy Tubbs and played their home games at McDonald Gym in Beaumont, Texas as members of the Southland Conference. The Cardinals won the regular season conference championship to receive an invitation to the 1979 NCAA Division I men's basketball tournament where they defeated No. 7 seed Detroit in the first round before falling to No. 1 seed and eventual National champion Michigan State and Magic Johnson. Lamar finished the season with a record of 23–9 (9–1 Southland). This season was the first of three straight (and four in five years) NCAA Tournament appearances for the Cardinals.

== Roster ==
1978–79 Lamar Cardinals men's basketball team
Players
Coaches

Pos.	#	Name	Height	Weight	Year	Hometown
G		Mike Olliver	6 ft 0 in (1.83 m)	—	So	Dudley, NC
C		B. B. Davis	6 ft 8 in (2.03 m)	—	So	Beaumont, TX
F		Clarence Kea	6 ft 6 in (1.98 m)	210 lb (95 kg)	Jr	Wilmington, NC
C		Cestrakiah Lewis	6 ft 6 in (1.98 m)	—	Jr
G		Norman Bellard	6 ft 1 in (1.85 m)	—	Sr	Beaumont, TX
F		Robert Williams	6 ft 6 in (1.98 m)	—	Jr
F		Larry Stephenson	6 ft 9 in (2.06 m)	—	So
C		Mike Rutter	6 ft 8 in (2.03 m)	—	Jr
G		Chris Jones	6 ft 5 in (1.96 m)	—	Sr
G		Eric Gathers	6 ft 0 in (1.83 m)	—	Fr
F		Arthur Gray	6 ft 4 in (1.93 m)	—	Fr

Head coach

- Billy Tubbs (Lamar)

Assistant coach(es)

Legend

- (C) Team captain
- (S) Suspended
- (I) Ineligible
- (W) Walk-on
- Injured
- Current redshirt

Roster
Last update: November 7, 2023

== Schedule and results ==
Date time, TV	Rank^{#}	Opponent^{#}	Result	Record	Site (attendance) city, state
Non-conference regular season
Nov 24, 1978*		at Alaska-Anchorage; Great Alaska Shootout	W 88–66	1–0	Buckner Fieldhouse (3,600); Anchorage, Alaska
Nov 25, 1978*		vs. No. 4 Louisville; Great Alaska Shootout	L 68–90	1–1	Buckner Fieldhouse (3,800); Anchorage, Alaska
Nov 26, 1978*		vs. Pepperdine; Great Alaska Shootout	L 74–75	1–2	Buckner Fieldhouse (3,800); Anchorage, Alaska
Nov 29, 1978*		Texas Southern	W 84–72	2–2	Beaumont Civic Center (4,900); Beaumont, Texas
Dec 2, 1978*		Stephen F. Austin	W 85–63	3–2	Beaumont Civic Center (4,600); Beaumont, Texas
Dec 5, 1978*		at New Mexico	L 84–97	3–3	University Arena (14,805); Albuquerque, New Mexico
Dec 9, 1978*		Southwestern	W 82–68	4–3	McDonald Gym (3,200); Beaumont, Texas
Dec 11, 1978*		Texas Lutheran	W 112–74	5–3	McDonald Gym (2,000); Beaumont, Texas
Dec 13, 1978*		Oklahoma Arts and Sciences	W 92–55	6–3	McDonald Gym (2,800); Beaumont, Texas
Dec 16, 1978*		at North Texas	L 89–95	6–4	Super Pit (2,300); Denton, Texas
Dec 18, 1978*		at Northeast Louisiana	W 75–74 ^{OT}	7–4	Fant–Ewing Coliseum (4,300); Monroe, Louisiana
Dec 23, 1978*		at Pan American	W 74–72	8–4	UTPA Fieldhouse (2,900); Edinburg, Texas
Dec 30, 1978*		at Colorado State	L 62–72	8–5	Moby Arena (3,522); Fort Collins, Colorado
Jan 6, 1979*		University of Wisconsin–Parkside	W 102–79	9–5	McDonald Gym (2,700); Beaumont, Texas
Jan 8, 1979*		Pan American	W 91–85	10–5	McDonald Gym (3,300); Beaumont, Texas
Jan 13, 1979*		North Texas	W 122–91	11–5	Beaumont Civic Center (5,000); Beaumont, Texas
Jan 15, 1979*		Hardin–Simmons	W 105–84	12–5	McDonald Gym (3,800); Beaumont, Texas
Jan 18, 1979*		at Oral Roberts	L 71–80	12–6	Mabee Center (6,152); Tulsa, Oklahoma
Jan 20, 1979*		at OCU	L 86–99	12–7	Frederickson Fieldhouse (2,614); Oklahoma City, Oklahoma
Southland Conference regular season
Jan 22, 1979		Louisiana Tech	W 90–87	13–7 (1–0)	Beaumont Civic Center (4,700); Beaumont, Texas
Jan 27, 1979		Arkansas State	W 90–87	14–7 (2–0)	Beaumont Civic Center (4,700); Beaumont, Texas
Jan 29, 1979		at Louisiana Tech	W 76–75	15–7 (3–0)	Memorial Gymnasium (1,526); Ruston, Louisiana
Feb 3, 1979		Southwestern Louisiana	W 92–73	16–7 (4–0)	Beaumont Civic Center (5,000); Beaumont, Texas
Feb 10, 1979		UT Arlington	W 113–98	17–7 (5–0)	Beaumont Civic Center (5,000); Beaumont, Texas
Feb 14, 1979		at McNeese	W 95–79	18–7 (6–0)	Lake Charles Civic Center (4,879); Lake Charles, Louisiana
Feb 17, 1979		at USL	L 84–88	18–8 (6–1)	Blackham Coliseum (9,216); Lafayette, Louisiana
Feb 19, 1979		McNeese	W 103–83	19–8 (7–1)	Beaumont Civic Center (4,600); Beaumont, Texas
Feb 24, 1979		at UT Arlington	W 103–83	20–8 (8–1)	Texas Hall (1,249); Arlington, Texas
Non-conference regular season
Feb 26, 1979*		at Hardin–Simmons	W 113–84	21–8 (8–1)	Mabee Athletic Complex (100); Abilene, Texas
Southland Conference regular season
Mar 1, 1979		Arkansas State	W 90–87	22–8 (9–1)	Beaumont Civic Center (5,000); Beaumont, Texas
NCAA Division I men's basketball tournament
Mar 9, 1979*	(10 ME)	vs. (7 ME) No. 17 Detroit; First round	W 95–87	23–8	Murphy Center (10,892); Murfreesboro, Tennessee
Mar 10, 1979*	(10 ME)	vs. (2 ME) No. 4 Michigan State; Second round	L 64–95	23–9	Murphy Center (10,892); Murfreesboro, Tennessee
*Non-conference game. ^{#}Rankings from AP Poll. (#) Tournament seedings in parentheses. ME=Mideast. All times are in Central Time.
