= 1980–81 Lamar Cardinals basketball team =

American college basketball season

1980–81 Lamar Cardinals basketball

Southland Conference

1981 NCAA Division I men's basketball tournament, Round of 32
- Conference: Southland Conference
- Record: 25–5 (8–2 Southland)
- Head coach: Pat Foster (1st season)
- Home arena: McDonald Gym (6 home games); Beaumont Civic Center (8 home games)

1980–81 Southland Conference men's basketball standings
	Conf.				Overall
Team	W		L	PCT	W		L	PCT
Lamar †	8	–	2	.800	25	–	5	.833
Texas-Arlington	7	–	3	.700	20	–	8	.714
Louisiana Tech	7	–	3	.700	20	–	10	.667
Southwestern Louisiana	6	–	4	.600	15	–	13	.536
Arkansas State	2	–	8	.200	12	–	15	.444
McNeese State	0	–	10	.000	11	–	21	.344
† Southland Tournament winner Rankings from AP poll

The 1980–81 Lamar Cardinals basketball team represented Lamar University during the 1980–81 NCAA Division I men's basketball season. The Cardinals were led by first-year head coach Pat Foster split the home schedule with six home games at McDonald Gym with eight games at the Beaumont Civic Center in Beaumont, Texas as members of the Southland Conference. The Cardinals won the regular season conference championship and the 1981 Southland Conference men's basketball tournament. They received an automatic invitation to the 1981 NCAA Division I men's basketball tournament where they defeated the Missouri Tigers in the first game and lost to LSU in the second game. Lamar finished the season with a record of 25–5. The Cardinals were ranked in the AP Poll for one week at number 19.

== Roster ==
1980–81 Lamar Cardinals men's basketball team
Players
Coaches

Pos.	#	Name	Height	Weight	Year	Hometown
G		Mike Olliver	6 ft 1 in (1.85 m)	—	Sr	Dudley, North Carolina
C		B. B. Davis	6 ft 8 in (2.03 m)	—	Sr	Beaumont, Texas
G		Alvin Brooks	5 ft 10 in (1.78 m)	—	Sr	Houston, Texas
G		Terry Long	6 ft 3 in (1.91 m)	—	Jr
F		Kenneth Perkins	6 ft 6 in (1.98 m)	—	Fr	Beaumont, TX
F		Mike Wallace	6 ft 5 in (1.96 m)	—	Jr
F		Arthur Gray	6 ft 4 in (1.93 m)	—	Jr
C		Larry Stephenson	6 ft 9 in (2.06 m)	—	Jr
G		Ronnie Claiborne	5 ft 8 in (1.73 m)	—	Fr
G		Paul Marks	6 ft 2 in (1.88 m)	—	Fr
G		Nicky Snell	6 ft 2 in (1.88 m)	—	Jr
		Darrell Jones	—	—	Fr

Head coach

- Pat Foster (Arkansas)

Assistant coach(es)

Legend

- (C) Team captain
- (S) Suspended
- (I) Ineligible
- (W) Walk-on
- Injured
- Current redshirt

Roster
Last update: February 8, 2010

== Schedule and results ==
Date time, TV	Rank^{#}	Opponent^{#}	Result	Record	Site (attendance) city, state
Non-conference regular season
December 1, 1980*		Stephen F. Austin	W 81–67	1–0	McDonald Gym (3,400); Beaumont, TX
December 3, 1980*		Augsburg College	W 101–60	2–0	McDonald Gym (3,300); Beaumont, TX
December 5, 1980*		vs. Pittsburgh; Showme Classic	W 67–65	3–0	Hearnes Center (9,993); Columbia, MO
December 6, 1980*		at No. 17 Missouri; Showme Classic	L 70–92	3–1	Hearnes Center (10,048); Columbia, MO
December 10, 1980*		Texas Southern	W 88–73	4–1	McDonald Gym (3,450); Beaumont, TX
December 13, 1980*		Texas A&I	W 75–50	5–1	McDonald Gym (3,100); Beaumont, TX
December 17, 1980*		at Oklahoma	W 80–79	6–1	Lloyd Noble Center (4,593); Norman, OK
December 26, 1980*		vs. Grambling State; Copper State Classic	W 88–82	7–1	McKale Center (8,308); Tucson, AZ
December 27, 1980*		at Arizona; Copper State Classic	W 63–61	8–1	McKale Center (8,675); Tucson, AZ
January 2, 1981*		at Stephen F. Austin	W 64–62	9–1	William R. Johnson Coliseum (1,750); Nacogdoches, TX
January 7, 1981*		Prairie View A&M	W 102–61	10–1	Beaumont Civic Center (4,441); Beaumont, TX
January 15, 1981*		Pan American	W 104–80	11–1	McDonald Gym (3,559); Beaumont, TX
January 17, 1981*		at Houston	L 64–70	11–2	Hofheinz Pavilion (10,100); Houston, TX
January 19, 1981*		Southern	W 85–67	12–2	McDonald Gym (3,319); Beaumont, TX
January 21, 1981*		Texas Lutheran	W 121–71	13–2	Beaumont Civic Center (4,220); Beaumont, TX
January 24, 1981*		at Pan American	W 78–70	14–2	Pan American Fieldhouse (5,649); Edinburg, TX
Southland Conference regular season
January 26, 1981		Louisiana Tech	W 66–64	15–2 (1–0)	Beaumont Civic Center (4,953); Beaumont, TX
January 31, 1981		Texas–Arlington	W 89–84 ^{OT}	16–2 (2–0)	Texas Hall (4,316); Arlington, TX
February 2, 1981*		at Arkansas State	W 62–51	17–2 (3–0)	Indian Fieldhouse (4,521); Jonesboro, AR
February 7, 1981		Southwestern Louisiana	W 87–74	18–2 (4–0)	Beaumont Civic Center (5,831); Beaumont, TX
February 9, 1981		at McNeese State	W 90–87 ^{OT}	19–2 (5–0)	Lake Charles Civic Center (5,327); Lake Charles, LA
February 12, 1981		Texas–Arlington	W 79–75	20–2 (6–0)	Beaumont Civic Center (5,772); Beaumont, TX
February 16, 1981	No. 19	at Louisiana Tech	L 71–77	20–3 (6–1)	Memorial Gym (2,653); Ruston, LA
February 21, 1981	No. 19	Arkansas State	W 89–69	21–3 (7–1)	Beaumont Civic Center (5,232); Beaumont, TX
February 23, 1981		at Southwestern Louisiana	L 81–97	21–4 (7–2)	Blackham Coliseum (7,956); Lafayette, LA
February 28, 1981		McNeese State	W 87–76	22–4 (8–2)	Beaumont Civic Center (5,711); Beaumont, TX
Southland tournament
March 4, 1981	(1)	(4) Southwestern Louisiana; Semifinal	W 83–68	23–4	Beaumont Civic Center (4,905); Beaumont, TX
March 5, 1981	(1)	(2) Louisiana Tech; Championship	W 83–69	24–4	Beaumont Civic Center (5,052); Beaumont, TX
NCAA Division I men's basketball tournament
March 12, 1981	(8 MW)	vs. (9 MW) Missouri; Round of 48	W 71–67	25–4	Frank Erwin Center (6,475); Austin, TX
March 14, 1981	(8 MW)	vs. (1 MW) LSU; Round of 32	L 78–100	25–5	Frank Erwin Center (8,523); Austin, TX
*Non-conference game. ^{#}Rankings from AP Poll. (#) Tournament seedings in parentheses. MW=Midwest. All times are in Central Time.
