= List of Lamar Cardinals head basketball coaches =

The following is a list of Lamar Cardinals basketball head coaches. There have been 12 head coaches of the Cardinals in their 72-season history.

Lamar's current head coach is Alvin Brooks. He was hired as the Cardinals' head coach in April 2021, replacing Tic Price, who was fired after the 2020–21 season.

| No. | Tenure | Coach | Years | Record | Pct. |
|---|---|---|---|---|---|
| 1 | 1951–1976 | Jack Martin | 25 | 334–283 | .541 |
| 2 | 1976–1980; 2003–2006 | Billy Tubbs | 7 | 121–89 | .576 |
| 3 | 1980–1986 | Pat Foster | 6 | 134–49 | .732 |
| 4 | 1986–1988 | Tom Abatemarco | 2 | 34–26 | .567 |
| 5 | 1988–1990 | Tony Branch | 2 | 19–37 | .339 |
| 6 | 1990–1993 | Mike Newell | 3 | 42–44 | .488 |
| 7 | 1993–1999 | Grey Giovanine | 6 | 80–85 | .485 |
| 8 | 1999–2003 | Mike Deane | 4 | 53–63 | .457 |
| 9 | 2006–2011 | Steve Roccaforte | 5 | 76–78 | .494 |
| 10 | 2011–2014 (Note: Knight was fired in February 2014. Tic Price was named interim head coach for the remainder of the 2013–14 season.) | Pat Knight | 3 | 29–62 | .319 |
| 11 | 2014–2021 (Note: After serving as interim head coach for the end of the 2013–14 season, Price was named permanent head coach in March 2014.) | Tic Price | 8 | 112–113 | .498 |
| 12 | 2021–present | Alvin Brooks | 2 | 11–49 | .183 |
| Totals | | 12 coaches | 72 seasons | 1,044–977 | .517 |
Records updated through end of 2022–23 season Source
