= 1981 Southland Conference men's basketball tournament =

- Classification: Division I
- Season: 1980–81
- Teams: 6
- First round site: Campus Sites; Campus Arenas
- Finals site: Beaumont Civic Center; Beaumont, TX
- Champions: Lamar (1st title)
- Winning coach: Pat Foster (1st title)
- MVP: Mike Olliver (Lamar)

1980–81 Southland Conference men's basketball standings
	Conf.				Overall
Team	W		L	PCT	W		L	PCT
Lamar †	8	–	2	.800	25	–	5	.833
Texas-Arlington	7	–	3	.700	20	–	8	.714
Louisiana Tech	7	–	3	.700	20	–	10	.667
Southwestern Louisiana	6	–	4	.600	15	–	13	.536
Arkansas State	2	–	8	.200	12	–	15	.444
McNeese State	0	–	10	.000	11	–	21	.344
† Southland Tournament winner Rankings from AP poll

The 1981 Southland Conference men's basketball tournament was held from March 3 to March 5 at a combination of on-campus gymnasiums and the Beaumont Civic Center in Beaumont, Texas. This was the first edition of the tournament.

Lamar defeated Louisiana Tech in the championship game, 83–69, to win their first Southland men's basketball tournament.

The Cardinals, in turn, received a bid to the 1981 NCAA Tournament. They were the only Southland member invited to the NCAA tournament. Regular season runner-up Texas–Arlington received an invitation to the 1981 NIT Tournament.

== Format ==
All six of the conference's members participated in the tournament field. They were seeded based on regular season conference records, with the top two teams earning byes into the semifinal round. The other four teams entered into the preliminary first round. A third-place game was held on the last day.

First Round games were played at the home court of the higher-seeded team. All remaining games were played at the Beaumont Civic Center in Beaumont, Texas, the home court of regular season champion Lamar.

== Bracket ==
First round Tuesday, March 3
5	Arkansas State	73
4	SW Louisiana	91
3	Texas–Arlington	74
6	McNeese State	79

Semifinals; Wednesday, March 4
1	Lamar	83
4	SW Louisiana	68
6	McNeese State	52
2	Louisiana Tech	64

Championship; Thursday, March 5
1	Lamar	83
2	Louisiana Tech	69
Third Place; Thursday, March 5
4	SW Louisiana	79
6	McNeese State	73
