= Southern Wayne High School =

American public school in North Carolina

Location
- 124 Southern Wayne Drive; Dudley, North Carolina 28333; United States; 35°24′57″N 78°04′31″W

Information
- School type: Public
- Established: 1965 (61 years ago)
- CEEB code: 341023
- Principal: Kelly Carter
- Teaching staff: 71.10 (FTE)
- Grades: 9–12
- Enrollment: 1,070 (2018–19)
- Student to teacher ratio: 15.05
- Education system: Wayne County Public Schools
- Colors: Red and blue
- Mascot: Saint
- Website: www.waynecountyschools.org/o/southernwaynehigh

Southern Wayne High School is a high school for grades 9–12, located in Dudley near Goldsboro, North Carolina, USA.

It is part of the Wayne County School System. Southern Wayne currently employs 135 staff members for over 1,000 students.

== Notable alumni ==
- Allen Battle, former MLB player
- Anthony J. Cotton, United States Air Force Four-star general and Commander of the United States Strategic Command
- Cecil Exum, former pro basketball player and 1982 NCAA basketball champion with the North Carolina Tarheels
- Leora "Sam" Jones, member of three U.S. Olympic women's handball teams (1984, 1988, and 1992)
- Charles Kornegay, former professional basketball player
- Mike Olliver, professional basketball player
- Tim Pratt, author and editor
- Greg Warren, former NFL longsnapper and 2x Super Bowl champion with the Pittsburgh Steelers
