= Greg Warren (American football) =

American football player (born 1981)

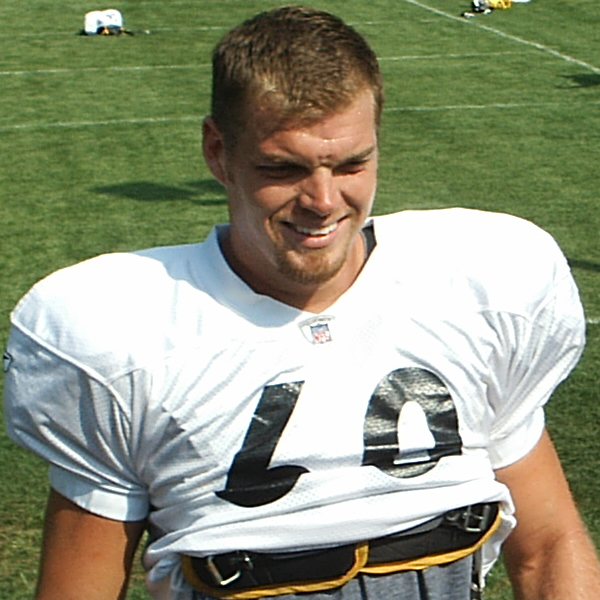
- Warren with the Pittsburgh Steelers in 2007

No. 60
- Position: Long snapper

Personal information
- Born: October 18, 1981 (age 45); Mount Olive, North Carolina, U.S.
- Listed height: 6 ft 3 in (1.91 m)
- Listed weight: 252 lb (114 kg)

Career information
- High school: Southern Wayne (Dudley, North Carolina)
- College: North Carolina (2000–2004)
- NFL draft: 2005: undrafted

Career history
- Pittsburgh Steelers (2005–2016)

Awards and highlights
- 2× Super Bowl champion (XL, XLIII)

Career NFL statistics
- Games played: 181
- Total tackles: 21
- Fumble recoveries: 1
- Stats at Pro Football Reference

Gregory Robert Warren (born October 18, 1981) is an American former professional football player who was a long snapper for the Pittsburgh Steelers of the National Football League (NFL). He played college football for the North Carolina Tar Heels and was signed by the Steelers as an undrafted free agent in after the 2005 NFL draft.

Warren earned two Super Bowl rings with the Steelers in Super Bowl XL and Super Bowl XLIII.

== Early and personal life ==
Greg Warren attended Southern Wayne High School in Dudley, North Carolina. He was a four-year letterman in football, a three-year letterman in track & field, and a member of the National Honor Society. In football, he won All-Conference Honorable Mention honors as a senior; starting for two years at center and deep snapper. In track & field, he was a three-time All-Conference Honorable Mention honoree. Warren is married to his wife Ashley Keesee Warren.

== College career ==
Warren attended the University of North Carolina, where he started his college football career as a walk-on long snapper in 2000. Warren earned the starting position in 2001, and continued as the starting long snapper for the team until his graduation after the 2004 season. While playing football at UNC, Warren: won the Peach Bowl as a freshman, was awarded a scholarship in 2003, and played in 49 consecutive games for the Tar Heels. Warren still holds the squat (500 lbs.), power clean (364 lbs.), and bench press (360 lbs.) records for specialists. Senior year, Warren served as team captain, and won the Athletic Director's Scholar-Athlete Award.

Academically, Warren double majored in biology, and exercise & sports science. Prior to his NFL career, Warren had been pursuing a career in education, as evidenced by his tenure as a teaching assistant at East Chapel Hill High School.

== Professional career ==
During his rookie season in 2005, Warren was used entirely as a long snapper, beating former Steelers center Mike Schneck for the job.

A restricted free agent in the 2008 offseason, Warren signed a three-year, $2.3 million contract with the Steelers on March 25.

Warren sustained a season ending knee injury in a game against the New York Giants on October 25, 2008. The importance of a competent long snapper became evident after Warren left the game: the substitute long snapper, James Harrison, sent a snap sailing over the punter's head and out the back of the end zone resulting in a safety. This tied the score and gave the Giants good field position on the ensuing kick resulting in the go ahead touchdown late in the game. He was placed on injured reserve later that week.

On December 21, 2009, Warren was placed on injured reserve with a torn anterior cruciate ligament (ACL), officially ending his 2009 season in week 14.

On October 23, 2016, Warren had his first career fumble recovery against the New England Patriots after Julian Edelman fumbled the ball while returning a punt by Jordan Berry.

On February 2, 2017, Warren re-signed with the Steelers on a one-year contract.

On May 18, 2017, Warren was released by the Steelers after 12 seasons due to a failed physical.
