= Terry Johnson (basketball) =

American basketball coach

Current position
- Title: Associate Head Coach
- Team: Evansville
- Conference: Missouri Valley Conference

Biographical details
- Born: Philippi, West Virginia

Playing career
- 1992–1994: Lincoln Trail CC
- 1994–1996: Lamar
- 1996–1997: Fort Wayne

Coaching career (HC unless noted)
- 1997–1999: Fort Wayne (assistant)
- 1999–2001: Indiana Tech (assistant)
- 2001–2003: Lincoln Trail CC (assistant)
- 2006–2007: Fort Wayne (assistant)
- 2007–2017: Butler (assistant)
- 2017–2021: Ohio State (assistant)
- 2021–2026: Purdue (assistant)
- 2026-present: Evansville (associate Head Coach)

Administrative career (AD unless noted)
- 2003–2004: Auburn (administrative position)
- 2004–2006: Butler (DBO)

Terry Johnson is an American basketball coach and former player. He currently is an assistant coach for the Evansville Purple Aces. He played college basketball at two schools, Lincoln Trail College and Lamar. He has previously been an assistant coach at Fort Wayne, Indiana Tech, Lincoln Trail College, Butler, Ohio State, and Purdue.

== Playing career ==
Johnson was a three-sport athlete at Anderson High School (IN), and a two-sport athlete in college. He played baseball and basketball in college, starting at Lincoln Trail College. He transferred to Lamar Cardinals men's basketball playing the two sports again. In a rare occurrence, Johnson transferred a second time, this time to Indiana University-Purdue University Fort Wayne. In 1997, playing baseball, he was named All-Conference, team MVP, and co-Male Athlete of the year. He earned his bachelor's degree from Indiana University-Purdue University Fort Wayne in 1998. He earned his master's degree in sports administration from Western Kentucky in 2011.

== Coaching career ==
He started his coaching career at his alma mater immediately after graduating, at Fort Wayne. In 1999, he left for an assistant coaching job at Indiana Tech. He stayed there until 2001, when took a job at the first college he played for, Lincoln Trail College.

After being with one school in the NCAA, and two schools outside the NCAA in six years, he switched to being an administrator. He first was an administrator at Auburn from 2003 to 2004. Johnson got back into basketball in 2004 with Butler. There, he was the director of basketball operations, who is in charge of the financial and planning aspects of the program. He returned to his alma mater, which had joined Division-1 2001 after he had left, in 2006. It was his second stint as an assistant coach there.

He finally got his big break in 2007 when he was brought back to Butler under current Boston Celtics head coach Brad Stevens. He spent the next ten years there under Stevens, Brandon Miller, and Chris Holtmann. At Butler, he was the defensive coordinator, but he was involved with every aspect of the program. In his assistant coaching career at Butler, the program's record was 250–97 (.72 winning percentage).

He got his first coaching job in the Big Ten in 2017, when he left Butler with Holtmann to join the Ohio State. Ohio State has made two NCAA men's basketball tournaments with Johnson as an assistant coach.
