= Cecil Exum =

American basketball player (1962–2023)

Personal information
- Born: August 7, 1962 Goldsboro, North Carolina, U.S.
- Died: July 2, 2023 (aged 60) Los Angeles, California, U.S.
- Listed height: 6 ft 6 in (1.98 m)
- Listed weight: 205 lb (93 kg)

Career information
- High school: Southern Wayne (Dudley, North Carolina)
- College: North Carolina (1980–1984)
- NBA draft: 1984: 9th round, 194th overall pick
- Drafted by: Denver Nuggets
- Playing career: 1986–1996
- Position: Forward

Career history
- 1986–1987: Bulleen Boomers
- 1989: North Melbourne Giants
- 1990: Melbourne Tigers
- 1991: North Melbourne Giants
- 1992–1996: Geelong Supercats

Career highlights
- NBL champion (1989); All-SEABL Team (1987); NCAA champion (1982)

Career NBL statistics
- Points: 2,104 (10.7 ppg)
- Rebounds: 1,354 (6.9 rpg)
- Assists: 359 (1.8 apg)
- Stats at Basketball Reference

Cecil Maurice Exum (August 7, 1962 – July 2, 2023) was an American-Australian professional basketball player who played eight seasons in the Australian National Basketball League (NBL). He played college basketball for the North Carolina Tar Heels, who won an NCAA championship in 1982.

== Early life ==
Exum was born in Goldsboro, North Carolina, to parents Johnny and Barbara Exum. He was raised in Dudley, North Carolina, where he attended Southern Wayne High School. He led their team to the 1980 North Carolina 4A state title, and he was named the tournament's most valuable player. As of 2012, he was the only male basketball player to have his jersey retired by the school.

== College career ==
Exum played four years of college basketball for the North Carolina Tar Heels between 1980 and 1984. He was a member of the Tar Heels' 1982 NCAA championship team that included future Hall of Fame players Michael Jordan and James Worthy. In 103 career games, he averaged 1.5 points in 4.3 minutes per game.

== Professional career ==
Exum was selected by the Denver Nuggets in the ninth round of the 1984 NBA draft with the 194th overall pick. He suffered a serious knee injury just before the tryouts began and never played in the NBA.

In 1985, after a season in Sweden, Exum received an opportunity to play in Japan but instead chose Australia, preferring an English-speaking country after his stint in Sweden. He arrived in Australia in January 1986, and joined the Bulleen Boomers of the South East Australian Basketball League (SEABL). He helped the Boomers reach the playoffs in 1986. In his second season for the Boomers in 1987, he was named to the All-SEABL Team.

In 1988, Exum joined the North Melbourne Giants of the Australian National Basketball League (NBL), but was unable to play due to not being naturalized yet. He debuted for the Giants in the 1989 NBL season and won an NBL championship. He played for the Melbourne Tigers in 1990, returned to the Giants in 1991, and then played five seasons for the Geelong Supercats between 1992 and 1996. He enjoyed his best season in 1992, averaging a career-high 17.2 points, 10.5 rebounds, two assists, 2.4 steals, and 1.5 blocks per game. He became Geelong's longest serving captain. In 197 NBL games, he averaged 10.7 points, 6.9 rebounds, 1.8 assists and 1.2 steals per game.

== Personal life ==
Exum became a naturalized Australian citizen. He and his wife Desiree had three children: Jamaar (born 1993) and twins Dante and Tierra (born 1995). As of 2014, Desiree was based in Singapore working for IBM. His son Dante also became a professional basketball player.

As of 2017, Exum had been coaching junior basketball players for 27 years in Melbourne.

== Death ==
Exum died in Los Angeles on July 2, 2023, at the age of 60. He had reportedly been in intensive care with lung complications.
