= Linwood Forte =

American serial killer on death row

- Born: Linwood Earl Forte; July 25, 1964 (age 62); North Carolina, U.S.
- Other name: "The Nightstalker"
- Convictions: First degree murder (3 counts); Rape (3 counts); Burglary; Assault with deadly weapon; Discharging a firearm on property; Driving while impaired (2 counts); Drug possession; Receiving stolen property (2 counts); Unauthorized use of a vehicle (2 counts); Assault on a police officer (2 counts); Resisting arrest; Larceny
- Penalty: Death (for murders); 4 life sentences (for rapes and burglary)

Details
- Victims: 3–4
- Span of crimes: May 26 – October 6, 1990 (possibly 1994)
- Country: United States
- State: North Carolina
- Date apprehended: April 30, 2001
- Imprisoned at: Central Prison, Raleigh, North Carolina

Linwood Earl Forte (born July 25, 1964), known as The Nightstalker, is an American serial killer and rapist who murdered three people at their residences in Goldsboro, North Carolina over five months in 1990. As a result of DNA testing, he was arrested for the crimes in 2001, after which he became the prime suspect in a fourth murder committed in 1994. He was convicted of his confirmed crimes and subsequently sentenced to death, and is currently awaiting execution.

== Murders ==
On May 26, 1990, Forte's first recorded attack occurred at the home of 70-year-old Eliza Jones, whom he attempted to strangle in her bed but had to flee because her daughter arrived home. When questioned about the perpetrator, Jones stated that she could not remember and could not provide any clues. Approximately two months later, on July 14, 79-year-old Hattie Davis Bonner was found suffocated in her bed in a strikingly similar manner to the previous attack.

On October 6, Forte broke into the home of 78-year-old Alvin Bowen, a retired Southern Bell executive, and his 75-year-old wife Thelma, who was blind. Upon being discovered by Alvin, Forte stabbed the elderly man multiple times before strangling Thelma to death. In an attempt to cover up the crime scene, Forte then used a flammable liquid to set fire to the house and their car. The resulting blaze caught the attention of the neighbors, who quickly alerted the authorities, who managed to put it out before it could reach the couple's bedroom. Despite this, police struggled to gather any useful clues that could lead to the arrest of a viable suspect. A reward of $2,000 was offered by the local Crime Stoppers branch to anybody who could provide information leading to an arrest.

== Investigation and arrest ==
The sudden increase of murders in the Goldsboro area alarmed the residents, spreading rumors that a potential serial killer was active in the area. Initially, local police rejected this hypothesis, claiming that beyond some coincidences at the Bowen crime scene and the murder of a waitress at a local restaurant, there was nothing to connect any recent murders. This sentiment eventually changed, however, as investigators noticed striking similarities between the attack on Jones, the murder of Bonner and the double murder of the Bowens. Some of these similarities consisted of all the victims being elderly, the attacks occurring around midnight Friday or early Sunday, the houses next to vacant lots, and the perpetrator strangling or suffocating the female victims. Owing to the lack of clues or any suspects, all four cases eventually went cold, and were considered among the most notorious unsolved murders in the state at the time.

In 1996, Forte was convicted of firing a gun inside his home in Dudley. As a convicted felon, he was obliged to submit a DNA sample so it could be entered into CODIS. Five years later, his DNA was linked to the Nightstalker murders, resulting in his subsequent arrest on April 30, 2001, at his workplace in Dudley. While he was awaiting trial at Central Prison, detectives found evidence that supposedly linked him to the 1994 murder of 46-year-old Dora Ann Thomas, who was found raped and strangled at her apartment in Goldsboro on June 30, 1994. He was never brought to trial for this crime but is still considered the prime suspect.

== Trial and imprisonment ==
Forte was eventually brought to trial for the Nightstalker cases. Due to the overwhelming amount of evidence against him, he was swiftly convicted, receiving a death sentence for the murders and four consecutive life sentences for the rapes. Reportedly, the DNA evidence was so conclusive that his attorneys rested their case without calling forward a single witness. The sentence was met with thanks to the prosecutors from some of the victims' family members as well as tears from many of the jurors.

The following year, his appeal for an unrelated attempted prison escape and assault on a prison guard was rejected by the North Carolina Court of Appeals. As of July 2022, Forte remains on death row, awaiting execution.

== See also ==
- Capital punishment in North Carolina
- List of death row inmates in the United States § North Carolina
- List of serial killers in the United States
