= Kenny Haynes =

American basketball player

Personal information
- Listed height: 5 ft 11 in (1.80 m)

Career information
- High school: Dixon (Dixon, Illinois)
- College: Lamar (1967–1970)
- NBA draft: 1970: undrafted
- Position: Guard

Career highlights
- Southland Player of the Year (1970); Second-team All-Southland (1970)

Kenny Haynes is an American former basketball player. He played college basketball for the Lamar Cardinals as a three-year starter from 1967 to 1970 and is considered one of the team's great defensive players. Haynes led the Cardinals to the Southland Conference championship and was selected as the Southland Player of the Year in 1970. He was named to the All-Southland Second Team in 1970.

Haynes attended Dixon High School in Dixon, Illinois, and graduated in 1966.

Haynes was inducted into the Cardinal Hall of Honor in 2000.
