= University of Oklahoma College of Arts and Sciences =

College of the University of Oklahoma in Norman, Oklahoma

Coordinates: 35°12′28″N 97°26′50″W

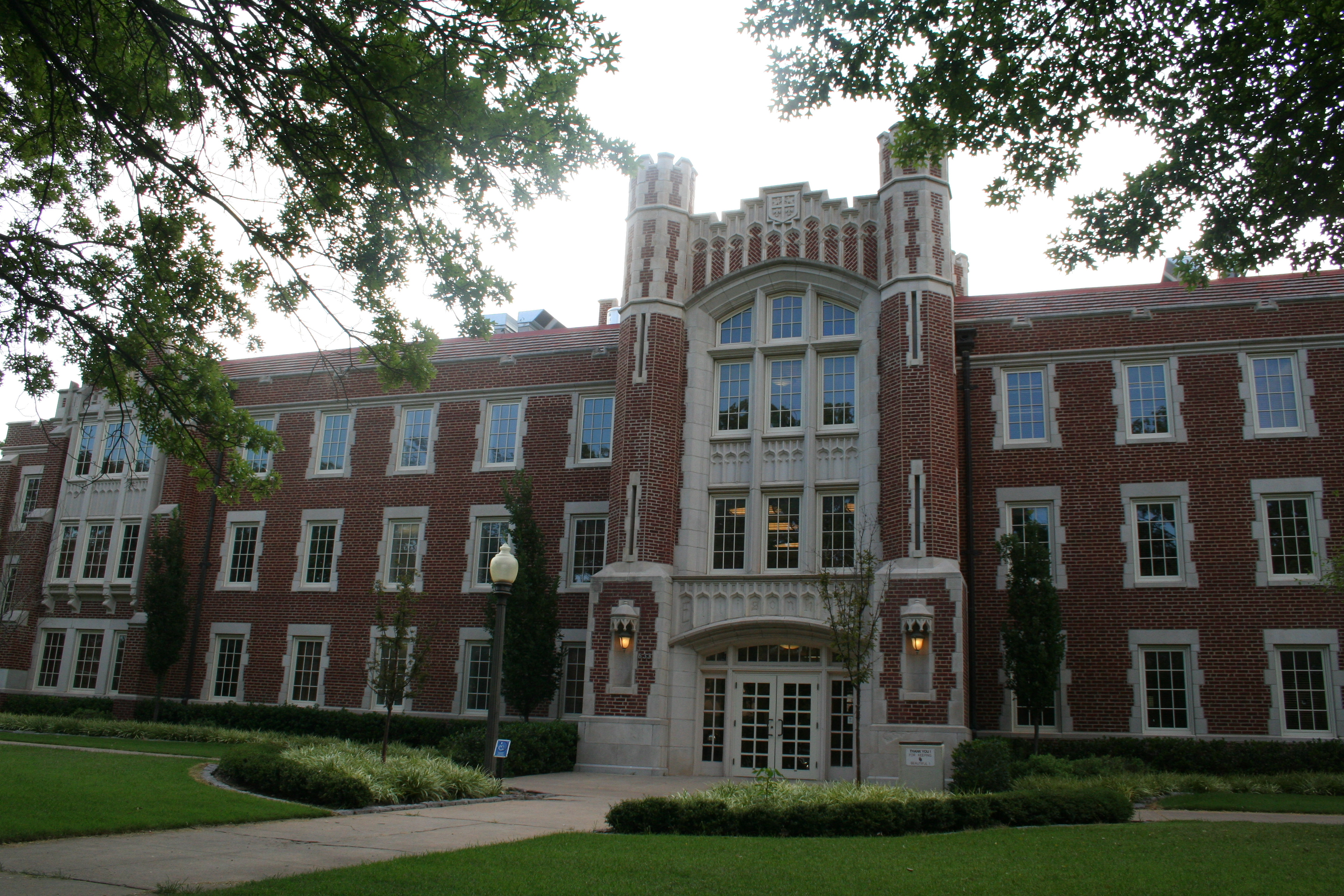
Ellison Hall, Home of the College of Arts and Sciences

The University of Oklahoma College of Arts and Sciences, also known as the College of A&S (or simply CAS) is the liberal arts and sciences unit of the University of Oklahoma in Norman, Oklahoma. Established in 1909, the college is currently the largest unit at OU in terms of the number of students enrolled. Classes are held all over campus but the main office is located in Ellison Hall on the main campus in Norman.

== Majors offered ==
OU College of Arts and Sciences offers the following undergraduate majors:

- African and African American Studies, BA
- Anthropology, BA
- Anthropology: Human, Health & Biology, BS
- Astronomy, BS
- Astrophysics, BS
- Biochemistry, BS
- Biology, BS
- Chemistry (Professional), BS
- Chemistry and Biochemistry, BS
- Chemical Biosciences, BS
- Classics, BA
- Classics: Classical Languages, BA
- Classics: Classical Studies, BA
- Classics: Latin, BA
- Communication, BA
- Community Health, BS or BA
- Economics, BA
- English: Writing, BA
- English: Library & Cultural Studies, BA
- Environmental Studies, BS or BA
- Film and Media Studies, BA
- Health and Exercise Science, BS
- History, BA
- History of Science, Technology, and Medicine, BA
- Human Relations, BA
- Information Studies, BA
- Arabic, BA
- Chinese, BA
- French, BA
- German, BA
- Italian, BA
- Japanese, BA
- Russian, BA
- Spanish, BA
- Judaic Studies, BA
- Latinx Studies, BA
- Letters, BA
- Letters: Constitutional Studies, BA
- Linguistics, BA
- Mathematics, BA
- Mathematics (Professional), BS
- Microbiology, BS
- Microbiology: Biotechnology, BS
- Microbiology (Professional), BS
- Native American Studies, BA
- Philosophy, BA
- Physics, BS
- Physics (Professional), BS
- Planned Program, BS or BA
- Plant Biology, BS
- Plant Biology: Biotechnology, BS
- Psychology, BA
- Psychology (Professional), BS
- Political Science, BA
- Political Science: Election and Campaign Management, BA
- Public and Nonprofit Administration, BA
- Public Health, BS
- Religious Studies, BA
- Social Work, BA
- Sociology, BA
- Sociology: Criminology, BA
- Women's and Gender Studies, BA
