= Steve Roccaforte =

American college basketball coach (born 1965)

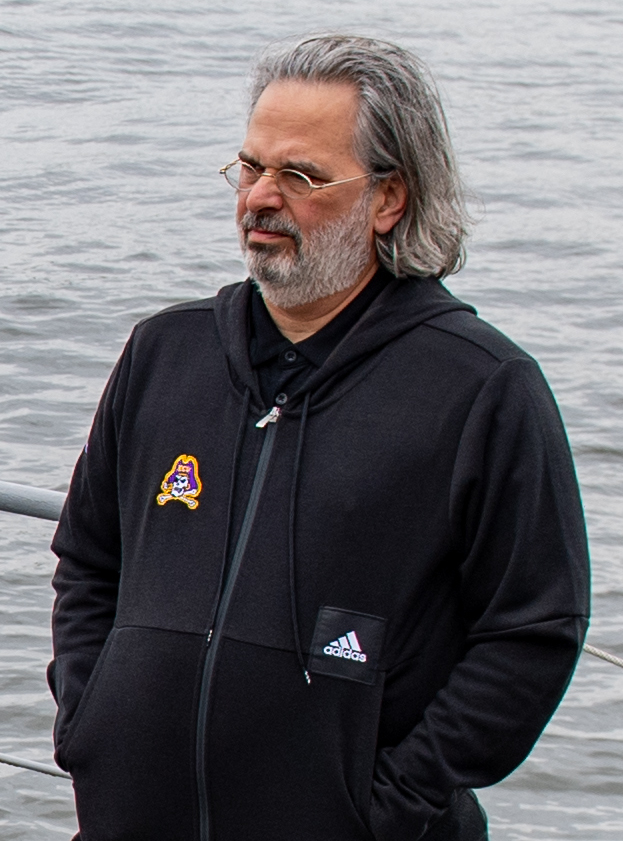
- Roccaforte in 2019

Current position
- Title: Assistant coach
- Team: Maryland
- Conference: Big Ten

Biographical details
- Born: May 21, 1965 (age 61)
- Education: Lamar University (1989)

Coaching career (HC unless noted)
- 1987–1989: Lamar (assistant)
- 1989–1994: Centenary (assistant)
- 1994–1998: Tulane (assistant)
- 1998–2000: Wyoming (assistant)
- 2000–2003: Memphis (assistant)
- 2003–2006: Lamar (assistant)
- 2006–2011: Lamar
- 2011–2014: South Florida (assistant)
- 2014–2018: Virginia Tech (assistant)
- 2018–2021: East Carolina (assistant)
- 2021–2025: Texas A&M (assistant)
- 2025–present: Maryland (assistant)

Head coaching record
- Overall: 76–78 (.494)

Accomplishments and honors

Championships
- Southland regular season (2008)

Steve Roccaforte (born May 21, 1965) is an American college basketball coach, currently an assistant men's basketball coach at Maryland. He joined Joe Dooley's staff on July 23, 2018, after four seasons as the associate head coach at Virginia Tech. Roccaforte also served as assistant coach for three seasons at the University of South Florida after serving as the head basketball coach at his alma mater Lamar University from 2006 to 2011, compiling a record of 76–78.

== Coaching career ==
With nearly 30 years of experience at the NCAA Division I level, Roccaforte has worked with some of the top coaches in the game and has recruited some of the top talent in the country. He has served under national coaches of the year in John Calipari, Perry Clark and Billy Tubbs and helped develop multiple nationally ranked recruiting classes. In addition to his stops as an assistant coach, Roccaforte was the head coach at Lamar University for five seasons (2006–11).

During his career, Roccaforte has coached or recruited such future NBA players as Larry Robinson (Centenary), Jerald Honeycutt (Tulane), Chris Owens (Tulane), Linton Johnson (Tulane), Josh Davis (Wyoming), Dejuan Wagner (Memphis), Antonio Burks (Memphis), Earl Barron (Memphis), Sean Banks (Memphis), Qyntel Woods (Memphis), Amare Stoudemire (Memphis), Kendrick Perkins (Memphis), Rodney Carney (Memphis) and Adrian Caldwell (Lamar).

On March 21, 2006, Roccaforte was named Lamar Cardinals head coach following Billy Tubbs' decision to drop his head coaching duties and devote full-time to his Lamar University athletic director duties. During the Roccaforte years (2006–11), the Cardinals notched wins over major programs including Texas Tech and BYU. In the 2007–2008 season, Roccaforte directed the Cardinals to the East Division Championship and a share of the Southland Conference regular season title with a 19 win season. He was named Southland Conference Coach of the Year by collegeinsider.com, sharing the honor with Stephen F. Austin's Danny Kaspar.

Roccaforte's tenure at Lamar was marked by some success and very highly ranked recruiting classes. Recruiting success has been a trademark of his throughout his coaching career. Known as a relentless recruiter, Roccaforte has helped put together Top 25 recruiting classes at South Florida (No. 12 being the highest), Tulane (No. 8), Memphis (No. 1) and Lamar (No. 6). Memphis had the nation's top rated recruiting class in 2001. Lamar's class in 2004, the first full recruiting class with Roccaforte on staff, was rated among the top 10 in the country by HoopScoop.com.

Roccaforte's penchant for recruiting was as evident as ever in 2009–10 as Lamar's eight-player class was ranked ninth by HoopScoopOnline.com and 15th-best in the nation by Basketball Times. The class featured three of the top 15 scorers in Junior College Division I.

As head coach at Lamar, Roccaforte led the Cardinals to the semifinals of the Southland Conference Tournament in his first season and guided LU to its first SLC regular-season championship in more than 20 years in his second season with an impressive 13-3 conference mark. He coached nine all-conference selections at Lamar.

The 2007–08 season featured a number of impressive streaks and great players. Among them were a 14–2 home record, a school-record six-consecutive conference road victories and the eighth-largest home crowd in school history. Lamar ranked eighth in the nation in scoring offense (81.5 ppg.) and in the top 50 in both field goal percentage (46.9) and 3-point field goal percentage (38.2). For his efforts, Roccaforte was named the 2007-08 Southland Conference Coach of the Year by the Lake Charles American-Press newspaper. Senior Lamar Sanders and Kenny Dawkins were both named first team All-SLC, with Dawkins matching his teammate as SLC Newcomer of the Year. The success of that season led to a top 25 ranking in the mid-major poll the following year.

Roccaforte served as an assistant coach at several universities before joining Tubbs' staff at Lamar University in June 2003.

Prior to being named to the top spot at Lamar, Roccaforte served for three seasons with the Cardinals as an assistant coach and recruiting coordinator under Tubbs. Roccaforte spent three years as an assistant coach at the University of Memphis before returning to Lamar. He helped the Tigers advance to the NIT final four in 2001, win the NIT championship in 2002 and advance to the NCAA Tournament in 2003 for the first time in seven years. Before Memphis, Roccaforte spent two seasons as an assistant coach on the Wyoming staff (1998–2000). Before heading to Wyoming, Roccaforte worked at Tulane. Roccaforte was an assistant coach at Centenary College for five seasons (1989–94).

Roccaforte's reputation in the coaching industry was well known during his rise through the ranks. He was listed as one of the top four assistant coaches ready to take over their own program according to Dan Wetzel of CBS Sportsline.com and was voted the seventh-best assistant coach in the country by Basketball Times for the 2002–03 season. Clark Francis of HoopScoop.com listed Roccaforte as the top mid-major assistant coach in the country in 2005.

Following Roccaforte's departure from Lamar, he joined Stan Heath's South Florida Bulls staff as an assistant coach, a position he held until moving to Virginia Tech. Roccaforte left South Florida when Buzz Williams took the head coaching job at Virginia Tech. Roccaforte was brought onto the Hokies' staff for his recruiting abilities.

On July 22, 2018, Roccaforte was hired to be assistant coach under Joe Dooley at East Carolina University.

== Head coaching record ==
Record table
Season	Team	Overall	Conference	Standing	Postseason
Lamar Cardinals (Southland Conference) (2006–2011)
2006–07	Lamar	15–17	8–8	T–3rd (East)	
2007–08	Lamar	19–11	13–3	1st (East)	
2008–09	Lamar	15–15	6–10	6th (West)	
2009–10	Lamar	14–18	5–11	6th (West)	
2010–11	Lamar	13–17	7–9	5th (East)	
Lamar:		76–78 (.494)	39–41 (.488)		
Total:		76–78 (.494)			
National champion Postseason invitational champion Conference regular season champion Conference regular season and conference tournament champion Division regular season champion Division regular season and conference tournament champion Conference tournament champion
