= James Gulley (basketball) =

US basketball player

Personal information
- Born: October 3, 1965 (age 61)
- Listed height: 6 ft 8 in (2.03 m)
- Listed weight: 260 lb (118 kg)

Career information
- High school: Newton (Newton, Texas)
- College: Lamar (1984–1988)
- NBA draft: 1988: undrafted
- Position: Center

Career history
- 1993–1994: Pepinster
- 1994–1997: Maccabi Rishon LeZion
- 1997: Sporting
- 1998–1999: Ironi Ramat Gan

Career highlights
- 3× Israeli Premier League Rebounding Leader (1995–1997); First-team All-Southland (1987); Second-team All-Southland (1985); Southland Newcomer of the Year (1985)

James Gulley (born October 3, 1965) is an American former professional basketball player, who played the center position. He played for Ironi Ramat Gan and Maccabi Ramat Gan in the Israeli Basketball Premier League, leading the league in rebounds for three consecutive seasons (1995–97).

== Basketball career ==
Gulley attended Newton High School in Texas, graduating in 1985. In 1984 he was named USA Today Honorable Mention.

He played basketball for Lamar University for four seasons, graduating in 1988. In 1986–87 Gulley led the Southland Conference with 288 rebounds and 9.9 rebounds per game, and was third with 19.8 points per game. In 1987–88 he was second in the American South Conference with 312 rebounds, was second with 10.1 rebounds per game, was third with 17.6 points per game, and was eighth with 0.6 blocks per game. He played in 113 career games for the Lamar Cardinals, and scored 1,832 points (16.2 ppg), had 967 rebounds (8.6 rpg), and 719 field goals, each of which is third all-time in school history. He was a four-time all-conference selection, named 1985 SLC Newcomer of the Year, and named 1988 All-American South Conference.

Gulley played for Maccabi Rishon LeZion in the Israeli Basketball Premier League from 1994 to 1997. In 1994–95 he led the league with 12.7 rebounds per game, in 1995–96 he again led it in rebounds, with 11.6 rebounds per game, and in 1996-94 he led the league in rebounds for a third consecutive season, with 10.2 per game. He played for Ironi Ramat Gan in the Israeli Basketball Premier League from 1998 to 1999.

== Honors ==
In 2013 Gulley was named by the Southland Conference to the 1980s all-decade men's basketball team.

He was inducted into the Cardinal Hall of Fame in 2019, and Gulley's Number 54 jersey was retired.

== Personal ==
Gulley is 6 ft 9 in (206 cm) tall, and weighs 260 pounds. His hometown is Newton, Texas. His son is professional basketball player Jarmar Gulley.

He was diagnosed with colon cancer, and later with an advanced form of colorectal cancer by 2013.
