= Luke Adams (basketball) =

American basketball player

Personal information
- Born: LaBelle, Florida, U.S.
- Listed height: 6 ft 7 in (2.01 m)
- Listed weight: 220 lb (100 kg)

Career information
- College: Florida SouthWestern (1967–1969); Lamar (1969–1971)
- NBA draft: 1971: 8th round, 132nd overall pick
- Drafted by: Los Angeles Lakers
- Position: Forward

Career highlights
- Southland Co-Player of the Year (1971); 2× First-team All-Southland (1970, 1971)
- Stats at Basketball Reference

Luke Adams is an American former basketball player. He played college basketball for the Lamar Cardinals from 1969 to 1971.

Adams was from LaBelle, Florida. He started his career with two seasons at Edison Junior College (now Florida SouthWestern State College) where he averaged 18.9 points and 20.3 rebounds during his sophomore season. Adams led the Lamar Cardinals in points and rebounds during the two seasons he played there. Adams was named as the Southland Player of the Year alongside Allan Pruett of the Arkansas State Red Wolves in 1971. He was a two-time selection to the All-Southland team.

Adams was selected by the Los Angeles Lakers as the 132nd overall pick in the 1971 NBA draft. He was also chosen by the Carolina Cougars in the 1971 American Basketball Association (ABA) draft. Adams had three agents unsuccessfully negotiate a contract with Cougars president Carl Scheer before he travelled 1,200 miles by car to personally meet with Scheer and discuss a deal. He signed with the Cougars on May 2, 1971.

Adams was inducted into the Lamar Cardinal Hall of Honor in 2000. In 2013, the Southland Conference announced he was a member of its 1970s All-Decade Men's Basketball Team.
