= Billy Tubbs =

American basketball player and coach (1935–2020)

- Tubbs, while coaching at Lamar

Biographical details
- Born: March 5, 1935; St. Louis, Missouri, U.S.
- Died: November 1, 2020 (aged 85); Norman, Oklahoma, U.S.
- Education: Lamar Tech (B.A.); Stephen F. Austin (M.A.)

Playing career
- 1953–1955: Lon Morris JC
- 1955–1957: Lamar Tech

Coaching career (HC unless noted)
- 1960–1971: Lamar Tech (assistant)
- 1971–1973: Southwestern (TX)
- 1973–1976: North Texas State (assistant)
- 1976–1980: Lamar
- 1980–1994: Oklahoma
- 1994–2002: TCU
- 2003–2006: Lamar

Administrative career (AD unless noted)
- 2002–2011: Lamar

Head coaching record
- Overall: 641–340
- Tournaments: 18–12 (NCAA Division I); 11–6 (NIT)

Accomplishments and honors

Championships
- NCAA Division I Regional—Final Four (1988); 2 Southland regular season (1979, 1980); 4 Big Eight regular season (1984, 1985, 1987, 1988); 3 Big Eight tournament (1985, 1988, 1990); WAC regular season (1998)

Awards
- 2x Southland Coach of the Year (1978, 1980); 4× Big Eight Coach of the Year (1984, 1985, 1988, 1989); WAC Coach of the Year (1998)

Billy Duane Tubbs (March 5, 1935 – November 1, 2020) was an American men's college basketball coach. The Tulsa, Oklahoma native was the head coach of his alma mater Lamar University (1976–1980, 2003–2006), the University of Oklahoma (1980–1994) and Texas Christian University (1994–2002). His first head coaching job — from 1971-72 through 1972-73 — was at Southwestern University, Georgetown, Texas, where his teams were 12–16 and 19–8. From there he went to the University of North Texas to serve as assistant coach under Gene Robbins and for one year under Bill Blakeley.

Tubbs was known for his high scoring offense and full-court press defense.

Tubbs achieved many coaching milestones during his coaching career. He became the ninth coach in NCAA history to record 100 wins at three different schools (Oklahoma 333, TCU 156 and Lamar 121). He became the 28th coach in NCAA Division I history to record 600 wins in Lamar's 79-67 win over Texas Southern during the 2003-04 season.

== Early life and college playing career ==
Born in St. Louis, Missouri, Tubbs grew up in Tulsa, Oklahoma and attended Central High School in Tulsa. Tubbs then attended Lamar State College of Technology (now Lamar University) in Beaumont, Texas and lettered in basketball from 1955 to 1957. As a junior in 1955–56, Tubbs averaged 6.7 points and 3.1 rebounds for Lamar Tech.

== Coaching career ==
Tubbs was an assistant at Lamar Tech from 1960 to 1971. Later, he was head coach at Southwestern University from 1971 to 1973. Tubbs was the assistant men's basketball coach at the University of North Texas for three seasons, 1973-74 & 1974-75 under head coach Gene Robbins and 1975-76 under head coach Bill Blakeley. In Blakeley's first season at North Texas, Tubbs, with newly hired assistant coach Jimmy Gales, helped turn around a team that had been 6-20 in 1975, to 22-4 in 1976, averaging 96 points a game – the second highest in the nation. After that season, Tubbs accepted his first head coaching job at Lamar University for the 1976-77 season.

In 31 years of coaching, Tubbs compiled a 641-340 (.653) career record, including a 121-89 record in seven years at Lamar. He guided 12 teams to NCAA tournament appearances, six National Invitation Tournament appearances, eight conference championships, three conference tournament championships and 18 20-win seasons. His 641 wins ranks 34th all-time in NCAA history. While at Oklahoma, Tubbs guided the Sooners to runner-up finishes in the NCAA Tournament (1988) and the National Invitation Tournament (1991). Basketball Weekly named Tubbs National Coach of the Year in 1983 and 1985. His 333 wins at OU are the most in school history.

On May 27, 2002, Tubbs returned to Lamar University as director of athletics. Ten months later, on March 21, 2003, he also became Lamar's head basketball coach for the second time. In March 2006, Tubbs resigned as head coach, but remained as director of athletics. He was succeeded by Steve Roccaforte. On June 14, 2010, Tubbs resigned as athletic director to become special advisor to Lamar University President James Simmons on athletics. He was succeeded by Larry Tidwell. Tubbs retired at the end of August 2011.

In a halftime ceremony on February 19, 2011, Lamar dedicated the Montagne Center basketball floor as the "Billy & Pat Tubbs Court", named in honor of the coach and his wife. During the same ceremony the school also honored Tubbs's 1978-79 Cardinals squad, the first team in Lamar University history to advance to the NCAA tournament.

== Death and legacy ==
Tubbs died in Norman, Oklahoma on November 1, 2020, after battling leukemia for five years. He was 85 years old. The long-time TCU basketball coach is immortalized in the Dallas-Fort Worth area by 'Fake Billy Tubbs' a recurring bit character on the prominent local sports radio station The Ticket. Tubbs is also remembered for doing a mean Jack Nicholson impression.

== Head coaching record ==
Record table
Season	Team	Overall	Conference	Standing	Postseason
Southwestern Pirates (Big State Conference) (1971–1973)
1971–72	Southwestern	12–16	7–5		
1972–73	Southwestern	19–8	9–3		
Southwestern:		31–24 (.564)	16–8 (.667))		
Lamar Cardinals (Southland Conference) (1976–1980)
1976–77	Lamar	12–17	6–4	3rd	
1977–78	Lamar	18–9	8–2	2nd	
1978–79	Lamar	23–9	9–1	1st	NCAA Division I Second Round
1979–80	Lamar	22–11	8–2	1st	NCAA Division I Sweet 16
Oklahoma Sooners (Big Eight Conference) (1980–1994)
1980–81	Oklahoma	9–18	4–10	7th	
1981–82	Oklahoma	22–11	8–6	3rd	NIT Semifinal
1982–83	Oklahoma	24–9	10–4	2nd	NCAA Division I Second Round
1983–84	Oklahoma	29–5	13–1	1st	NCAA Division I Second Round
1984–85	Oklahoma	31–6	13–1	1st	NCAA Division I Elite Eight
1985–86	Oklahoma	26–9	8–6	T–3rd	NCAA Division I Second Round
1986–87	Oklahoma	24–10	9–5	2nd	NCAA Division I Sweet 16
1987–88	Oklahoma	35–4	12–2	1st	NCAA Division I Runner-up
1988–89	Oklahoma	30–6	12–2	1st	NCAA Division I Sweet 16
1989–90	Oklahoma	27–5	11–3	T–2nd	NCAA Division I Second Round
1990–91	Oklahoma	20–15	5–9	T–6th	NIT Runner-up
1991–92	Oklahoma	21–9	8–6	T–2nd	NCAA Division I First Round
1992–93	Oklahoma	20–12	7–7	T–5th	NIT Second Round
1993–94	Oklahoma	15–13	6–8	5th	NIT First Round
Oklahoma:		333–132 (.716)	118–64 (.648)		
TCU Horned Frogs (Southwest Conference) (1994–1996)
1994–95	TCU	16–11	8–6	T–3rd	
1995–96	TCU	16–14	6–8	4th	
TCU Horned Frogs (Western Athletic Conference) (1996–2001)
1996–97	TCU	22–13	7–9	T–4th (Mountain)	NIT Second Round
1997–98	TCU	27–6	14–0	1st (Pacific)	NCAA Division I First Round
1998–99	TCU	21–11	7–7	T–4th (Mountain)	NIT Quarterfinal
1999–00	TCU	18–14	8–6	4th	
2000–01	TCU	20–11	9–7	4th	
TCU Horned Frogs (Conference USA) (2001–2002)
2001–02	TCU	16–15	6–10	T–4th (National)	
TCU:		156–95 (.622)	65–53 (.551)		
Lamar Cardinals (Southland Conference) (2003–2006)
2003–04	Lamar	11–18	5–11	10th	
2004–05	Lamar	18–11	9–7	5th	
2005–06	Lamar	17–14	9–7	T–4th	
Lamar:		121–89 (.576)	54–34 (.614)		
Total:		641–340 (.653)			
National champion Postseason invitational champion Conference regular season champion Conference regular season and conference tournament champion Division regular season champion Division regular season and conference tournament champion Conference tournament champion

== See also ==
- List of college men's basketball coaches with 600 wins
- List of NCAA Division I Men's Final Four appearances by coach
