= McDonald Gym =

Sports venue

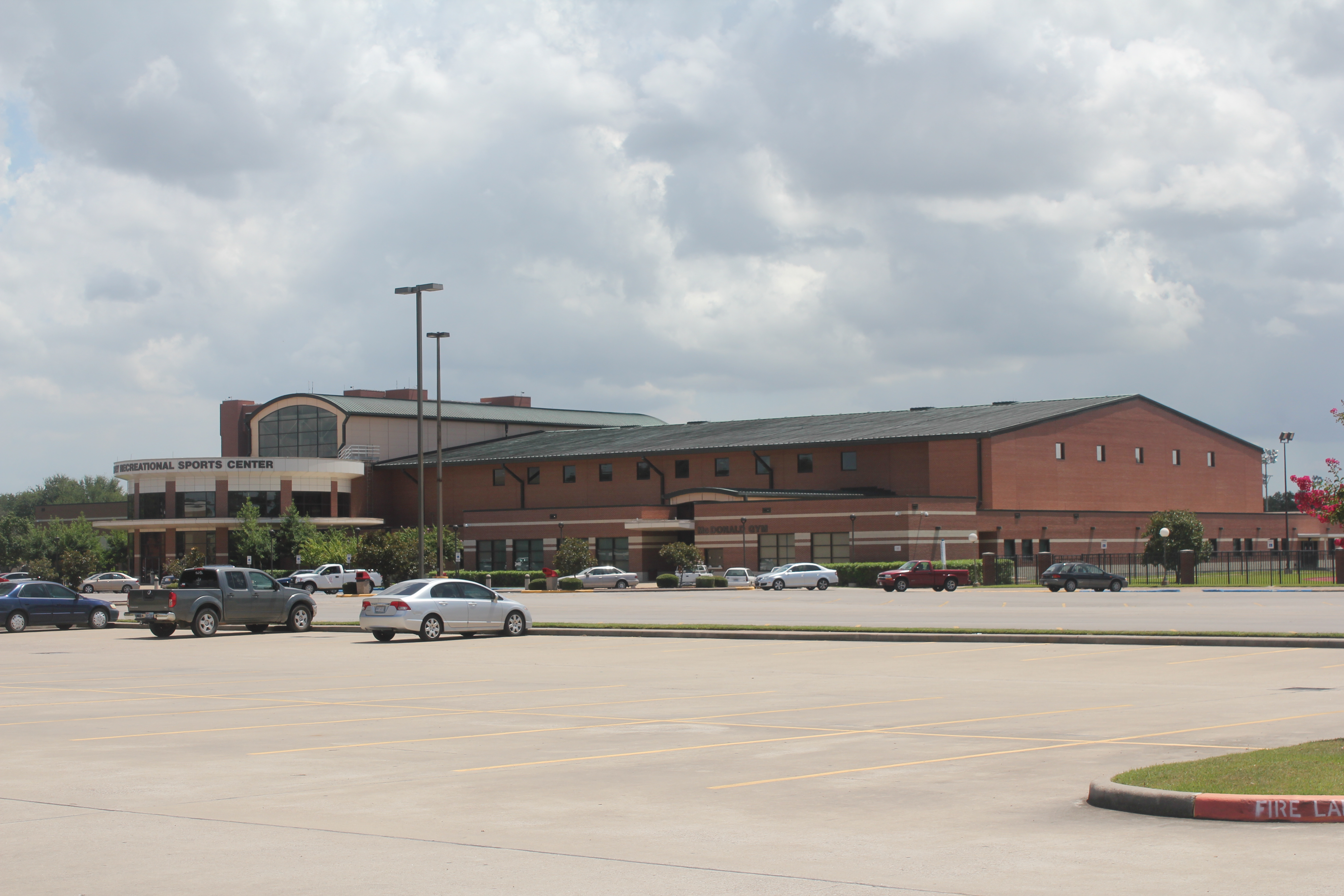
- Interactive map of McDonald Gym
- Location: Jimmy Simmons Boulevard and Dewey Street, Beaumont, TX
- Coordinates: 30°2′38″N 94°4′39″W
- Owner: Lamar University
- Operator: Lamar University
- Capacity: After renovation: 500; Before renovation: 4,200
- Surface: Maple wood floor

Construction
- Built: 1958
- Opened: 1958
- Renovated: 2006–07
- Expanded: 1985
- Cost: Original: $850,000; Renovation: part of a $17.8 million project
- Main contractors: Original: Chambers Construction Company, Houston; Renovation: Allco, LLC

Tenants
- Lamar Lady Cardinals volleyball Lamar Cardinals basketball (1958–1081); Lamar Lady Cardinals basketball (1969–1981)

McDonald Gym, built in 1958, is located on the campus of Lamar University in Beaumont, Texas. The building was completely renovated in 2006–07 as part of the $17.8-million, 126,000-sq-ft Sheila Umphrey Recreational Center project. The gym's seating capacity was reduced from 4,200 to 500 as part of the renovation. McDonald Gym has been the home of the Lamar Lady Cardinals volleyball team since the renovation. The facility was named after the fourth president of Lamar Dr. F.L. McDonald. (1952–1967) The original construction cost estimate in 1957–58 was $850,000. Chambers Construction Company of Houston, Texas was the main construction contractor. Allco, LLC was the main contractor for the 2006-07 renovation.

== Facility features ==
In addition to the competition volleyball arena, the facility has the following:

- Coaches offices for Volleyball, Cross Country, Tennis and Track & Field
- Separate team locker and shower facilities for each of the sports listed above. Shower and locker facilities are also provided for visiting teams, coaches, and officials.
- Athletic Training Suite - athletic training staff offices, treatment and rehabilitation areas, and hydrotherapy room
- Student athlete lounge
- Student athlete study center - four private study rooms, computer lab with 14 workstations, and offices for two Athletic Academic Affairs coordinators.

== Prior to 2007 ==
As a 4,200 seat gymnasium, prior to the 2007 renovation project, the gym was home to both the Lamar Cardinals men's basketball team and Volleyball team from 1958 until the 1980–81 season. It was also the home of the Lamar Lady Cardinals basketball team from 1969 to 1980–81. Following the 1980–81 season, the basketball teams called the off-campus Beaumont Civic Center home from 1980-1984 until the construction of the 10,080 seat Montagne Center in 1984 gave the basketball teams a new on-campus home.

=== Home court advantage ===
McDonald Gym was home of the men's basketball team for 23 years. The Cardinals had a home record of 220–65 (.772) during that period.

=== Postseason tournaments ===
- 1964 NCAA College Division basketball tournament Southwest Regional site

Over its life, the gym has also served as one of the venues for an annual YMBL South Texas Shootout high school basketball tournament held on the campus of Lamar University. In recent years, the Montagne Center also serves as another venue for the tournament. The tournament began in 1952.

=== 1968–69 season ===
As evidenced by the lopsided won/loss record when it was the home court for Lamar basketball, McDonald Gym was a tough place for an opponent to win. The 1968–69 season was a good example. That year, McDonald Gym was the home court of one of the more memorable seasons in Lamar Cardinals history. In addition to defeating several highly ranked NCAA Division I teams that season, Lamar defeated a previously unbeaten and sixth ranked Tulsa as well 1968 NCAA Men's Division I Basketball Tournament Final Four team, Houston at McDonald Gym. That season was featured in a February 3, 1969 article in Sports Illustrated.

=== 80-game home court winning streak ===
The men's basketball team's eighty (80) game home court winning streak started at McDonald Gym on February 18, 1978. Before the Cardinals moved to their new home at the Beaumont Civic Center, McDonald Gym saw the first thirty-seven (37) straight home wins of the streak. When the streak ended on March 10, 1984, the Cardinals were owners of seventh (7th) longest home court winning streak in NCAA history.
