= Clarence Kea =

American basketball player (born 1959)

Personal information
- Born: February 2, 1959 (age 67) Wilmington, North Carolina, U.S.
- Listed height: 6 ft 7 in (2.01 m)
- Listed weight: 218 lb (99 kg)

Career information
- High school: Hanover (Wilmington, North Carolina)
- College: Lamar (1976–1980)
- NBA draft: 1980: 8th round, 169th overall pick
- Drafted by: Dallas Mavericks
- Playing career: 1980–1994
- Position: Power forward
- Number: 53

Career history
- 1980–1981: Lehigh Valley Jets
- 1981: Dallas Mavericks
- 1981: Anchorage Northern Knights
- 1981–1982: Dallas Mavericks
- 1982–1983: Detroit Spirits
- 1983–1984: Virtus Banco di Roma
- 1984–1985: Hapoel Holon
- 1985–1986: Fantoni Udine
- 1986–1988: Limoges
- 1988–1991: Firenze
- 1991–1992: Juver Murcia
- 1992–1993: Ourense
- 1993–1994: Fenerbahçe

Career highlights
- EuroLeague champion (1984); 2× All-CBA Second Team (1981, 1983); CBA rebounding leader (1983); No. 54 retired by Lamar Cardinals
- Stats at NBA.com
- Stats at Basketball Reference

Clarence Leroy Kea (born February 2, 1959) is an American former professional basketball player. He was a 6-foot-6-inch (1.98 m) 218 pounds (99 kg) power forward.

== High school ==
Born in Wilmington, North Carolina, Kea attended New Hanover High School, in Wilmington, North Carolina, where he played high school basketball.

== College career ==
Kea played college basketball at Lamar University, with the Lamar Cardinals, from 1976 to 1980.

== Professional career ==
Kea was selected with the 9th pick, of the eighth round, in the 1980 NBA draft, by the Dallas Mavericks. After signing two 10-day contracts with the Mavericks, in 1981, he was signed for the remainder of the 1980–81 season, during which he played in 16 games, averaging 7.3 points and 4.2 rebounds per game. The next season (1981–82), he played in 35 games but his averages dipped to 2.3 points and 1.7 rebounds per game.

Kea played in the Continental Basketball Association (CBA) for the Lehigh Valley Jets, Anchorage Northern Knights and Detroit Spirits from 1980 to 1983. He was selected to the All-CBA Second Team in 1981 and 1983.

After his NBA career, Kea played professionally in Italy (Banco di Roma), Spain (Juver Murcia), Israel (Hapoel Holon), and France (Limoges).

He still holds the Liga ACB single-game record for rebounds (29).

== Career statistics ==
Legend
GP	Games played	GS	Games started	MPG	Minutes per game
FG%	Field goal percentage	3P%	3-point field goal percentage	FT%	Free throw percentage
RPG	Rebounds per game	APG	Assists per game	SPG	Steals per game
BPG	Blocks per game	PPG	Points per game	**Bold**	Career high

=== NBA ===
==== Regular season ====
Year	Team	GP	GS	MPG	FG%	3P%	FT%	RPG	APG	SPG	BPG	PPG
1980–81	Dallas	16		**12.4**	.457	.000	**.694**	**4.2**	.3	**.4**	**.1**	**7.3**
1981–82	Dallas	**35**	0	7.1	**.531**	–	.690	1.7	**.4**	.1	**.1**	2.3
Career		51	0	8.8	.485	.000	.692	2.5	.4	.2	.1	3.9
