= Mike Olliver =

American basketball player

Personal information
- Born: March 21, 1959 (age 67) Temple, Texas, U.S.
- Listed height: 6 ft 1 in (1.85 m)
- Listed weight: 195 lb (88 kg)

Career information
- High school: Southern Wayne (Dudley, North Carolina)
- College: Lamar (1977–1981)
- NBA draft: 1981: 2nd round, 32nd overall pick
- Drafted by: Chicago Bulls
- Position: Shooting guard

Career history
- 1982–1983: Las Vegas Silvers
- 1983: Lancaster Lightning

Career highlights
- Southland Player of the Year (1981); 3× First-team All-Southland (1979–1981)
- Stats at Basketball Reference

Michael Orlando Olliver (born March 21, 1959) is an American former basketball player. He is best known for his college career at Lamar University, where he was the Southland Conference Player of the Year in 1981.

Olliver was born in Temple, Texas, but his family moved to North Carolina, where he played high school basketball for Southern Wayne High School in Dudley. Olliver chose to play college basketball for Lamar and head coach Billy Tubbs and was a part of the Cardinals program's first three division I NCAA tournament appearances. Olliver was a three-time first-team All-Southland Conference pick and as a senior in 1981 was named the Southland Player of the Year after averaging 22.3 points per game. He also led the Cardinals to a Southland tournament title the same year and was named the tournament most valuable player. For his career, Olliver scored 2,518 points (20.6 per game), making him the leading scorer in school history. He also owns the school's single-game scoring mark with 50 points against Portland State.

After completing his college eligibility, Olliver was drafted in the second round (32nd pick overall) of the 1981 NBA draft by the Chicago Bulls. His rights were immediately traded to the Indiana Pacers, however he never played in the NBA. Olliver did play a season in the Continental Basketball Association (CBA), first for the Las Vegas Silvers, then moving to the Lancaster Lightning once the Silvers franchise folded. Olliver later became a high school coach in North Carolina, but was sentenced to 16 years in prison after stabbing his ex-girlfriend in 2007.
