= Alvin Brooks (basketball, born 1959) =

American basketball player and coach (born 1959)

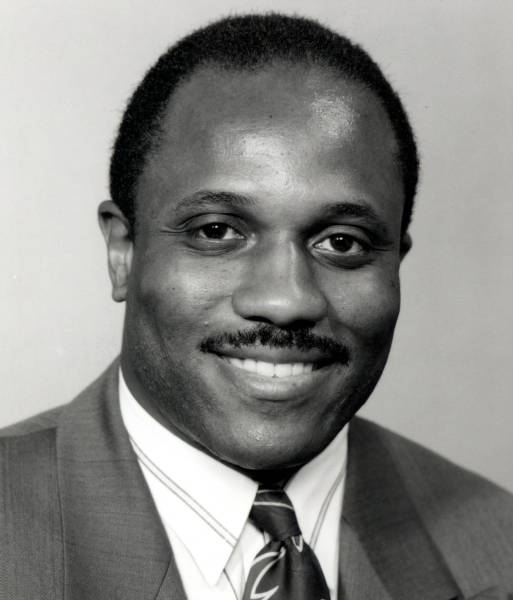
- Brooks as University of Houston head coach

Biographical details
- Born: August 6, 1959 (age 67); Houston, Texas, U.S.

Playing career
- 1977–1978: Sam Houston State
- 1978–1979: Henderson County JC
- 1979–1981: Lamar
- Position: Guard

Coaching career (HC unless noted)
- 1981–1986: Lamar (asst.)
- 1986–1993: Houston (asst.)
- 1993–1998: Houston
- 1999–2001: Texas Tech (asst.)
- 2001–2003: North Texas (asst.)
- 2003–2004: UTEP (asst.)
- 2004–2007: Texas A&M (asst.)
- 2010–2014: Houston (assoc. HC)
- 2014–2021: Houston (asst.)
- 2021–2026: Lamar

Administrative career (AD unless noted)
- 2007–2009: Kentucky (dir. of ops.)

Head coaching record
- Overall: 116–179 (.393)

Alvin Joseph Brooks Jr. (born August 6, 1959) is an American basketball coach, who was most recently the head coach of Lamar University's men's basketball team. Brooks returned to Lamar as men's basketball head coach on April 1, 2021. Prior to Lamar, he most recently served as an assistant coach for the Houston Cougars. Brooks has also served as Director of Basketball Operations for the Kentucky Wildcats. He coached the Houston Cougars from 1993 to 1998. He also served as an assistant coach for the Texas Tech Red Raiders basketball team and was at Texas A&M through the '06–'07 season.

== Playing career ==
Brooks was an award-winning player in college and high school. As a senior at Houston's Wheatley High School, he averaged 25.9 points and 9.0 assists per game on the way to earning All-City honors. He began his collegiate career in record-setting fashion at Sam Houston State, where he set the Bearkats' single-season record with 165 assists and was named the Lone Star Conference Freshman of the Year. He also received All-Lone Star Conference Honorable Mention after averaging 14.2 points and 5.2 assists per game.

Following his freshman season, he left SHSU and competed at Henderson County Junior College, leading the team to a 20–8 record as a sophomore.

Transferring to Lamar, Brooks was the starting point guard for two NCAA Tournament teams that posted a combined 47–6 record. As a junior, he led the 10th-seeded Cardinals into the Sweet 16 with a win against No. 5 Oregon State.

As a senior, he was an All-Southland Conference Second-Team selection after setting school records for single-game assists, season and career.

Brooks is a 1982 graduate of Lamar with a bachelor's degree in life and earth science with a minor in physical education.

Following his collegiate playing days, he was selected in the 10th round of the 1981 NBA draft by the San Antonio Spurs.

== Coaching career ==
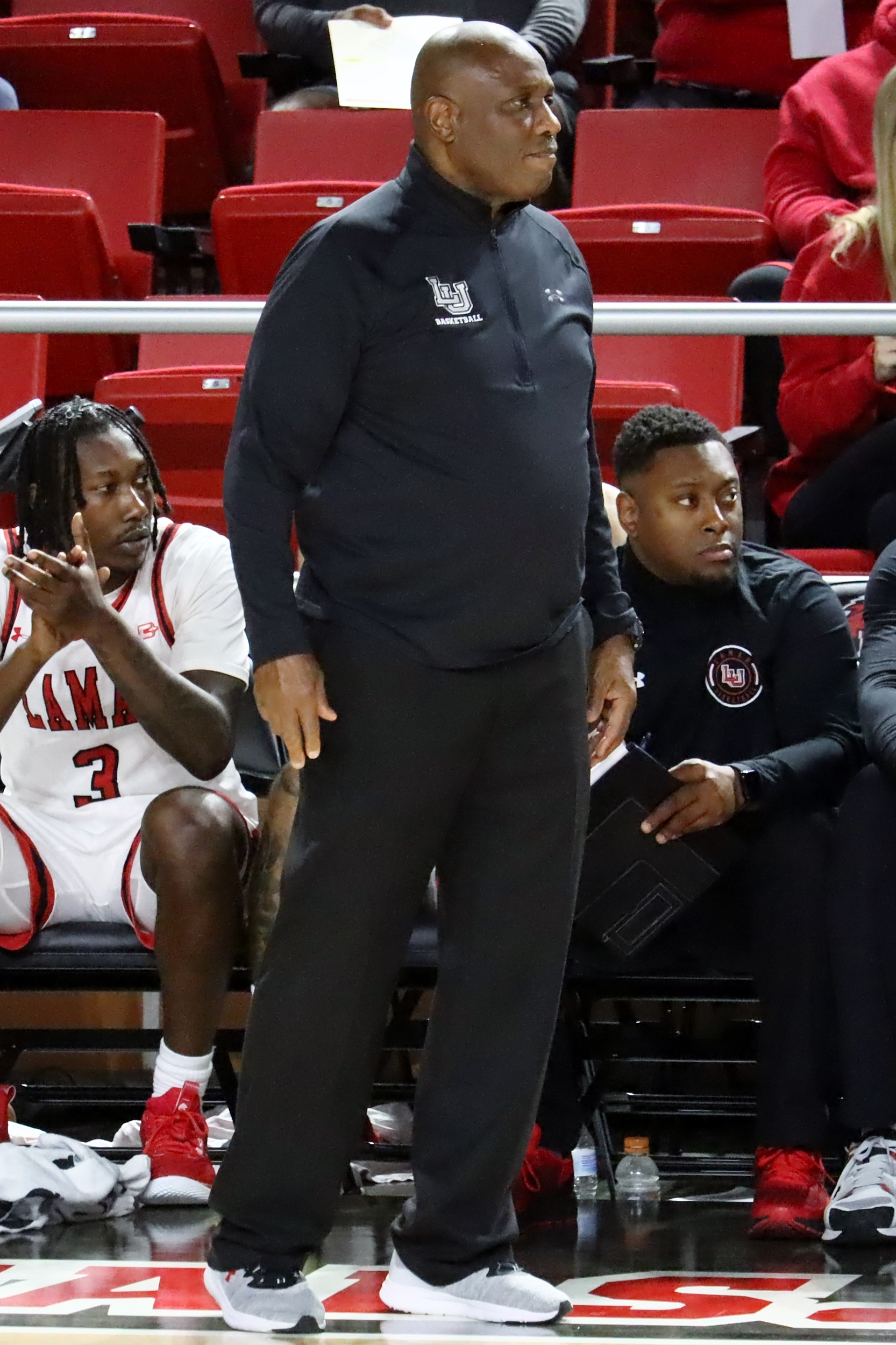
Brooks coaching Lamar in 2023.

Brooks began his coaching career as an assistant at Lamar in 1982. In five seasons on the sidelines with the Cardinals, he helped guide the program to a combined 115–44 record, two Southland Conference championships and five postseason tournament appearances.

In 1986, he first began his career at the University of Houston as an assistant coach. In seven seasons, he helped lead the Cougars to a 142–73 overall record with three NCAA Tournament appearances and three NIT berths. The Cougars also swept the 1992 Southwest Conference regular season and SWC Postseason Classic championships. He served as the head coach at Houston from 1993 to 1998, becoming the first African-American head coach in program history and one of the nation's youngest head coaches at that time. During his head coaching tenure, he led the Cougars to a 17–10 overall record and second-place finish in the Southwest Conference in 1995–96. The Cougars also enjoyed a pair of wins against nationally ranked teams that season against No. 3 Memphis and No. 19 Tulsa in double overtime.

Following his head coaching stint at Houston, Brooks served as an assistant coach at Texas Tech (1999–01) – where he worked on Dickey's staff—North Texas (2001–03), UTEP (2003–04) and Texas A&M (2004–07). Before rejoining the Cougars, Brooks worked as the director of operations at Kentucky from 2007 to 2009.

Returning to Houston in 2010–11, Brooks helped lead the Cougars to 12 wins, including a 76–71 upset of No. 19/18 UCF at Hofheinz Pavilion early in the Conference USA season. In 2011–12, Brooks helped guide the Cougars to wins against Arkansas and NCAA Tournament participant Southern Miss. In 2012–13, Brooks helped lead the Cougars to a 20–13 record—the program's first 20-win season since 2009—and a berth in the College Basketball Invitational quarterfinals following a thrilling 73–72 win against Texas inside Hofheinz Pavilion. During the 2013–14 season, the Cougars knocked off eventual national champion UConn in a New Year's Showdown inside Hofheinz Pavilion in the inaugural American Athletic Conference game for both programs. The Cougars went on to record three wins against nationally ranked opponents, the program's highest single-season total since 1983–84. In 2014–15, Houston overcame injuries throughout the season to win their final three regular-season games and upset Tulane in the First Round of the American Athletic Conference Championship. The Cougars also enjoyed a win against defending national champion UConn inside Hofheinz Pavilion. Brooks helped lead the Cougars to a 22–10 record in 2015–16—only the 15th 22-win season in program history—and a berth in the NIT for the first time in a decade. In 2016–17, the Cougars enjoyed their second straight 20-win season and competed in the NIT for the second straight year, a first for the program since 2005 and 2006.

In 2017–18 the Cougars enjoyed their third straight 20 win season with a 27–8 record and the team's first NCAA birth since 2010. The Cougars defeated the San Diego Aztecs in the first round and lost to the NCAA Runner Ups Michigan Wolverines at the buzzer in the 2nd round. In 2018–19 the Cougars had the best record in program history at 33–4 and won the conference title in the American Athletic Conference. The Cougars also made it to the Championship of the American Athletic Conference Tournament but lost to Cincinnati. The Cougars made it to the NCAA tournament for the second consecutive year and played Georgia State in the 1st round. They went on to play Ohio State in the 2nd round and won again. The Sweet 16 matchup of Kentucky and Houston was one of the tightest games of the year but Kentucky pulled out the win in the last 30 seconds. The Cougars were ranked in the Top 25 for 145 consecutive weeks and were ranked as high as #8.

In 37 years on the sidelines, Brooks has competed in 21 postseason tournaments as a coach or player. He has guided 18 players who competed in the NBA with a dozen more players playing professionally overseas. Brooks assisted Head Coach Kelvin Sampson in all aspects of the program, including recruiting, practices, skill development and opponents' scouting. During his tenure, the Cougars have enjoyed success in the classroom as well. Eleven student-athletes have been named to the conference All-Academic Team for posting a cumulative grade-point average of 3.0 or higher.

Brooks also has been active in the local community. Since arriving at Houston, Brooks and the Cougars have served Thanksgiving lunches to Star of Hope Mission residents, assisted in the unloading of more than 22 tons of pumpkins for a local church's fundraiser, moved furniture and equipment for local residents' Extreme Home Makeover and conducted a Texas Special Olympics event inside Hofheinz Pavilion.

== Personal life ==
Brooks and his wife Richelle have five children: daughter Andree and sons Casey, Julian, Vincent and Alvin III. The family lives in Houston. His son Alvin Brooks III is associate head coach at the University of Kentucky.

== Head coaching record ==
Record table
Season	Team	Overall	Conference	Standing	Postseason
Houston Cougars (Southwest Conference) (1993–1996)
1993–94	Houston	8–19	5–9	6th	
1994–95	Houston	9–19	5–9	6th	
1995–96	Houston	17–10	11–3	2nd	
Houston Cougars (Conference USA) (1996–1998)
1996–97	Houston	11–16	3–11	4th (White)	
1997–98	Houston	9–20	2–14	T–5th (National)	
Houston:		54–84 (.391)	26–46 (.361)		
Lamar Cardinals (Western Athletic Conference) (2021–2022)
2021–22	Lamar	2–27	0–18	13th	
Lamar Cardinals (Southland Conference) (2022–2026)
2022–23	Lamar	9–22	5–13	10th	
2023–24	Lamar	19–14	12–6	4th	
2024–25	Lamar	20–13	14–6	2nd	
2025–26	Lamar	12–19	7–15	T–9th	
Lamar:		62–95 (.395)	38–58 (.396)		
Total:		116–179 (.393)			
