= B. B. Davis =

American basketball player

Personal information
- Born: c. 1960 Beaumont, Texas, U.S.
- Listed height: 6 ft 8 in (2.03 m)
- Listed weight: 218 lb (99 kg)

Career information
- High school: French (Beaumont, Texas)
- College: Lamar (1977–1981)
- NBA draft: 1981: 4th round, 82nd overall pick
- Drafted by: Kansas City Kings
- Position: Power forward

Career highlights
- 3× First-team All-Southland (1978, 1979, 1981); Second-team All-Southland (1980); No. 52 retired by Lamar Cardinals

B. B. Davis (born c. 1960) is an American former basketball player who is best known for his college career at Lamar University between 1977–78 and 1980–81.

== College career ==
Born in Beaumont, Texas, Davis stayed in his hometown to play basketball for Lamar. He stands 6'8" and weighed 218 pounds at his prime while playing the power forward position. He instantly made an impact as a true freshman, starting for the team right away as he averaged a team-leading 17.6 points and 10.2 rebounds per game. That season, the Cardinals finished 18–9 overall (8–2 conference) and won the first of four consecutive Southland Conference regular season championships.

In 1978–79, Davis' sophomore year, he had the best personal season of his career. He averaged 20.2 points and 10.8 rebounds per game while amassing 651 points and 344 rebounds. These figures still rank in Lamar's top ten and top five single season efforts, respectively. Behind the record of 23–9 (9–1), the Cardinals earned their first-ever berth into the NCAA Division I men's basketball tournament. Ranked as the #10 seed in the Midwest Region, they defeated nationally ranked and #7 seed Detroit, 95–87, to advance to the second round. They then lost by 31 points to the eventual national champion Michigan State Spartans who were led by Earvin "Magic" Johnson.

As a junior in 1979–80, Davis averaged 16.5 points and 8.6 rebounds per game. Despite the dip in his statistics, he did record a career-high 2.5 blocks per game, and his 75 blocked shots set a still-standing single season school record. Lamar finished atop the Southland Conference yet again with a 22–11 (8–2) record, and for the second consecutive season earned a trip to the NCAA Tournament. As the #10 seed, they edged #7 Weber State, 87–86, in the first round. Their second round opponent was the #2 seed and fourth-ranked team in the nation, Oregon. Lamar produced one of the biggest upsets of that year's tournament by defeating them, 81–77, and advancing to their first-ever Sweet 16. The #6 seed Clemson Tigers knocked the Cardinals out the next game, however, 74–66, thus ending their season.

In his final season, Davis' overall numbers were the lowest of his career. He still averaged 15.4 points and 8.1 rebounds per game for the year, but he appeared in just 20 games (seven fewer than his previous career-low). Despite this, Davis earned his third First Team All-Conference selection (he received Second Team honors as a junior) and he led the Cardinals to both the regular season and conference tournament championships, the latter being the first in school history. Lamar finished 25–5 (8–2) and advanced to the second round of the NCAA Tournament for a third straight year.

During Davis' four-year college career, he compiled career totals of 2,084 points and 1,122 rebounds in 119 games played. He is in an exclusive club of Division I men's basketball players to reach both milestones in a career.

The National Basketball Association's Kansas City Kings selected him in the fourth round (82nd overall) in the 1981 NBA draft, although Davis never played in the league.

== Awards and honors ==
- Four-time all-conference selection
  - First Team (1978, 1979, 1981)
  - Second Team (1980)
- Southland Conference All-Tournament Team (1981)
- Two-time USBWA All-District VI Team (1980, 1981)
- School's second all-time leading scorer (2,084) and second all-time leading rebounder (1,122)
  - Career 2000-point, 1000-rebound performer
- Jersey number retired (#52)
- Lamar's record during his tenure was 88–34 overall (33–7 conference)
  - Has a career NCAA Tournament winning record (4–3)
- Named one of the five greatest players in Lamar men's basketball history in the 2009 book, ESPN College Basketball Encyclopedia: The Complete History of the Men's Game
- "Cardinal Hall of Honor" inductee in 1992
