= Dudley, North Carolina =

- Census-designated place
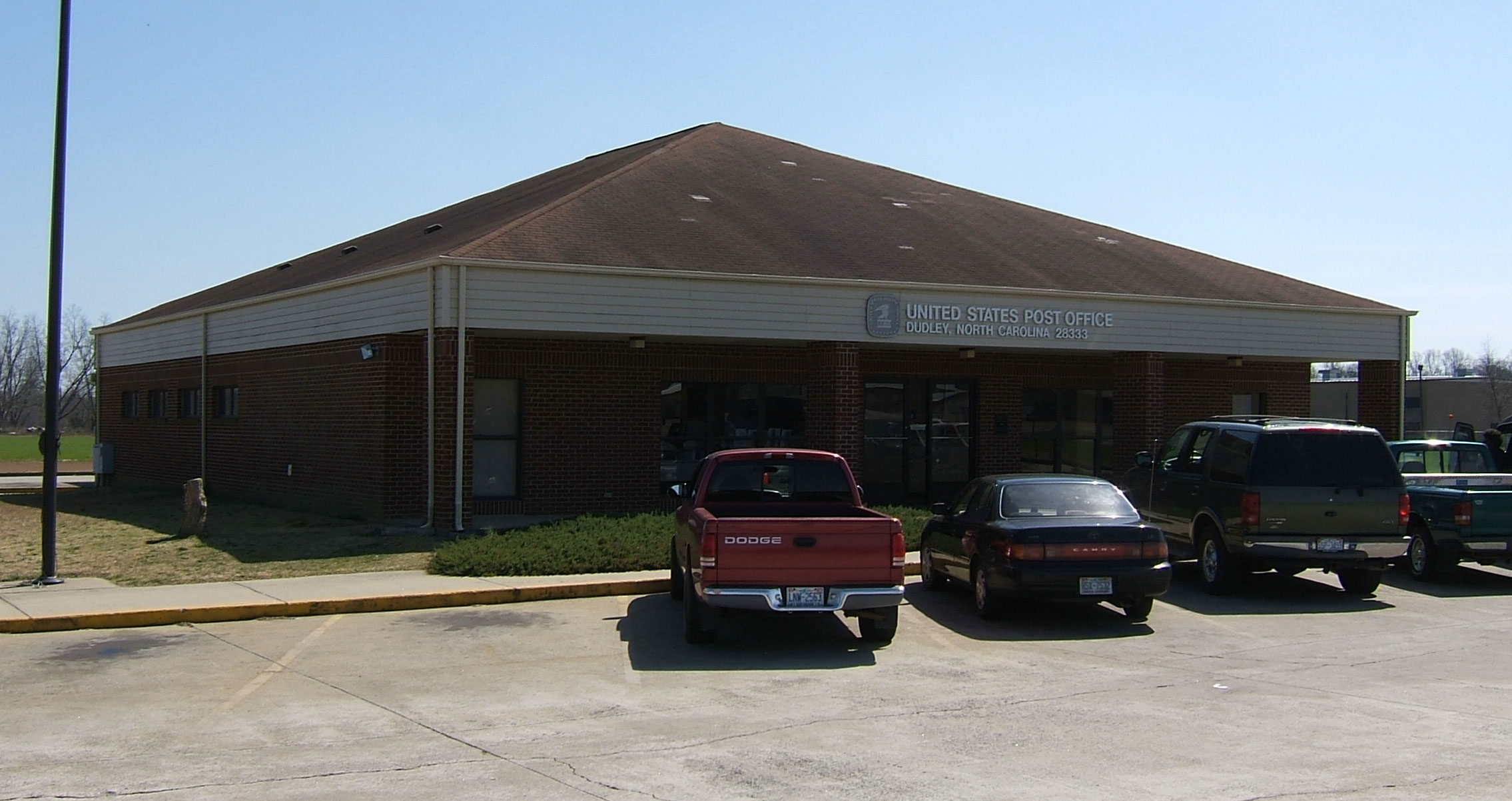
- Post Office in Dudley

- Location within North Carolina Location within the United States
- Coordinates: 35°15′58″N 78°02′18″W
- Country: United States
- State: North Carolina
- County: Wayne

Area
  - Total: 2.76 sq mi (7.16 km^{2})
  - Land: 2.76 sq mi (7.15 km^{2})
  - Water: 0.0039 sq mi (0.01 km^{2})
- Elevation: 184 ft (56 m)

Population (2020)
  - Total: 826
  - Density: 299.3/sq mi (115.56/km^{2})
- Time zone: UTC-5 (Eastern (EST))
  - Summer (DST): UTC-4 (EDT)
- ZIP code: 28333
- Area codes: 919 and 984
- GNIS feature ID: 2812802

Dudley is an unincorporated community and census-designated place (CDP) in Wayne County, North Carolina, United States, about 9 miles south of Goldsboro. It was first listed as a CDP in the 2020 census with a population of 826. Dudley is included in the Goldsboro, North Carolina Metropolitan Statistical Area.

== History ==
Another town named Dudley originally existed several miles north from its current location. It was founded by Labon Lewis, the son of a Revolutionary soldier, named for his deceased brother Dudley Lewis. On January 13, 1840, a post office was established for this town. This office's name was later changed to Everettsville, which was moved to a new location in 1849 and was closed in 1866.

The second and present town bearing the name was set up around 1836-1840 as a camp for the Wilmington & Weldon Railroad. This time, however, it was named for Governor Edward B. Dudley, the railroad's founder. In the years in which the village grew, it gained a depot and a passenger station. Its post office was established on February 3, 1850.

In December 1862, during the Battle of Goldsborough Bridge, a number of buildings and railroad cars were destroyed in Dudley by the Union Army under Maj. Gen. John G. Foster.

Dudley was incorporated in 1897, with J. W. Hatch elected as the town's first mayor. The town's government lasted for many years until eventually no more officials were elected and the incorporation ended.

The Georgia Pacific Corporation opened a facility in Dudley in 1973 and now employs over 625 people.

== Demographics ==
Historical population
| Census | Pop. | Note | %± |
|---|---|---|---|
| 2020 | 826 | | — |
U.S. Decennial Census; 2020

=== 2020 census ===
Dudley CDP, North Carolina - Demographic Profile (NH = Non-Hispanic)
| Race / Ethnicity | Pop 2020 | % 2020 |
|---|---|---|
| White alone (NH) | 148 | 17.92% |
| Black or African American alone (NH) | 335 | 40.56% |
| Native American or Alaska Native alone (NH) | 0 | 0.00% |
| Asian alone (NH) | 0 | 0.00% |
| Pacific Islander alone (NH) | 2 | 0.24% |
| Some Other Race alone (NH) | 2 | 0.24% |
| Mixed Race/Multi-Racial (NH) | 31 | 3.75% |
| Hispanic or Latino (any race) | 308 | 37.29% |
| Total | 826 | 100.00% |

Note: the US Census treats Hispanic/Latino as an ethnic category. This table excludes Latinos from the racial categories and assigns them to a separate category. Hispanics/Latinos can be of any race.

== Education ==
Education in Dudley is administered by the Wayne County Public School system with children attending classes at Brogden Primary School, Brogden Middle School and Southern Wayne High School. Higher education is offered through Wayne Community College in Goldsboro and Mount Olive College in Mount Olive.

== Transportation ==
=== Passenger ===
- Air: Raleigh-Durham International Airport is the closest major airport with service to more than 45 domestic and international destinations. Goldsboro-Wayne Municipal Airport is an airport located nearby, but is only used for general aviation.
- Interstate Highway: I-795 is the closest Interstate to Dudley, which is located 9 miles north in Goldsboro.
- Dudley is not served directly by passenger trains. The closest Amtrak station is located in Selma.
- Bus: The area is served by Greyhound with a location in nearby Goldsboro.

=== Roads ===
- The main highway in Dudley is US 117.

== Notable people ==
- Cecil Exum, former University of North Carolina and Australian NBL basketball player
- Linwood Forte, serial killer
- Tim Pratt, science fiction/fantasy writer and poet
- Greg Warren, American football player
