= Lamar Cardinals basketball =

American college basketball team

2026–27 Lamar Cardinals basketball team
- University: Lamar University
- First season: 1923
- Head coach: Jordan Fee (1st season)
- Location: Beaumont, Texas
- Arena: Montagne Center (capacity: 10,080)
- Conference: Southland
- Nickname: Cardinals
- Colors: Red and white
- Student section: The Flock

NCAA Division I tournament Sweet Sixteen
- 1963*, 1980

NCAA Division I tournament appearances
- 1960*, 1962*, 1963*, 1964*, 1966*, 1979, 1980, 1981, 1983, 2000, 2012

Conference tournament champions
- 1981, 1983, 2000, 2012

Conference regular-season champions
- 1961, 1962, 1963, 1964, 1970, 1979, 1980, 1981, 1983, 1984, 2008, 2012

Conference division champions
- Southland: 2008, 2012 (East)

Uniforms
Home	Away
- * at Division II level

The Lamar Cardinals basketball team represents Lamar University in NCAA Division I men's basketball competition. The Cardinals currently play in the Southland Conference following a return from the Western Athletic Conference on July 11, 2022. They were one of four programs, all from Texas, that left the Southland Conference on July 1, 2021, to join the Western Athletic Conference (WAC). Lamar left the Southland Conference for the second time, having initially joined at the league's formation in 1963, left in 1987, and returned in 1999. After one season in the WAC, Lamar returned to the Southland Conference. The Cardinals have played home games in the Montagne Center since 1984.

The Lamar University basketball team is one of the school's most storied athletic programs. The Cardinals have appeared six times in the NCAA Division I men's basketball tournament, most recently in 2012. The 1979–80 team appeared in the Sweet 16 at the 1980 NCAA tournament, its deepest tournament run in program history with upset wins over 7-seed Weber State and 2-seed Oregon State. The Cardinals made its most recent appearance in the Round of 32 in 1983 after an upset win over 6-seed Alabama.

== History ==
=== Early years ===
Basketball began in 1923 with the founding of South Park Junior College (renamed Lamar in 1932). In the early years the squad was hurt by a lack of common opponents and routinely had to play local high schools or city amateur teams. By 1931 the squad had been reduced to an intramural level. In 1946 the program was revived as Lamar entered the Southwestern Junior College Conference. The revived squad was an immediate success finishing 2nd with a 10–4 record by head coach Dave Engman. The next year under the veteran coaching of Elbert Pickell the 1947–1948 team pulled an enormous upset by capturing the state title with a 13–3 record. The following year the Cardinals continued to prosper under head coach Thurman "Slue" Hull who complied 49–30 record at Lamar before being hired away by the University of Texas. The following year the Cardinals began their transition to play against 4 year college competition with newly hired head coach Jack Martin.

Record table
Early Years – Year by Year Record
Season	Team	Overall	Conference	Standing	Postseason
South Park Junior College (Independent) (1924–1930)
1924–1925		8–7			
1925–1926		4–6			
1926–1927		6–3			
1927–1928	J. D. Conn	9–2			
1928–1929	Derrill Jones	N/A			
1929–1930	Derrill Jones	N/A			
South Park Junior College (No Team or Intramural Team) (1930–1946)
Lamar Junior College (Southwestern Junior College Conference) (1946–1951)
1946–1947	Dave Engman	10–4			
1947–1948	Elbert Pickell	13–3			State Junior College Championship
1948–1949	Slue Hull	22–6			
1949–1950	Slue Hull	14–12			Consolation Championship (State JC Tournament)
Lamar Junior College (Transition to four year college) (1950–1951)
1950–1951	Slue Hull	13–12			
Lamar:		99–55 (.643)			
Total:		99–55 (.643)			
National champion Postseason invitational champion Conference regular season champion Conference regular season and conference tournament champion Division regular season champion Division regular season and conference tournament champion Conference tournament champion

=== Jack Martin years ===
Jack Martin was the first head basketball coach for Lamar as a four-year college. He was also the longest serving head coach in Lamar's history. He came to Lamar after coaching three seasons at his alma mater, Hardin-Simmons University. Martin began coaching the Cardinals as they entered the college division Lone Star Conference in 1951. Martin coached Billy Tubbs from 1955 to 1957, Tubbs would later become the first player or student to return and coach Lamar Basketball. In 1964 Lamar began its transition into division I and the Southland Conference. Coach Martin's Cardinals won the Lone Star Conference title three seasons, the Southland Conference title two seasons, and competed in five NCAA College Division (now NCAA Division II) tournaments. After the 1975–76 season, Coach Martin was replaced by one of his former players and former assistant coach, Billy Tubbs. The Cardinals compiled a 334–283 record under Martin.

Martin coached one AP NCAA College Division All-American, Don Bryson (1965), and one AP NCAA Division I All-American, Earl Dow (1969). One of Coach Martin's players, Luke Adams, was drafted by the NBA.

1968–69 Season

The highlight of Jack Martin's career would be his 1968–1969 squad that earned a #1 national ranking in the Associated Press college division poll. Martin's squad that year won its first 15 games of the season against very strong competition. The Cardinals won their first game against Pepperdine 65–64 then traveled to Memphis and beat a strong Memphis State team, 82–69. A week later, they quieted a stunned crowd in College Station's G. Rollie White Coliseum by strumming Southwest Conference champion Texas A&M, 98–87. With the Cardinals sitting at 6–0 and sixth-ranked University of Tulsa coming to town, most observers figured the good times were at an end. Instead, they kept rolling as Martin's flashy Cards decked Tulsa, 103–77.

"Since we had gone 8–17 the previous season, what that team did to start that year has to be one of the greatest surprises ever in Lamar basketball, at least up until that point," said Joe Lee Smith, then LU's director of sports information. "They beat a good Pepperdine team and an outstanding Memphis State team to get started, then they beat Texas A&M on the road, which was totally unexpected.

"Tulsa was ranked No. 6, but we kicked the dog out of them. That triggered a lot of national attention. It was the first year for us to be fully Division I, and after that win we started getting a few votes in the major college polls."

After the Cardinals held off Arkansas State 84–81 in Jonesboro to tie the school record of 12-straight wins, they rose to No. 18 in the United Press International major college poll. They were the only team ranked in both polls.

A few nights later, the prominent Houston Cougars, who had been to the Final Four the previous season, came to McDonald Gym. Coach Guy Lewis' Cougars had never lost to Lamar, up until this point. With 8:15 left in the game, the Cardinals trailed 56–44, but they rallied to go ahead 61–59 in the final minute. The Cougars scored in the final seconds, however, and the teams went into overtime tied at 61.

The overflow throng in McDonald Gym and those viewing the game by closed-circuit television in a nearby dining hall erupted into bedlam when forward Jim Nicholson stole the ball and went in for a layup seconds after the overtime tipoff. Then, spindly guard Earl Dow popped in a corner jumper to give the Cards a four-point lead, and they controlled the rest of overtime, winning 71–65.

On a cold Feb. 1 night in Abilene, the record streak reached 15 games with an 85–72 victory over Abilene Christian. Two nights later on "The Stage" in Arlington, it ended with a 76–71 loss to Texas–Arlington.

Record table
Jack Martin – Year by Year Record
Season	Team	Overall	Conference	Standing	Postseason
Lamar Cardinals (Lone Star Conference) (1951–1963)
1951–1952	Lamar	7–16	1–9	6th	
1952–1953	Lamar	11–12	4–6	4th	
1953–1954	Lamar	13–11	4–6	4th	
1954–1955	Lamar	11–14	5–7	5th	
1955–1956	Lamar	12–12	7–5	4th	
1956–1957	Lamar	14–11	5–9	5th	
1957–1958	Lamar	10–12	3–11	8th	
1958–1959	Lamar	17–7	9–5	2nd	
1959–1960	Lamar	18–9	11–3	3rd	NCAA College Division Tournament
1960–1961	Lamar	19–8	12–2	1st	
1961–1962	Lamar	20–8	13–1	1stT	NCAA College Division Tournament
1962–1963	Lamar	22–5	12–2	1stT	NCAA College Division Tournament
Lamar Cardinals (Southland Conference) (1963–1976)
1963–1964	Lamar	19–6	7–1	1st	NCAA College Division Tournament
1964–1965	Lamar	18–6	5–3	3rd	
1965–1966	Lamar	17–9	4–4	2nd	NCAA College Division Tournament
1966–1967	Lamar	5–19	0–8	6th	
1967–1968	Lamar	8–17	3–5	5th	
1968–1969	Lamar	20–4	6–2	2nd	
1969–1970	Lamar	15–9	7–1	1st	
1970–1971	Lamar	11–13	5–3	2nd	
1971–1972	Lamar	13–13	7–1	2nd	
1972–1973	Lamar	11–13	6–6	4th	
1973–1974	Lamar	6–19	0–4	3rd	
1974–1975	Lamar	7–16	4–4	3rd	
1975–1976	Lamar	10–14	6–4	3rd	
Lamar:		334–283 (.541)			
Total:		375–323 (.537)			
National champion Postseason invitational champion Conference regular season champion Conference regular season and conference tournament champion Division regular season champion Division regular season and conference tournament champion Conference tournament champion

=== Billy Tubbs years ===
Coach Tubbs (1976–1980) was the first former player and alumnus to coach the Lamar men's basketball team. Tubbs led the Cardinals to their first NCAA Division I basketball tournament in 1979. The tenth seeded Cardinals upset the number seven seed Detroit before falling to tournament champion Michigan State in the second round. The following year, the Cardinals under Coach Tubbs, had a Cinderella story in the 1980 NCAA basketball tournament as a ten seed advancing to the Sweet 16. The Cardinals defeated number seven seed Weber State and number two seed Oregon State before falling to six seed Clemson.

Coach Tubbs left the Cardinals after the 1979–1980 season to take the head basketball coach job at Oklahoma. During Tubbs's reign at Lamar he recruited one player, Mike Olliver who would become an all-American for Lamar. One of Coach Tubbs' recruits, Clarence Kea, was drafted by the NBA while Tubbs was still at Lamar. Three other Tubbs recruited players, Mike Olliver, B. B. Davis, and Alvin Brooks, were drafted the year following Tubbs' departure.

The 1979 Cardinal Basketball team set records when it beat Portland State University 141–84; at the time, that game set an NCAA record for points in a single game. During the game, Mike Olliver set the single game scoring record at Lamar with 50 points; that record stood until January 4, 2011.

Coach Tubbs' Cardinals began the 80 game seventh longest NCAA home court winning streak (discussed below) winning the first 31 games.

Record table
Billy Tubbs (1st time) – Year by Year Record
Season	Team	Overall	Conference	Standing	Postseason
Lamar Cardinals (Southland Conference) (1976–1980)
1976–1977	Lamar	12–17	6–4	3rd	
1977–1978	Lamar	18–9	8–2	2nd	
1978–1979	Lamar	23–9	9–1	1st	NCAA 2nd Round
1979–1980	Lamar	22–11	8–2	1st	NCAA Sweet 16
Lamar:		75–46 (.620)			
Total:		640–340 (.653)			
National champion Postseason invitational champion Conference regular season champion Conference regular season and conference tournament champion Division regular season champion Division regular season and conference tournament champion Conference tournament champion

=== Pat Foster years ===
Pat Foster (1980–1986) was hired to replace Billy Tubbs. Foster came to Lamar as an assistant coach under Eddie Sutton at Arkansas. He continued Lamar's men's basketball success by leading the Cardinals to 3 Southland Conference titles and post season play each of the six years he was head coach at Lamar. Post-season included two (2) NCAA Tournament appearances advancing to the second round in both. The Cardinals also participated in the NIT four (4) times advancing to the second round once. The Cardinals won twenty (20) or more games five of Coach Foster's six seasons at Lamar. He coached one All-American, two Southland Conference Players of the Year, two Southland Conference Newcomers of the Year, seven Southland Conference First Team selections and fifteen All-Southland Conference team selections. Not including three players recruited by Billy Tubbs' staff, five of Coach Foster's recruits were drafted by the NBA. Those players were Terry Long, Lamont Robinson, Tom Sewell, Jerry Everett, and Greg Anderson."

After turning down the Houston Cougars head coaching position once, Foster resigned as Lamar's head coach in April, 1986 to take the head coaching position at Houston following Guy Lewis's retirement. Pat Foster was named to the Lamar Hall of Honor in 2014 in recognition of his contributions to the program as Lamar coach and athletic director. His record at Lamar of 134 wins ranks as second in the history of the program.

Coach Foster's Cardinals continued the 80 game seventh longest NCAA home court winning streak (discussed below) with 49 consecutive home court wins.

Record table
Pat Foster – Year by Year Record
Season	Team	Overall	Conference	Standing	Postseason
Lamar (Southland Conference) (1980–1986)
1980–1981	Lamar	25–5	8–2	1st	NCAA (2nd Round)
1981–1982	Lamar	22–7	7–3	2nd	NIT (1st Round)
1982–1983	Lamar	23–8	9–3	1st	NCAA (2nd Round)
1983–1984	Lamar	26–5	11–1	1st	NIT (2nd Round)
1984–1985	Lamar	20–12	8–4	3rd	NIT (2nd Round)
1985–1986	Lamar	18–12	6–6	T-4th	NIT (1st Round)
Lamar:		134–49 (.732)	49–19		
Total:		366–203 (.643)			
National champion Postseason invitational champion Conference regular season champion Conference regular season and conference tournament champion Division regular season champion Division regular season and conference tournament champion Conference tournament champion

=== Tom Abatemarco years ===
Tom Abatemarco (1986–1988) was hired in 1986. He was previously an assistant coach for the North Carolina State Wolfpack under Jimmy Valvano serving there from 1982 to 1986. Coach Abatemarco's first season record as head coach at Lamar was a disappointing 14–15 (4–6 SLC). The next season saw a new conference and a better record. The Cardinals posted a 20–11 overall and a 5–5 conference record in the newly created American South Conference. Abatemarco left Lamar after his second year accepting a head coaching position at Drake University.

James Gulley played basketball for Lamar University for four seasons, including during the tenure of Abatemarco, graduating in 1988. In 1986–87 Gulley led the Southland Conference with 288 rebounds and 9.9 rebounds per game. He played in 113 career games for the Cardinals, and scored 1,832 points (16.2 ppg), had 967 rebounds (8.6 rpg), and 719 field goals, each of which is third all-time in school history. He was a four-time all-conference selection, and named 1988 All-American South Conference.

Record table
Tom Abatemarco – Year by Year Record
Season	Team	Overall	Conference	Standing	Postseason
Lamar (Southland Conference) (1986–1987)
1986–1987	Lamar	14–15	4–6	4th	
Lamar (American South Conference) (1987–1988)
1987–1988	Lamar	20–11	5–5	3rd	
Lamar:		34–26 (.567)	9–11		
Total:		70–121 (.366)			
National champion Postseason invitational champion Conference regular season champion Conference regular season and conference tournament champion Division regular season champion Division regular season and conference tournament champion Conference tournament champion

=== Tony Branch years ===
Tony Branch (1988–1990), an assistant coach under Tom Abatemarco was named head coach in 1988. After two disappointing seasons, he was relieved of his duties at the end of the 1989–1990 season. Although the overall records were disappointing, Branch's teams had out of conference wins over Tulsa, Texas A&M, and Rice.

Record table
Tony Branch – Year by Year Record
Season	Team	Overall	Conference	Standing	Postseason
Lamar Cardinals (American South Conference) (1988–1990)
1988–1989	Lamar	12–16	3–7	6th	
1989–1990	Lamar	7–21	1–9	6th	
Lamar:		19–37 (.339)	4–16		
Total:		19–37 (.339)			
National champion Postseason invitational champion Conference regular season champion Conference regular season and conference tournament champion Division regular season champion Division regular season and conference tournament champion Conference tournament champion

=== Mike Newell years ===
Mike Newell (1990–1993) was hired in 1990. He came to Lamar after serving as head coach at University of Arkansas at Little Rock for six seasons taking the UALR Trojans to post-season play five consecutive seasons. The Cardinals moved from the American South Conference to the Sun Belt Conference in Coach Newell's second season with the Cardinals. His overall record at Lamar was 42–44 (20–26 conference).

Record table
Mike Newell – Year by Year Record
Season	Team	Overall	Conference	Standing	Postseason
Lamar Cardinals (American South Conference) (1990–1991)
1990–1991	Lamar	15–13	4–8	5th	
Lamar Cardinals (Sun Belt Conference) (1991–1993)
1991–1992	Lamar	12–19	7–9	8th	
1992–1993	Lamar	15–12	9–9	9th T	
Lamar:		42–44 (.488)	20–26		
Total:		175–104 (.627)			
National champion Postseason invitational champion Conference regular season champion Conference regular season and conference tournament champion Division regular season champion Division regular season and conference tournament champion Conference tournament champion

=== Grey Giovanine years ===
Grey Giovanine (1993–1999), an assistant coach at Wichita State, was hired to replace Mike Newell. The Cardinals competed as members of the Sun Belt Conference his first five seasons at Lamar before returning to the Southland Conference in his final season with the Cardinals. His overall record with the Cardinals was 80–85 (47–61 Conference). Out of conference highlights of his years at Lamar were wins over Baylor and LSU.

Record table
Grey Giovanine Year by Year Record
Season	Team	Overall	Conference	Standing	Postseason
Lamar Cardinals (Sun Belt Conference) (1993–1998)
1993–1994	Lamar	10–17	6–12	8th T	
1994–1995	Lamar	11–16	6–12	8th	
1995–1996	Lamar	12–15	7–11	6th T	
1996–1997	Lamar	15–12	10–8	4th T	
1997–1998	Lamar	15–14	7–11	7th	
Lamar Cardinals (Southland Conference) (1998–1999)
1998–1999	Lamar	15–14	7–11	7th	
Lamar:		80–85 (.485)	47–61		
Total:		80–85 (.485)			
National champion Postseason invitational champion Conference regular season champion Conference regular season and conference tournament champion Division regular season champion Division regular season and conference tournament champion Conference tournament champion

=== Mike Deane years ===
Mike Deane (1999–2003) was hired in 1999. In his first year, he returned the Cardinals to the NCAA tournament for the first time since the Pat Foster era. The Cardinals played Duke in the first round of the 2000 NCAA tournament.

Record table
Mike Deane – Year by Year Record
Season	Team	Overall	Conference	Standing	Postseason
Lamar Cardinals (Southland Conference) (1999–2003)
1999–2000	Lamar	15–16	8–10	T6th	NCAA (1st Round)
2000–2001	Lamar	9–18	7–13	9th	
2001–2002	Lamar	15–14	11–9	4th	
2001–2002	Lamar	13–14	10–10	T5th	
Lamar:		53–63 (.457)	36–42		
Total:		437–332 (.568)			
National champion Postseason invitational champion Conference regular season champion Conference regular season and conference tournament champion Division regular season champion Division regular season and conference tournament champion Conference tournament champion

=== Billy Tubbs return ===
Billy Tubbs (2003–2006) returned to Lamar University in 2002 as Athletics Director. In addition to Athletics Director, Tubbs returned as the Cardinals basketball team head coach in 2003 following Mike Deane's reassignment. Tubbs' return was highly anticipated and increased attendance. He turned the program around from 10th place in 2003 to tied for 4th in 2006. In 2006 Coach Tubbs stepped down as head basketball coach to concentrate on the athletic director position. He was succeeded by assistant and Lamar Alumnus Steve Roccaforte.

Record table
Billy Tubbs (2nd time) – Year by Year Record
Season	Team	Overall	Conference	Standing	Postseason
Lamar Cardinals (Southland Conference) (2003–2006)
2003–2004	Lamar	11–18	5–11	10th	
2004–2005	Lamar	18–11	9–7	5th	
2005–2006	Lamar	17–14	9–7	T-4th	
Lamar:		46–43 (.517)	23–25		
Total:		640–340 (.653)			
National champion Postseason invitational champion Conference regular season champion Conference regular season and conference tournament champion Division regular season champion Division regular season and conference tournament champion Conference tournament champion

=== Steve Roccaforte years ===
During the Roccaforte era (2006–2011), Lamar Basketball Lamar had erratic success. The Cardinals had wins over major programs like the Texas Tech Red Raiders in 2008. Coach Roc took the Cardinals to the East Division Championship and a 19 win season in 2007–2008. Following the SLC championship the Cardinals failed to reach the conference tournament for the next three seasons.

Coach Roc's tenure at Lamar was marked by some successes and very highly ranked recruiting classes. As proof of coach Roccaforte's eye for talent, Mike James a coach Roccaforte recruit, scored 52 points in 28 minutes in a 114–62 win over Louisiana College. James's performance was the top single-game scoring performance of the 2011 NCAA basketball season.

Record table
Steve Roccaforte – Year by Year Record
Season	Team	Overall	Conference	Standing	Postseason
Lamar Cardinals (Southland) (2006–2011)
2006–2007	Lamar	15–17	8–8	3rdEastT	
2007–2008	Lamar	19–11	8–2	1st T, Division championship (East)	
2008–2009	Lamar	15–15	6–10	9th	
2009–2010	Lamar	14–18	5–11	9th T	
2010–2011	Lamar	13–17	7–9	9th T	
Lamar:		76–78 (.494)	39–41		
Total:		76–78 (.494)			
National champion Postseason invitational champion Conference regular season champion Conference regular season and conference tournament champion Division regular season champion Division regular season and conference tournament champion Conference tournament champion

=== Pat Knight years ===
On April 5, 2011, Lamar University announced the hiring of Pat Knight, as its new head men's basketball coach. In Knight's first season with the Cardinals he took them to their first 20 win season since Tom Abatemarco's 1988 squad finished 20–11. The 2011–2012 squad finished with a 20–11 regular season record and an 11–5 Southland Conference record, finishing in 3rd place. In the last game of the regular season, Lamar won at home over arch-rival McNeese State. The head-to-head matchup clinched Lamar the Southland Conference East Division Championship. Lamar would go on to win the Southland Conference Championship and earn their first NCAA appearance since 2000. In the midst of the two worst seasons in Lamar's history and a 3–22 season during his third year at the helm, Pat Knight was relieved of his duties on February 16, 2014.

Record table
Pat Knight – Year by Year Record
Season	Team	Overall	Conference	Standing	Postseason
Lamar Cardinals (Southland Conference) (2011–2014)
2011–2012	Lamar	23–12	11–5	3rd Overall (1st East Division)	NCAA First Four
2012–2013	Lamar	3–28	1–17	10th	
2013–2014	Lamar	3–22	2–11	12th	
Lamar:		29–62 (.319)	15–37		
Total:		79–123 (.391)			
National champion Postseason invitational champion Conference regular season champion Conference regular season and conference tournament champion Division regular season champion Division regular season and conference tournament champion Conference tournament champion

=== Tic Price years ===
On February 16, 2014, Lamar University announced that Tic Price would be interim head men's basketball coach. The Cardinals closed out the 2013–2014 with 1 win and 4 losses under Coach Price. On March 18, 2014, Tic Price was named the Cardinals eleventh head basketball coach.

In Tic Price's first full season as head coach of the Cardinals men's basketball team, the Cardinals had the 11th best turnaround in NCAA Division I men's basketball . The Cardinals improved from a record of 4–26 for the previous season to 15–15 record at the conclusion of the 2014–15 season.

Record table
Season	Team	Overall	Conference	Standing	Postseason
Lamar Cardinals (Southland Conference) (2014–2021)
2013–14	Lamar	1–4	1–4		
2014–15	Lamar	15–15	9–9	6th	
2015–16	Lamar	11–19	3–15	13th	
2016–17	Lamar	19–15	10–8	T–5th	CIT first round
2017–18	Lamar	19–14	11–7	T–5th	CIT first round
2018–19	Lamar	20–13	12–6	T–3rd	
2019–20	Lamar	17–15	10–10	T–6th	
2020–21	Lamar	10–18	6–10	7th	
Lamar:		112–113 (.498)	62–69 (.473)		
Lamar Cardinals (Western Athletic Conference) (2021–future)
2021–22	Lamar	–	–		
Total:		279–235 (.543)			
National champion Postseason invitational champion Conference regular season champion Conference regular season and conference tournament champion Division regular season champion Division regular season and conference tournament champion Conference tournament champion

(Won/loss record reflects results of games through the 2020–21 season.)

== Coaches ==
The Cardinals have had 12 coaches since becoming a senior college (4-year institution) in 1951. Jack Martin was the first coach. Alvin Brooks is the current coach. Three Cardinal coaches have been named Southland Conference Coach of the Year:Jack Martin in 1969 and 1970, Billy Tubbs in 1978 and 1980, and Pat Foster in 1984. Steve Roccaforte shared CollegeInsider.com Southland Conference Coach of the Year honors in 2008. Five Cardinal coaches have taken their teams to NCAA tournaments: Jack Martin in 1960, 1962, 1963, 1964 (NCAA Division II); Billy Tubbs in 1979 and 1980; Pat Foster in 1981 and 1983; Mike Deane in 2000; and Pat Knight in 2012.

== Postseason ==
=== NCAA Division I Tournament results ===
The Cardinals have appeared in six NCAA Division I Tournaments, all as Lamar University. Their combined record is 5–6.

Year	Seed	Round	Opponent	Result
1979	#10	First round Second Round	#7 Detroit #2 Michigan State	W 95–87; L 64–95
1980	#10	First round Second Round; Sweet Sixteen	#7 Weber State #2 Oregon State #6 Clemson	W 87–86; W 81–77; L 66–74
1981	#8	First round Second Round	#9 Missouri #1 LSU	W 71–67; L 78–100
1983	#11	First round Second Round	#6 Alabama #3 Villanova	W 73–50; L 58–60
2000	#16	First round	#1 Duke	L 55–82
2012	#16	First Four	#16 Vermont	L 59–71

=== NCAA Division II Tournament results ===
The Cardinals have appeared in five NCAA Division II Tournaments as Lamar State College of Technology. Their combined record is 5–5.

Year	Round	Opponent	Result
1960	Regional semifinals Regional 3rd-place game	Northeast Missouri; Colorado College	L 81–82; W 88–67
1962	Regional semifinals Regional 3rd-place game	Arkansas State; Abilene Christian	L 65–66; W 83–74
1963	Regional semifinals Regional Finals	Arkansas State; Southern Illinois	W 89–88; L 84–93
1964	Regional semifinals Regional 3rd-place game	Abilene Christian; Colorado State College	L 71–73; W 116–85
1966	Regional semifinals Regional 3rd-place game	Evansville; Indiana State	L 103–111; W 93–78

=== NIT results ===
The Cardinals have appeared in four National Invitation Tournaments (NIT). Their combined record is 2–4.

Year	Round	Opponent	Result
1982	First round	Texas A&M	L 58–60
1984	First round Second Round	New Mexico; Santa Clara	W 64–61; L 74–76
1985	First round Second Round	Houston; UT Chattanooga	W 78–71; L 84–85
1986	First round	George Mason	L 63–65

=== CIT results ===
The Cardinals have appeared in the CollegeInsider.com Postseason Tournament (CIT) two times. Their combined record is 0–2.

Year	Round	Opponent	Result
2017	First round	Texas State	L 60–70
2018	First round	UTSA	L 69–76

== Miscellaneous history ==
=== 80-game home win streak ===
From 1978 to 1984 Lamar had one of the longest home court win streaks in NCAA history. The Cardinals compiled 80 wins between February 18, 1978, and March 10, 1984. The streak began February 18, 1978 against Arkansas State as the Cardinals cruised to a 59–54 victory. On March 10, 1984, as Lamar was hosting the Southland Conference tournament, Louisiana Tech came to town with future Hall of Famer Karl Malone. The Bulldogs would win 68–65 and advance to the NCAA tournament. McDonald Gym (37 games) and the Beaumont Civic Center (43 games) were Lamar's home-court during the win streak. Currently the win streak is 7th all time in NCAA division I history.

== Attendance ==
=== Top 10 attendance marks ===
Below is a list of the Cardinals 10 best-attended games men's* home games (all at the Montagne Center).

Rk.	Date	Opponent	Attendance
Top 10 Attendance
1	January 10, 1987	McNeese State	10,010
2	February 27, 1986	McNeese State	9,467
3	December 16, 1985	LSU	9,432
4	January 24, 1987	Arkansas State	8,992
5	March 15, 1985	Houston	8,610
6	December 27, 1995	Texas	8,454
7	February 23, 2008	Northwestern St.	8,338
8	January 26, 1985	Louisiana Tech	8,317
9	March 20, 1985	Chattanooga	8,245
10	November 26, 1985	Villanova	8,216

As of the 2018–19 season.
*Note: Record home attendance for a Lady Cardinals game at the Montagne Center 9,143 was on March 17, 1991, vs the LSU Lady Tigers.

=== Yearly attendance ===
Below is a list of the attendance by year since the Cardinals moved into the Montagne Center.

Season	Average	High
Yearly Attendance
2021–22	2,221	3,532
2020–21	1,282	2,359*
2019–20	2,256	4,254
2018–19	2,355	5,218
2017–18	1,560	2,196
2016–17	1,890	2,774
2015–16	1,776	2,312
2014–15	2,173	3,543
2013–14	2,170	3,984
2012–13	2,664	6,059
2011–12	2,834	5,138
2010–11	3,176	5,083
2009–10	2,970	4,675
2008–09	3,673	6,182
2007–08	3,704	8,338
2006–07	3,579	7,497
2005–06	3,269	5,173
2004–05	3,986	6,164
2003–04	4,063	5,347
2002–03	3,338	4,537
2001–02	2,670	4,147
2000–01	2,768	5,033
1999–2000	3,704	6,271
1998–99	3,382	6,193
1997–98	4,442	7,584
1996–97	2,638	5,089
1995–96	2,822	8,454
1994–95	2,294	4,142
1993–94	2,987	3,876
1992–93	3,861	8,033
1991–92	3,602	5,642
1990–91	5,437	7,641
1989–90	1,629	2,932
1988–89	4,562	6,615
1987–88	4,562	7,504
1986–87	6,615	10,010
1985–86	6,326	9,467
1984–85	6,306	8,310

* Fall 2020 attendance limited to 25% capacity due to COVID19 precautions.
As of the 2021–22 season.

== Awards and honors ==
=== Retired jerseys ===
Below is a list of retired Cardinals jerseys.

Retired Jerseys
No.	Year Retired	Name	Years
13	2009	Don Bryson	1962–1965
52	2009	B. B. Davis	1977–1981
54	2009	Clarence Kea	1976–1980
54	2019	James Gulley	1984–1988

=== National and regional awards and honors ===
==== All-Americans ====
- Don Bryson – AP All-American (College Division), 3rd Team, 1965
- Earl Dow – AP All-American (Division I), 2nd Team, 1969
- Mike Olliver – Citizens Savings Foundation All-American (Division I), 1st Team, 1981
- Matt Sundbald – Verizon/CoSIDA Academic All-American, 3rd Team, 1998, 1st Team, 1999

==== Academic Athlete of the Year ====
- Matt Sundblad, Verizon/CoSIDA Men's Basketball Academic Athlete of the Year, 1999

==== All-Star games ====
- Earl Dow, East-West All-Star Game, 1969
- Tom Sewell, NABC All-Star Game, 1984

==== USBWA All-District VI Team ====
- B B Davis, 1980, 81
- Mike Olliver, 1981 (Co-Player of the Year)
- Tom Sewell, 1984
- Alan Daniels, 2006
- Kenny Dawkins, 2nd Team, 2009
- Jay Brown, 2nd Team, 2009

=== Southland Conference honors ===
==== Player of the Year ====
- Kenny Haynes, 1970
- Luke Adams, 1971
- Mike Olliver, 1981
- Tom Sewell, 1984

==== Newcomer of the Year ====
- B. B. Davis, 1978
- Jerry Everett, 1984
- James Gulley, 1985
- Lamar Sanders, 2007
- Kenny Dawkins, 2008
- Tyran de Lattibeaudiere, 2015

==== Coach of the Year ====
- Jack Martin, 1969, 70
- Billy Tubbs, 1978, 80
- Pat Foster, 1984

==== First Team All-Conference ====
- Luke Adams, 1970, 71
- Ron Austin, 2003
- Don Bryson, 1965
- Alan Daniels, 2005, 06
- Kenny Dawkins, 2008
- B. B. Davis, 1978, 79, 81
- Earl Dow, 1968, 69
- Jerry Everett, 1985
- Nick Garth, 2019
- James Gulley, 1987
- Don Heller, 1964
- Mike James, 2012
- Henry Jones, 1976
- Clarence Kea, 1980
- Jim Nicholson, 1968
- Alfred Nicholson, 1974
- Mike Olliver, 1979, 80, 81
- Lamont Robinson, 1984
- Lamar Sanders, 2008
- Tom Sewell, 1983, 84
- Anthony Todd, 1986
- Jerry Wade, 1965
- Colton Weisbrod, 2017, 18

==== Most Valuable Player ====
- Kenny Haynes, 1970
- Luke Adams, 1971
- Mike Olliver, 1981
- Tom Sewell, 1984

==== Tournament Most Valuable Player ====
- Mike Olliver, 1981
- Lamont Robinson, 1983
- Jerry Everett, 1985
- Landon Rowe, 2000
- Mike James, 2012

==== All-decade teams ====
===== 1960s =====
- Don Bryson, Earl Dow
- Co-Coach of the Decade – Jack Martin

===== 1970s =====
- Luke Adams, Clarence Kea
- Coach of the Decade – Billy Tubbs

===== 1980s =====
- B. B. Davis, Anthony Todd, Jerry Everett, James Gulley, Mike Olliver, Kenneth Perkins, Lamont Robinson, Tom Sewell
- Coach of the Decade – Pat Foster

===== 2000s =====
- Alan Daniels, Larry Sanders

=== American South Conference honors ===
==== All Conference teams ====
- James Gulley & Adrian Caldwell, 1989

=== Sun Belt Conference honors ===
==== All Conference teams ====
- Atiim Browne, 1994
- Ron Coleman, 1995, 97
- Lucas Wagler, 1996

==== Freshman of the Year ====
- Keith Veney, 1993

== Cardinals in the NBA ==
Lamar University has had four players who played in the NBA and ten players who were picked in the NBA draft. The players are listed below.

=== Played in the NBA ===
- Adrian Caldwell 1989–1997 (Undrafted) Played in 197 NBA games for the Houston Rockets, Indiana Pacers, Philadelphia 76ers, New Jersey Nets, and the Dallas Mavericks
- Clarence Kea 1980–1982 (Drafted – See below) Played for the Dallas Mavericks
- Tom Sewell 1984 (Drafted – See below) Played for the Washington Bullets
- Mike James 2017–2018 (Undrafted) Played for the Phoenix Suns and New Orleans Pelicans.

=== Drafted players ===
- Luke Adams, 1971 – Los Angeles Lakers Round 8, Pick 13
- Greg Anderson, 1986 – Dallas Mavericks Round 6, Pick 15
- Alvin Brooks, 1989 – San Antonio Spurs Round 10, Pick 17
- B. B. Davis, 1981 – Kansas City Kings Round 4, Pick 13
- Jerry Everett, 1985 – Phoenix Suns Round 3, Pick 9
- Clarence Kea, Dallas Mavericks Round 8, 9th Pick
- Terry Long, 1982 – Portland Trail Blazers Round 7, Pick 11
- Mike Olliver, 1981 – Chicago Bulls Round 2, Pick 9 draft rights traded to the Indiana Pacers
- Lamont Robinson, 1984 – Chicago Bulls Round 5, Pick 2
- Tom Sewell, 1984 – Philadelphia 76ers Round 1, 22nd Pick
