= List of Lamar University alumni =

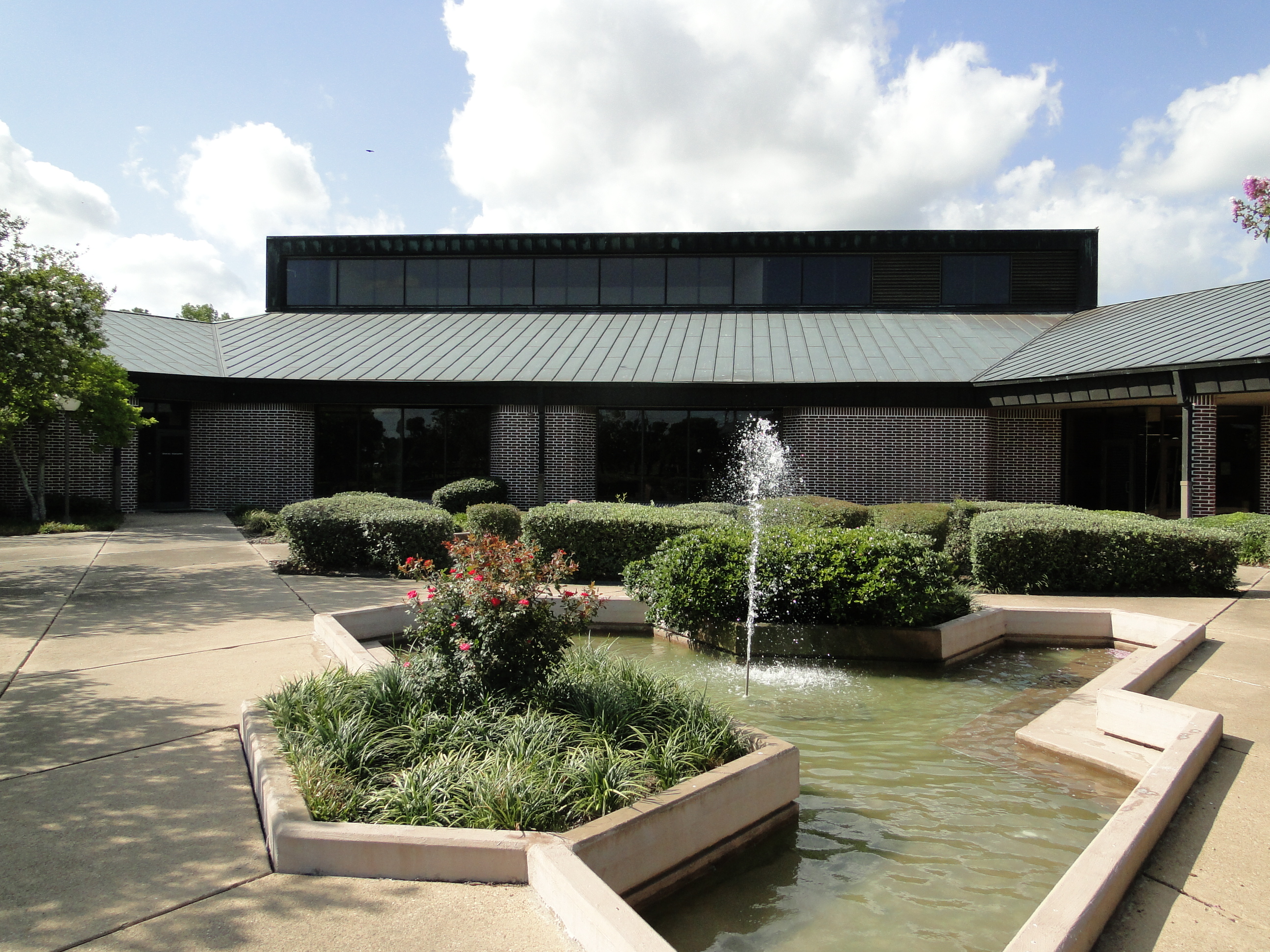
The John Gray Center houses Lamar's alumni affairs office.

The List of Lamar University alumni includes notable former students of Lamar University. The term "Lamar Cardinal," which comes from Lamar's mascot "Big Red," a cardinal, refers to current and former students of Lamar University. The class year of each former student indicates the year four years after their enrollment year, and does not necessarily represent graduation year.

Lamar University was previously known as Lamar College and Lamar State College of Technology (Lamar Tech); this list includes students who graduated when Lamar held different names than the one it holds today.

== Academia ==
- John E. Gray – prominent banker and president of Lamar University
- John Hirasaki – NASA engineer who quarantined with Apollo 11 astronauts after their return from the moon
- Hershel Parker – H. Fletcher Brown Professor Emeritus at the University of Delaware

== Athletes and coaches ==
=== Baseball ===
- Beau Allred – retired Major League Baseball outfielder
- Bruce Aven – retired Major League Baseball player
- Phil Brassington – retired Australian right-handed pitcher
- Eric Cammack – retired relief pitcher in Major League Baseball
- Jerald Clark – retired Major League Baseball outfielder
- Jonathan Dziedzic – pitcher in the Kansas City Royals organization
- Jim Gilligan – one of the NCAA's most winning baseball coaches
- Clay Hensley – retired MLB pitcher
- Micah Hoffpauir – retired MLB player
- Tony Mack – retired professional baseball player
- Kevin Millar – MLB World Champion, Boston Red Sox
- Brian Sanches – retired MLB pitcher
- Mike Sarbaugh – retired minor league baseball player and minor league manager
- Dave Smith – retired professional baseball pitcher
- Stijn van der Meer – infielder in the Houston Astros organization and a member of the Netherlands national baseball team in the 2017 World Baseball Classic
- Randy Williams – retired professional baseball pitcher

=== Basketball ===
- Nicole Aiken-Pinnock – Jamaican netball player
- Alvin Brooks – associate coach and former head coach of the University of Houston's men's basketball team
- Adrian Caldwell – retired professional basketball player
- B. B. Davis – retired basketball player
- James Gulley (born 1965) – former professional basketball player for Ironi Ramat Gan in the Israeli Basketball Premier League
- Clarence Kea – retired professional basketball player
- Steve Roccaforte – assistant coach at the University of South Florida
- Tom Sewell – retired professional basketball player
- Billy Tubbs – retired men's college basketball coach
- Keith Veney – retired professional basketball player

=== Football ===
- Reggie Begelton – wide receiver for the Green Bay Packers
- Otho Davis – first athletic trainer nominated for induction into the Pro Football Hall of Fame; Athletic Trainer for the Philadelphia Eagles
- Johnny Fuller – retired NFL player
- Bobby Jancik – former player in the AFL
- Dudley Meredith – former defensive end in the AFL
- Wayne Moore – retired NFL player
- Tracey Perkins – former defensive back in the Arena Football League
- Bum Phillips – head coach and general manager of the Houston Oilers
- Colin Ridgeway – former NFL player, first Australian to play in the NFL; competed in the high jump at the 1956 Summer Olympics
- Eugene Seale – former NFL player

=== Golf ===
- Ronnie Black – PGA Tour professional golfer
- Dawn Coe-Jones – Canadian LPGA golfer
- Clifford Ann Creed – retired LPGA golfer
- Trevor Dodds – Namibian professional golfer
- Gail Graham – Canadian LPGA golfer
- Justin Harding – PGA Tour professional golfer
- Susie McAllister – LPGA golfer
- John Riegger – PGA Tour professional golfer
- Chris Stroud – PGA Tour professional golfer
- Jen Wyatt – Canadian LPGA golfer

=== Tennis ===
- Sherwood Stewart – retired professional tennis player

=== Track and field ===
- Thomas Eriksson – retired high jumper from Sweden
- Midde Hamrin – Olympian marathon runner

== Arts ==
=== Film ===
- Kelly Asbury – film director, screenwriter, voice actor, children's book author/illustrator, and non-fiction author
- G. W. Bailey – stage, television and film actor
- Phyllis Davis – actress

=== Music ===
- Janis Joplin – former singer-songwriter
- Joshua Ledet – American Idol Season 11 Top 3 contestant
- Bob McDill – singer-songwriter
- Jiles Perry Richardson – former musician and songwriter known as "The Big Bopper"

=== Visual art ===
- John Alexander – painter
- Keith Carter – photographer
- Matchett Herring Coe – former sculptor
- Marvin Hayes – painter and illustrator
- Jerry Wilkerson – former artist known for his contemporary pointillistic style of painting

=== Writers ===
- H. Palmer Hall – former poet, fiction writer, essayist, editor, and librarian

== Business ==
- Randy Best – founder of Academic Partnerships
- Angela Blanchard – president and CEO of BakerRipley
- Claude H. Nash – CEO of Bloodstone Ventures; researcher

== Media ==
- Bill Macatee – sports broadcaster

== Military ==
- Harry Brinkley Bass – former U.S. Navy pilot who was twice awarded the Navy Cross for his heroic actions in the Pacific theater during World War II

== Politics ==
- Brian Birdwell (B.S., criminal justice, 1984) – member of the Texas State Senate and survivor of the Pentagon attack of September 11, 2001
- Jack Brooks – former member of the U.S. House of Representatives, served for forty-two years in the House
- Charles Holcomb – Texas Appeals Court judge
- Nick Lampson – politician, served in the U.S. House of Representatives from two Texas districts
- Robert Nichols – Republican senator for the 3rd District in the Texas Senate
- Elvin Santos – former vice president of Honduras
- Wayne Shaw – Oklahoma state senator
- Karen Silkwood – former chemical technician and labor union activist
