= Lamar Cardinals and Lady Cardinals =

Texas college athletics team

- University: Lamar University
- NCAA: Division I – FCS
- Conference: Southland
- Athletic director: Jeff O'Malley
- Location: Beaumont, Texas
- Varsity teams: 17 (8 men's, 9 women's)
- Football stadium: Provost Umphrey Stadium
- Basketball arena: Montagne Center
- Baseball stadium: Vincent-Beck Stadium
- Softball stadium: Lamar Softball Complex
- Soccer stadium: Lamar Soccer Complex
- Other venues: McDonald Gym; Thompson Family Tennis Center; Ty Terrell Track Complex
- Nickname: Cardinals
- Colors: Red and white
- Mascot: Big Red
- Fight song: Lamar Fight song
- Website: lamarcardinals.com

The Lamar Cardinals and Lady Cardinals (variously Cardinals or Cards) refers to the college athletics teams of Lamar University, in Beaumont, Texas. The Cardinals and Lady Cardinals teams compete in seventeen NCAA Division I sports as a member of the Southland Conference. The Cardinals rejoined the Southland after spending the 2021–22 athletic year in the Western Athletic Conference (WAC).

== General history ==
The school has participated in practically every level of collegiate athletics from its inception as a junior college in 1923 to its realization as a university in 1971. The newest teams are the reinstated football team, which returned in 2010 and Women's softball, which returned in the 2013 season. The adoption of the nickname "Cardinals" dates back to the school's name change to Lamar in 1932.

Athletics at Lamar University began when the school opened as South Park Junior College in September 1923. Initially the school was using the name "Brahmas" as its mascot. When the school changed its name in 1932 to reflect that it served a much wider area than just South Park, a contest was held to determine the school's name. When Lamar was finally chosen, John Gray—head coach and athletic director at the time—dropped the old athletic nickname "Brahmas" and chose a new name, "Cardinals."

When Lamar became a four-year college in 1951, it entered the highly competitive Lone Star Conference Lamar moved to NCAA College Division (Now NCAA D-II) in 1963 along with the newly formed Southland Conference. In 1973, the university and Southland Conference moved to NCAA University Division (Now NCAA D-I). Lamar has competed at the NCAA Division I level since that time.

When the NCAA Division I split, the Southland Conference competed at the NCAA Division I-A (now FBS) level from 1978 to 1981. Lamar and the remainder of the Southland Conference moved to NCAA Division I-AA (FCS) in 1982.

On January 14, 2021, Lamar was one of five institutions announced as future members of the Western Athletic Conference (WAC), alongside three other Southland members from Texas (Abilene Christian, Sam Houston, Stephen F. Austin) plus Big Sky Conference member Southern Utah. Initially, all five schools were to join in July 2022, but the entry of Lamar and the other Texas schools was moved to 2021 after the Southland expelled its departing members.

The university has been a member of several conferences, including:

Conference History:

- Lone Star Conference 1951–52 to 1962–63
- Southland Conference 1963–64 to 1985–86; rejoined 1999–2000 to 2020–21; 2022–present
- American South Conference (football Independent) 1986–87 to 1990–91
- Sun Belt Conference (The larger American South Conference merged with the Sun Belt retaining the Sun Belt name.) 1991–92 to 1997–98
- NCAA Division I Independent 1998–99
- Western Athletic Conference, from 2021 to 2022

== Sports sponsored ==
Men's sports	Women's sports
Baseball	Basketball
Basketball	Cross country
Cross country	Golf
Football	Soccer
Golf	Softball
Tennis	Tennis
Track and field^{†}	Track and field^{†}
	Volleyball
† – Track and field includes both indoor and outdoor

=== Men's sports ===
==== Baseball ====
The Cardinals baseball team has been coached by Coach Will Davis since 2017. He replaced Jim Gilligan who retired after the 2016 season. Gilligan coached the Cardinals for 39 years. With over 1000 career wins as a head coach he is one of the most winning coaches in NCAA history. Over ten LU players have moved on to play in the MLB, such as Kevin Millar and Brian Sanches. According to Baseball America.com, 83 Lamar Cardinals have been selected in the Major League Baseball draft as of the 2016 draft. Eleven drafted players played on a Major League Baseball team during their career. A total of six players have been selected in the first three rounds of the draft; two players in each of the first three.

The Cardinals baseball team has appeared in 13 NCAA Division I tournaments. The most recent appearance was in 2010. The Cardinals lead the Southland Conference with 10 regular season titles. The team won one regular season title in the Sun Belt Conference. Additionally, the team has won five conference tournaments. Two conference tournament titles were in the Sun Belt Conference (1993, 1995), and three conference tournament titles were in the Southland Conference (2002, 2004, 2010).

In the 2010 season the Lamar Cardinals Baseball team, seeded 7th in the SLC at the beginning of the conference tournament, went undefeated through the tournament and were crowned the 2010 SLC conference champions. The team received an NCAA tournament bid, playing TCU and Baylor.

Home games have been played at 3,500-seat Vincent-Beck Stadium since 1969. The stadium was also host to minor league baseball Double A Texas League pro team Beaumont Golden Gators as well as semi-pro Texas-Louisiana League Beaumont Bullfrogs.

==== Men's basketball ====
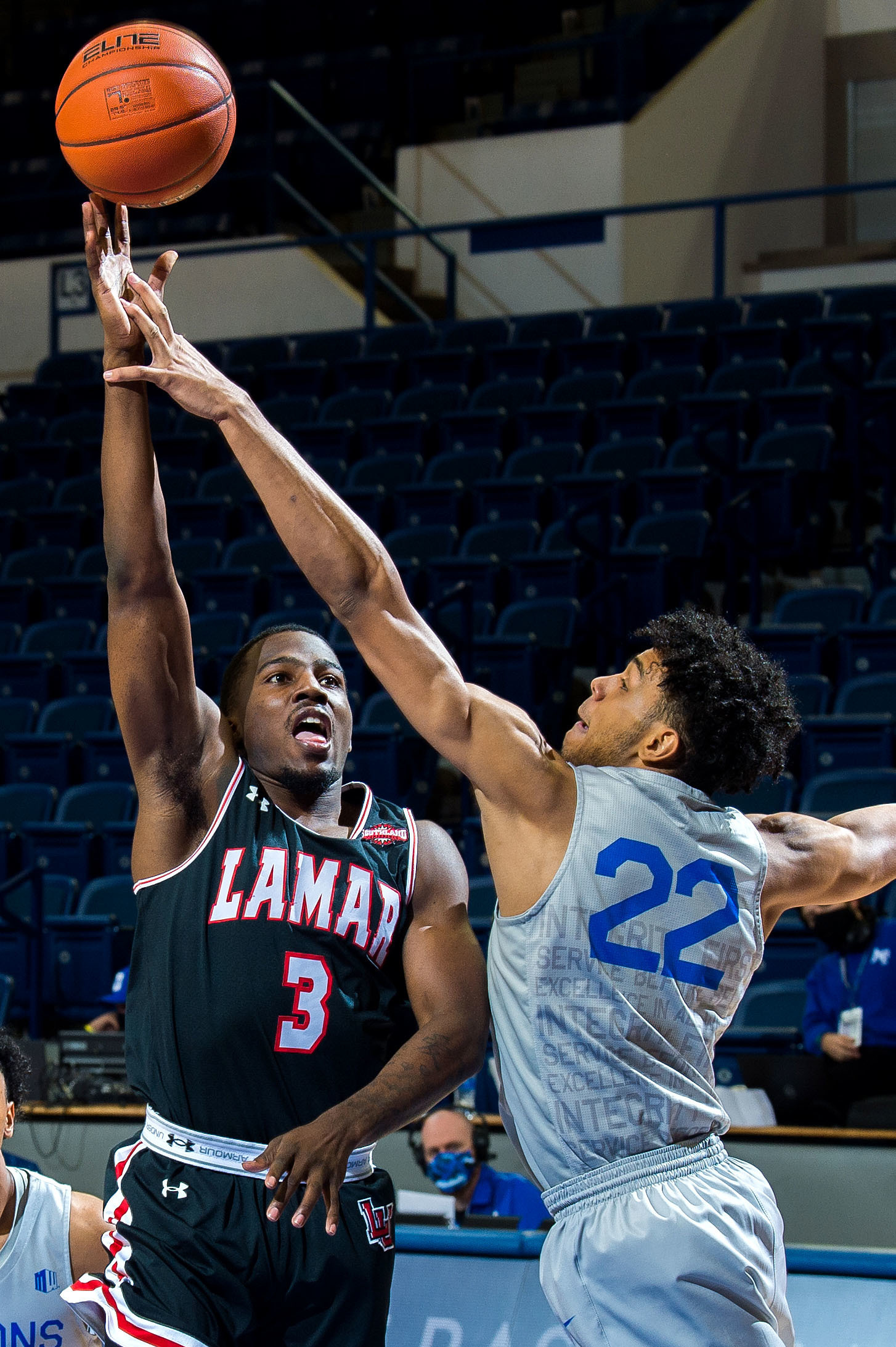
A Cardinals basketball game against Air Force in 2020

The basketball team plays in the 10,080-seat Montagne Center.

Jack Martin (1951–1976) led the Cardinals from NAIA to NCAA Division II to NCAA Division I. He also led the Cardinals in the Lone Star Conference as well as the Southland Conference. The Cardinals won or shared three Lone Star Conference championships (1960–1961, 1961–1962, and 1962–1963) and two Southland Conference championships (1963–1964, 1969–1970) and also won 20 or more games in three seasons under Coach Martin (1961–1962, 1962–1963, and 1968–1969).

The Cardinals under Coach Billy Tubbs (1976–1980) had a Cinderella story NCAA tournament, advancing to the Sweet 16. During Tubbs's reign at Lamar he recruited 2 players, Clarence Kea and B.B. Davis, who would become all-Americans for Lamar, while Clarence would go on to play professionally in the NBA. The 1979 Cardinal Basketball team set records when it beat Portland State University 141–84; at the time, that game set an NCAA record for points in a single game. During the game, Mike Olliver set the single game scoring record at Lamar with 50 points; that record stood until January 4, 2011, when reserve guard Mike James scored 52 points in 28 minutes in a 114–62 win over Division III Louisiana College. As of January 5, 2011, James's performance is the top single-game scoring performance of the NCAA basketball season.

Pat Foster (1980–1986) continued the team's success by leading the Cardinals to three Southland Conference titles, two NCAA tournament appearances and four NIT appearances.

Following Pat Foster, there was a period of several short-term head coaches, including Tom Abatemarco (1986–1988), Tony Branch (1988–1990), and Mike Newell (1990–1993). During the period the Cardinals changed conferences three times moving from the Southland Conference to the newly formed American South Conference and then to the Sun Belt Conference. The best season during the period was a 20–11 overall record under Tom Abatemarco in the 1987–1988 season.

Grey Giovanine (1993–1999) was hired in 1993. The Cardinals completed the conference cycle moving from the Sun Belt Conference back to the Southland Conference in his last season with the Cardinals.

Mike Deane (1999–2003) was hired in 1999. In his first year, he returned the Cardinals to the NCAA tournament for the first time since the Pat Foster era. The Cardinals played Duke in the first round of the 2000 NCAA tournament.

Billy Tubbs (2003–2006) returned to Lamar University in 2002 as Athletics Director. In addition to Athletics Director, Tubbs returned as the Cardinals basketball team head coach in 2003 following Mike Deane's reassignment. Tubbs' return was highly anticipated and increased attendance. He turned the program around from 10th place in 2003 to tied for 4th in 2006. In 2006 Coach Tubbs stepped down as head basketball coach to concentrate on the athletic director position. He was succeeded by assistant and Lamar Alumnus Steve Roccaforte.

In the Roccaforte era (2006–2011) of Lamar Basketball Lamar had erratic success. The Cardinals under Roccaforte had wins over major programs like the Texas Tech Red Raiders in 2008. Coach Roc took the Cardinals to the East Division Championship and a 19-win season in 2007–2008. Following the SLC championship the Cardinals failed to reach the conference tournament for the next three seasons. Coach Roc's time at Lamar has been marked by some successes and very highly ranked recruiting classes. Coach Roc was relieved of duties after the 2010–2011 season.

Pat Knight (2011–2014) was hired on April 5, 2011, as head coach. He previously served as head coach at Texas Tech University from 2008 to 2011. In his first year as Lamar head coach, Coach Knight led the Cardinals to the NCAA tournament and the first 20+ win season since 1988. The Cardinals played Vermont in the 2012 NCAA tournament After failing to win more than three games each of the next two seasons, Coach Knight was relieved of his duties in February 2014.

Tic Price (2014–2021) served as interim head coach for the remainder of the 2013–2014 season. He was named head coach on March 18, 2014. Price coached through the 2020–21 season.

Alvin Brooks (2021–present) was named head coach on April 1, 2021.

==== Men's cross country ====
Men's cross country holds 17 Southland Conference titles and two American South Conference titles as of 2019. The team won six of those titles consecutively from 2006 to 2011. Men's cross country also won five consecutive conference titles from 2013 to 2017.

===== USTFCCCA All-Americans =====
- 1969 – Gerry Garcia (23rd)
- 2006 – Francis Kasagule (29th) 10K
- 2007 – Francis Kasagule (24th) 10K
- 2008 – Samuel Kosgei (37th) 10K
- 2012 – Matt Johnsen (33rd) 10K

==== Football ====
===== 1923–1989 =====
Football began in 1923 when the university was known as South Park Junior College. It was discontinued in 1928 because of a lack of common opponents but was revived again in 1932 by the renamed Lamar College. The program was suspended during World War II again in 1942 and was restored in 1946 and the first football scholarships were offered.

After the school moved up to the NAIA level in the Lone Star Conference, the Cardinals didn't have a winning season until a superb 8–0–2 season in 1957 ignited a string of 11 consecutive winning campaigns. Home games during the Lone Star Conference years were at South Park High School's Greenie Stadium, an 8,500-seat stadium at the original site of Lamar's predecessor, South Park Junior College.

Just as the Cardinals were becoming a perennial contender in the Lone Star loop, school officials moved the athletic program forward into the National Collegiate Athletic Association (NCAA) college division ranks in 1963 via the Southland Conference.

Football went independent when Lamar left the SLC in 1987 to join the basketball-flavored American South Conference. Dismal support finally led to larger-than-expected deficits and provided the bottom line fodder for five new appointees to the then-Lamar board of regents to pull the plug on football at their first official session in 1989 (5 to 4 vote).

===== 2010–present =====
After over 20 years with no football program, Lamar restarted the program with first games in 2010. The university hired former NFL player Ray Woodard as the head coach to lead the charge in bringing the Cardinals back to the gridiron. Former basketball coach Billy Tubbs was hired as the athletic director in 2006 and had a significant role in bringing back the Cardinals Football team. Lamar played their first game in over 20 years on September 4, 2010, at rival McNeese State University. The Cardinals lost a close game 27–30 in front of over 19,000 at MSU's Cowboy Stadium. The 2010 Cardinals finished 5–6 with DI wins over Southeastern Louisiana and South Dakota.

===== Stadiums =====
====== South Park High School Greenie Stadium (c. 1923–1963) ======
Home games through the Lone Star Conference years were at South Park High School's Greenie Stadium, an 8,500-seat stadium at the original site of Lamar's predecessor, South Park Junior College. Although Greenie Stadium was off-campus, it was less than one mile from the Lamar's current campus.

====== Cardinal Stadium now named Provost Umphrey Stadium (1964–present) ======
In 1964, one season after joining the Southland Conference, the Cardinals moved to the new on-campus Cardinal Stadium. Cardinal Stadium had an original capacity of 17,500. Capacity remained at 17,500 until renovations and improvements prior to the football program restart in 2010. In preparation for the return of play the university did extensive work on the facilities including, Provost Umphrey Stadium, a new Athletic complex, and high class suites built into the existing Montagne Center.

==== Men's golf ====
The men's golf team has been ranked in the top 10 nationally and has won over 30 conference titles. The team has had many alumni continue on to the PGA Tour including Trevor Dodds, Dawie van der Walt, John Riegger, Chris Stroud and Kelly Gibson. The program between 1953 and 1973 won the conference title every year, an amazing 21 consecutive titles. The team boasts seven national titles; five NAIA national titles (1956–58, 1960–61) and two NCAA College Division titles (1967–68). The Cardinals have won 24 team (1964–73, 1981–83, 1985–87, 2001–03, 2006–09, 2012) and 19 individual Southland Conference Championships surpassing every other Southland schools by at least 20 titles. The most recent championship was in 2012. The Cardinals finished #3 in the nation in the 2007 NCAA Division I standings. The 2007 Lamar Golf team is one of only two Cardinal sports teams to ever finish in the top 10 in NCAA division I athletics.

===== PING All-Americans =====
Sources:

- 1967 – Mike Nugent – Honorable Mention
- 1985 – Trevor Dodds – 1st Team
- 1985 – Philip Jonas – Honorable Mention
- 1985 – John Riegger – Honorable Mention
- 1986 – Philip Jonas – 1st Team
- 2003 – Chris Stroud – 3rd Team
- 2004 – Chris Stroud – 1st Team
- 2005 – Dawie van der Walt – Honorable Mention
- 2006 – Dawie van der Walt – 2nd Team
- 2006 – Dusty Smith – Honorable Mention
- 2007 – Dawie van der Walt – 1st Team
- 2007 – Oliver Bekker – Honorable Mention

==== Men's tennis ====
The tennis team is coached by Scott Shankles who is in his twelfth season at Lamar. Since their first season in 1952, the Cardinals have won numerous team championships at the national, regional, and conference levels over the years. Cardinals have also had success at the Singles and Doubles level including national, regional, and conference championships. The championships are listed in the Conference and National Championships section near the bottom of this article. Additionally, members of Cardinal teams have been selected to the First Team All-Southland Conference Singles team fourteen (19) times and the First Team All-Southland Conference Doubles team eleven (14) times. Other conference honors received by Cardinal players are listed below. The Cardinals were awarded Men's Tennis Player of the Year, Freshman of the Year, and Coach of the Year honors in 2022, Lamar's first year in the Western Athletic Conference.

Southland Conference

Southland Conference Player of the Year

- Jakob Paulsen – 2003
- Filip Kanczula – 2008
- Michael Feucht – 2016

Southland Conference Newcomer of the Year

- Filip Kanczula – 2006

Southland Conference Freshman of the Year

- Jakob Paulsen – 2002
- Benny Scheiwzer – 2015

Southland Conference Coach of the Year

- Ron Westbrooks – 1973, '75, '76, '82
- Scott Shankles – 2016

Western Athletic Conference

Western Athletic Conference Player of the Year

- Daniel Sancho Arbizu – 2022

Western Athletic Conference Freshman of the Year

- Daniel Sancho Arbizu – 2022

Western Athletic Conference Coach of the Year

- Scott Shankles – 2022

==== Men's track & field ====
The Cardinals field teams for both indoor and outdoor Track & Field. The track team trains and host home tournaments at Ty Terrell Track. The track program is coached by Trey Clark. The track & field team was built around distance and sprints running until recently but has expanded the program to include jumps and multis with the hire of Jake Cohen.

Excluding the five All-Americans in Cross Country competition listed separately above, the Cardinals athletes have achieved NCAA All-American status thirty (30) times over the history of the program. In addition, seven All-American designations were in NAIA competition.

=== Women's sports ===
==== Women's basketball ====
In the 1991 NCAA Division I women's basketball tournament, Lamar under coach Al Barbre made a run as a tenth seed in the Austin regional. The 1991 Lady Cardinals defeated Texas, LSU and Arkansas before being defeated by Virginia in the Elite Eight, Virginia went on to lose in the national championship game by 3 points. Following a lull, the team has had significant success in recent seasons (2007–2014). Coach Larry Tidwell turned the team around from a struggling program to a perennial power in the Southland Conference. In 2010 the team won the regular season and conference tournament to advance to the 2010 NCAA tournament. The Lady Cardinals will make their first ever appearance in the preseason WNIT in the fall of 2010. The team plays in the 10,080 seat Montagne Center. In the 2011 season, coach Tidwell's Lady Cardinals received their first top 100 RPI ranking (RPI #80) since the figures were made public in the 2005 season. The 2010–2011 squad finished with a record of 25–8 and made an appearance in the 2011 post season WNIT. The Cardinals continued post season play under Coach Tidwell in 2013 competing in the 2013 Women's Basketball Invitational tournament. Following Larry Tidwell's departure, the Lady Cardinals, under 1st year head coach Robin Harmony, were Southland Conference co-champions in the 2013–2014 season making a return trip to the WNIT competing in the 2014 post season WNIT. The 2014 WNIT tournament appearance added to the recent trend of team appearances in post season play marking the fourth post season appearance in five years.

==== Women's cross country ====
The Lady Cardinals won three consecutive Southland Conference Titles from 2004 to 2006. This series of titles tied the record amount of consecutive conference titles in the Southland Conference. The Lady Cardinals won back-to-back conference titles in 2013 and 2014. After a fourteen-year gap, the Lady Cardinals won the 2023 Southland Conference cross country championship.

==== Women's golf ====
The Lady Cardinals won back to back to back Southland Conference championships in 2013, 2014, 2015, and 2016 bringing the conference championship total to seven. The four Southland Conference championships in a row is the most women's golf consecutive conference championships. The Lady Cardinals also won four consecutive Sun Belt Conference championships from 1993 through 1996. In post season play, the Lady Cardinals appeared in five consecutive AIAW tournaments from 1977 through 1981. The team also appeared in eight NCAA tournaments as a team (1983, 1991, 1993, 1995, 2013, 2014, 2015, and 2016) finishing with top ten finishes in 1983 and 1991 at 7th and 8th respectively. Five Lady Cardinals appeared as individuals in five NCAA National tournaments (1984, 1987, 1989, 1992, 1994) and two Lady Cardinals appeared as individuals at the NCAA Regional level in 1994.

All-Americans

- Dawn Coe-Jones, first team, 1983
- Lori Brock, first team, 1984
- Jennifer Wyatt, honorable mention, 1987
- Elsabe Hefer, second team, 1989
- Louisa Bergsma, honorable mention, 1993

==== Women's soccer ====
Lady Cardinals soccer began its inaugural season in 2007 under coach Mathew Dillon. On November 5, 2007, Matthew Dillon resigned. Dewi Hardman took over at the end of the 2007 season. He resigned on May 7, 2012. Orlando Cervantes was named the Lady Cardinals' head soccer coach on July 16, 2012. Cervantes resigned at the conclusion of the fourth season. Steve Holeman was named head women's soccer coach on January 12, 2016. Holeman spent five seasons as head coach of the Georgia Bulldogs and was head coach for the Ole Miss Rebels for 16 seasons before moving to Georgia. Holeman resigned in early 2022 to head the Texas State soccer program. Nathan Kogut was named the Lady Cardinals head coach in 2022. Kogut's inaugural team won the regular season championship, the SLC tournament championship, and participated in the 2022 NCAA Division I women's soccer tournament. In Kogut's second season, his team repeated winning the regular season championship, the SLC tournament championship, and will participate in the 2023 NCAA Division I women's soccer tournament. Coach Kogut was named SLC women's coach of the year in both 2022 and 2023.

For the 2007 and 2008 seasons, the Lady Cardinals called Provost Umphrey Stadium (formerly named Cardinal Stadium) home. The Lamar Soccer Complex was built in 2009. The first match at the complex was against the New Mexico State Aggies on September 25, 2009. In the 2010 season the Lady Cardinals went 5–11–3 and narrowly secured a berth to their first ever play off game. The Lady Cardinals qualified for the 2011 and 2012 conference tournaments also, and were runner-up in the 2012 tournament. In 2017, the team won the Southland Conference regular season, the 2017 Southland Conference Women's Soccer Tournament, and participated in the 2017 NCAA Division I Women's Soccer Tournament. In 2019, the team returned to post season competition winning the Southland Conference regular season, the 2019 Southland Conference Women's Soccer Tournament, and participating in the 2019 NCAA Division I Women's Soccer Tournament. The Lady Cardinals repeated in 2022 in winning the Southland Conference regular season championship, the SLC tournament championship, and participation in the 2022 NCAA Division I women's soccer tournament.

==== Softball ====
LU first sponsored softball from 1971 through 1977 competing in the AIAW. Lamar finished second in the 1972 AIAW Texas state tournament.

In 1983 Lamar added softball as a Division I sport and competed in the Southland conference. When Lamar left the Southland Conference in the 1987 season, the sport was dropped.

On April 22, 2011, athletic director Larry Tidwell announced plans to reinstate college softball as an NCAA Division I sport at Lamar University. On August 1, 2011, former Morehead State head coach Holly Bruder was announced as the finalist to fill the head coaching position at Lamar after over 20 years without a program.

On September 4, 2012, the Lady Cardinals held their first practice. The inaugural game of the newly reinstated program was played on September 22, 2012, before a standing room only crowd vs Texas Woman's University. The game ended as an 8–8 tie at the end of eight innings. The Lady Cardinals finished the season with an overall record of 24–35 and a conference record of 14–13, finishing high enough to qualify for the Southland Conference softball tournament held in Natchitoches, LA.

Offsite Ford Park was the home field for the first two seasons back. On October 17, 2014, a ground breaking ceremony for the new Lamar Softball Complex was held. Although still under construction, the first game at the new stadium was played on March 6, 2015, against the Houston Baptist Huskies.

==== Women's tennis ====
Competing every season since 1976, the Lady Cardinals tennis team is currently coached by David Wong who is in his fourteenth (14th) year at Lamar. The team competed with the Association of Intercollegiate Athletics for Women until 1981 when it began competition as an NCAA Division I team. In AIAW competition, the doubles team of Cathy Beene and Linda Rupert won the National AIAW Doubles championship in 1973. Beene and Rupert also captured four Texas AIAW Singles championships (Beene – 1970, 71 and Rupert – 1972, 73) and two Texas AIAW Doubles championships (1972, 73). In NCAA competition, the Lady Cardinals have won two Southland Conference championships (1983 and 1985), one Southland Conference tournament championship (2008), and one American South Conference championship (1988).

Lamar Career Coaching Records

Coach	Seasons	Overall record	Winning percentage
Career Coaching Records
Raye Holt	1976–77	6–8	.429
Linda Thomas	1978–80	N/A	N/A
Debbie Gheezi	1981–88	112–93	.546
Carol Gore	1989–91	14–32	.304
Tim Calhoun	1992–93	14–23	.378
Claire Pollard	1994–98	62–39	.613
Tom Lowry	1999–2000	22–28	.440
David Wong	2001–present	170–149	.533
Overall	39 Seasons	400–372	.518

Note: Overall is misstated since it is based only on available records.

==== Women's track and field ====
The Lady Cardinals field teams for both Indoor and Outdoor Track and Field. In addition to numerous conference individual championships over the history of the program, the Lady Cardinals won the Sun Belt Conference outdoor team championship in 1992.

Two future Olympians, Midde Hamrin and Yamelis Ortiz, ran for the Lady Cardinals.

==== Volleyball ====
Competing every season from 1973, the Lady Cardinals Volleyball team is currently coached by head coach Brandon Crisp. McDonald Gym is the current home court. While McDonald Gym has been home court since 2007, both McDonald Gym and the Montagne Center have served as home courts over the life of the program. McDonald Gym underwent renovations at the same time the Sheila Umphrey Recreational Sports Center was constructed. Following renovation of McDonald Gym, the Volleyball team moved to its current home.

AIAW years

Since 1982, the program has competed as an NCAA Division I program. From 1973 to 1981, the program competed in the AIAW (1973–1981). As an AIAW member, the Lady Cardinals won the state AIAW championship in 1975 and finished seventh in the AIAW Nationals. The team also won regional AIAW championships in 1976 and 1977 finishing ninth in the AIAW Nationals both years. The team also finish fourteenth in the AIAW Nationals in 1979.

NCAA Division I years

Competing as an NCAA Division I program, the team has won four regular season conference championships including one American South Conference championship (1990), one Sun Belt Conference championship (1997), and two Southland Conference championships (2001, 2007). The team also won five conference tournament championships including three Southland Conference championships (1983, 1984, 2008), one American South Conference championship (1987), and one Sun Belt Conference championship (1993). The Lady Cardinals participated in the NCAA Division I Volleyball tournament four times (1983, 1984, 1993, 2008). The Lady Cardinals best conference record was in 2007 with a 15–1 regular season Southland Conference championship record under head coach Justin Gilbert. From 2007 to 2009 the team won 36 of its 48 regular season conference games.

== Venues and facilities ==
=== General facilities ===
- The 54,000 sq ft Dauphin Athletic Complex opened in 2010 is the main sports performance facility for varsity sports at Lamar. The center includes meeting rooms, athletic training facilities, athlete lounge area, an 8,000 sq ft strength center, locker rooms for home and visitors, 108 seat meeting room with theater seating, offices, and an academic center. The center was part of a $29 million project to completely renovate the football stadium as well as build the new athletic complex. Funding for the project included $21.5 million in bonds with the remainder financed by private donations.

- Locker rooms for home and visiting teams
- 108 team meeting room
- Four player position rooms for game film and game book study
- Academic study center and computers
- Players lounge
- Video room
- Equipment room
- Hydrotherapy room
- Sports medicine facility
- Offices for coaches and athletic department administration

- The Sheila Umphrey Recreational Sports Center was the result of a $19 million renovation in 2007 of the pre-existing McDonald Gym as well as new construction. A $5 million donation from Walter and Sheila Umphrey in 2005 provided part of the funding for the project. Features included for all students include a 1/10 mile indoor track, a 43' climbing wall, 13,000 sq ft room for free-weight and cardiovascular training. Additionally courts for basketball, handball, badminton, racquetball, squash, indoor soccer, and roller hockey. Also included is a wellness center as well as a lounge area and outdoor putting green. Although much of the center is open to all students, the west side of the 129,550 sq ft center is reserved for student-athletes, coaches and staff. Offices, study rooms, training rooms, a student lounge and McDonald Gym, where the Lady Cardinals volleyball team plays, are located in the student-athlete section.

=== Baseball ===
The Vincent Beck Stadium is a lighted stadium with a seating capacity of 3,500 including 700 chairback seats.

- Strait Indoor Practice Facility

The 9,600 sq ft practice facility has indoor bull pens and batting cages as well as covered outdoor batting cages.

- Baseball Locker Rooms

The 1,600 sq ft team locker room has 35 oak lockers and other amenities.

=== Basketball ===
The Montagne Center, home of both the Cardinals and Lady Cardinals basketball teams, is a 10,080 multi-purpose arena. The center includes several large meeting rooms as well as offices and training areas.

- Cardinal Club Room – 3,442 sq ft. Can service 128 people banquet style or 180 in reception style. Includes a kitchenette, bar, and PA system.
- Red Room – 1,400 sq ft on fifth floor of center. Has views of basketball court as well as adjacent football stadium. Seats 50 banquet style or 75 reception style. Includes wet bar, private restrooms.

=== Football ===
Provost Umphrey Stadium is a 16,000 seat outdoor football stadium.

- The Vernon Glass Field of Champions includes two grass football practice fields and a covered pavilion.

=== Soccer and softball ===
The LU Soccer and Softball Complex building, located in between the soccer stadium and the softball stadium, includes a training room, coaches' offices, locker rooms for home and visitors as well as ticketing and concessions for both sports.

- Lamar Soccer Complex

The soccer stadium opened in 2009. It has a seating capacity of 500 and is equipped with lighting for night-time games. The field also has a programmable irrigation and fertilization system. The 2014 Southland Conference Soccer Tournament was held at the Lamar Soccer Complex on November 6–9, 2014.

- Lamar Softball Complex

The Lady Cardinals played the 2012–2013 and 2013–2014 seasons at an off campus site, Ford Park Softball Complex. An on campus stadium was built in 2014–15. Permanent seating capacity is 500. Additional seating is available via berms behind the outfield fences. The berms extend from the left field line to mid right field. Groundbreaking for the new stadium was held on October 17, 2014. The first game at the partially completed softball complex was played on March 6 against the Houston Baptist Huskies. Stadium construction was completed after completion of the 2015 season.

=== Tennis ===
The Thompson Family Tennis Center received a total renovation in 2009. As a result of the renovation project, the tennis center has sixteen (16) outdoor courts including five (5) stadium courts with covered stadium seating for over 400 spectators. Additional seating for over 600 is provided for the remaining eleven (11) courts. The center has an electronic scoreboard capable of remotely scoring six matches at once.

- Tennis Support Building – Included in the A building includes a pro shop/meeting room, locker rooms, and restrooms.

=== Track and field ===
- Ty Terrell Track Complex has a seating capacity of 1,000. It is located next to the Thompson Family Tennis Center. A 2015 stadium renovation included installation of new runways and jump pits as well as resurfacing the track and areas within the stadium with a Tarkoff BSS300 surface. Estimated project cost was $396,200.00.

=== Volleyball ===
- McDonald Gym is now part of the 129,550 sq ft Sheila Umphrey Recreational Sports Complex. The Gym has a seating capacity of 500 for volleyball.

=== Photos ===
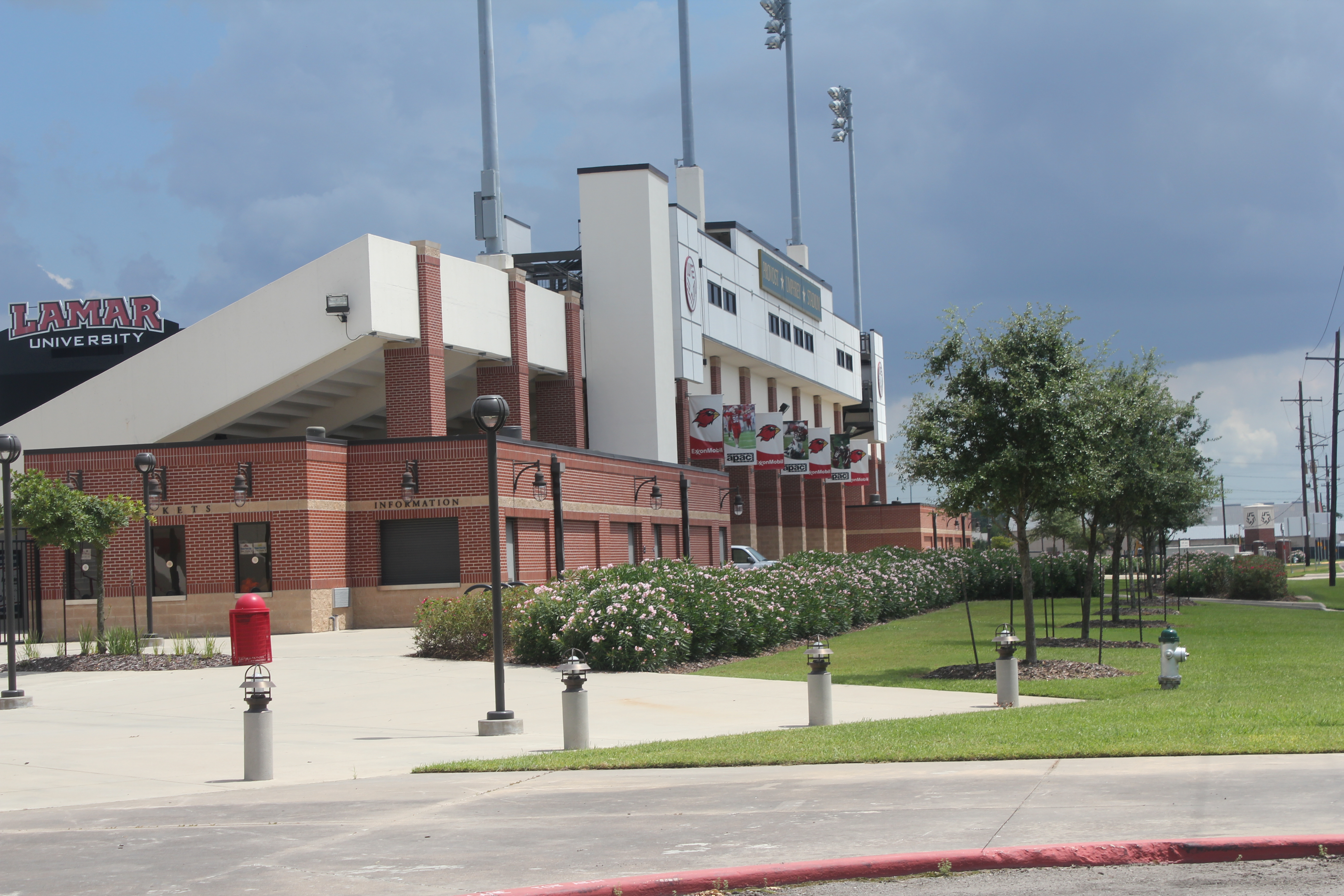
Outside Provost Umphrey Stadium

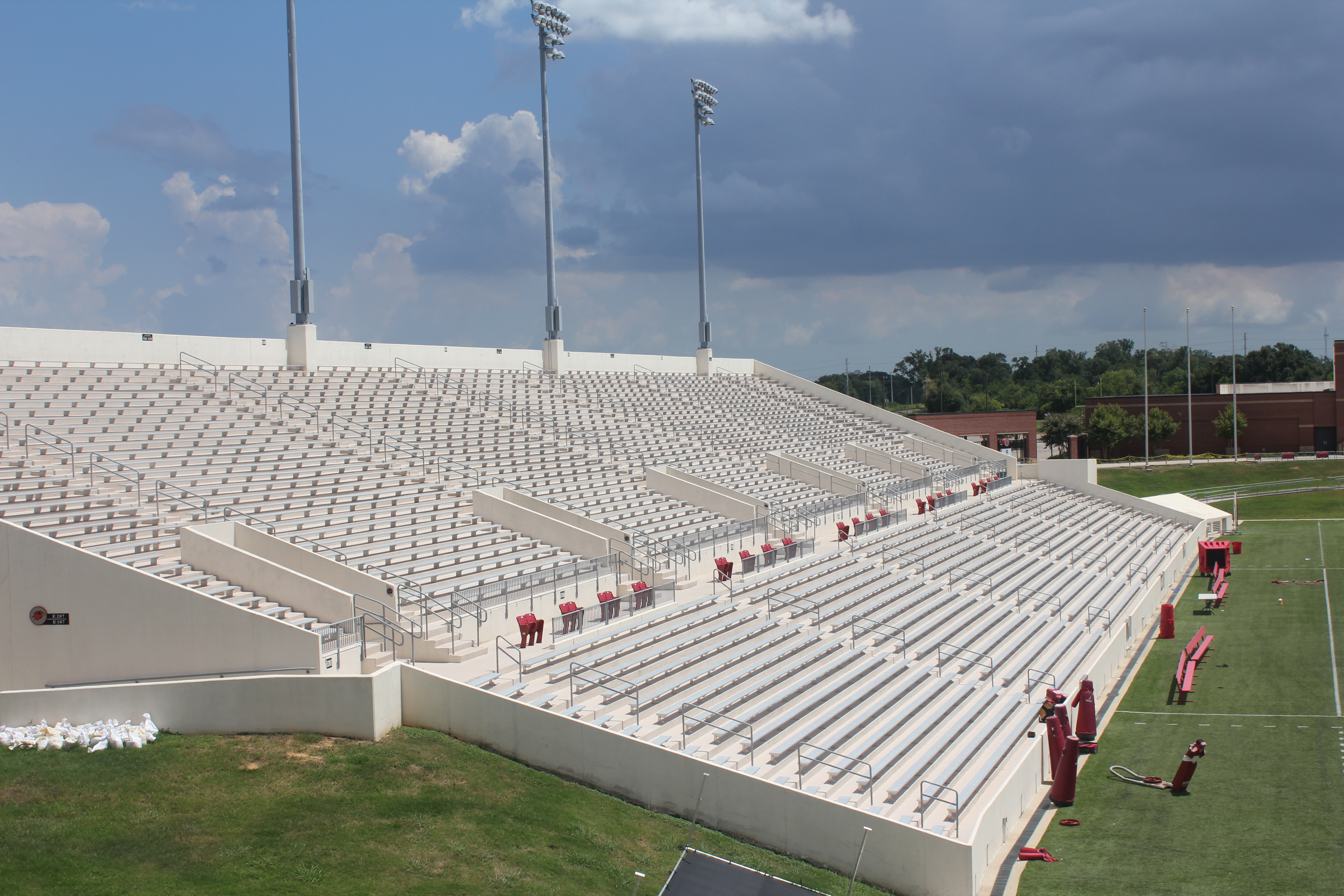
Provost Umphrey Stadium – east side

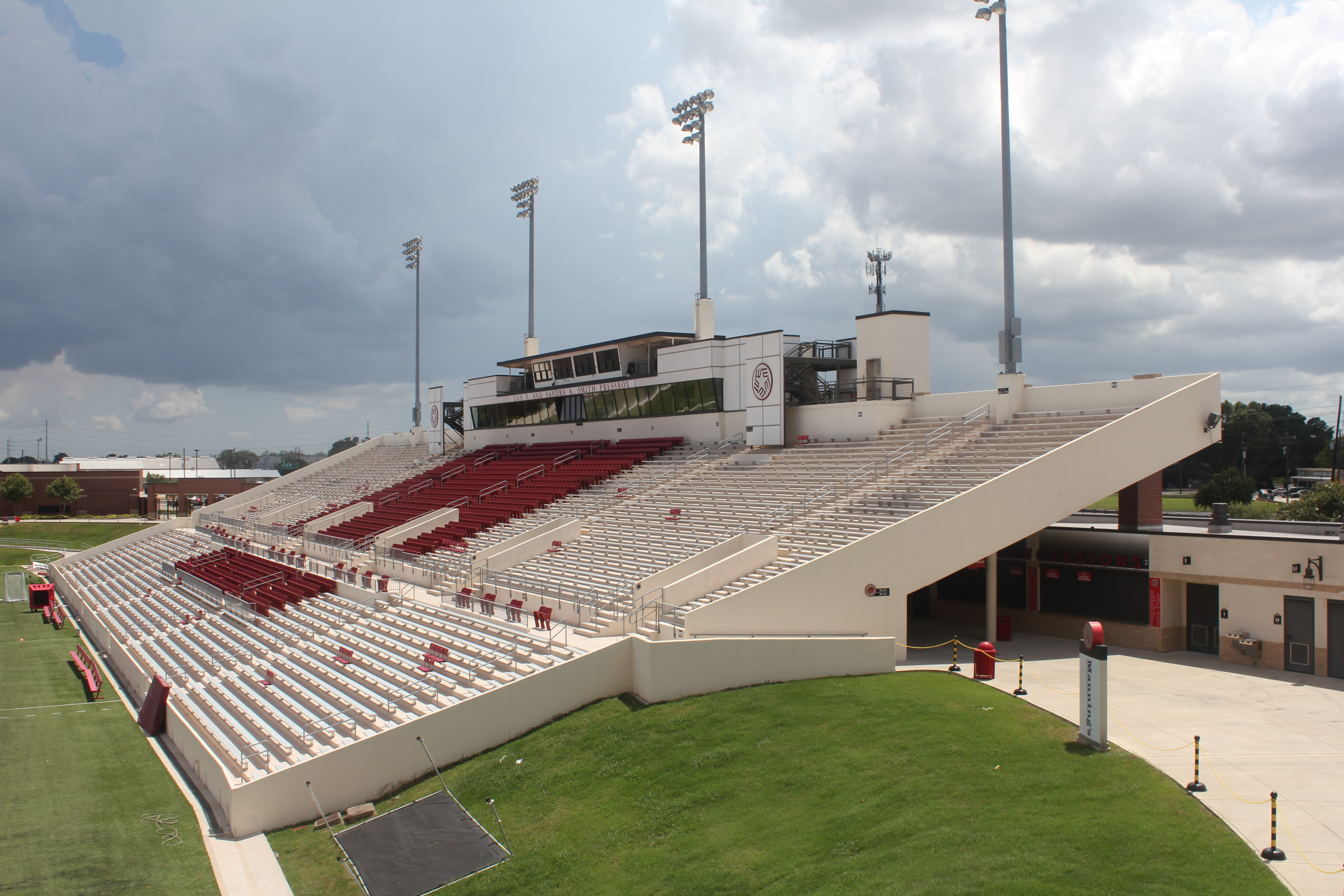
Provost Umphrey Stadium – west side

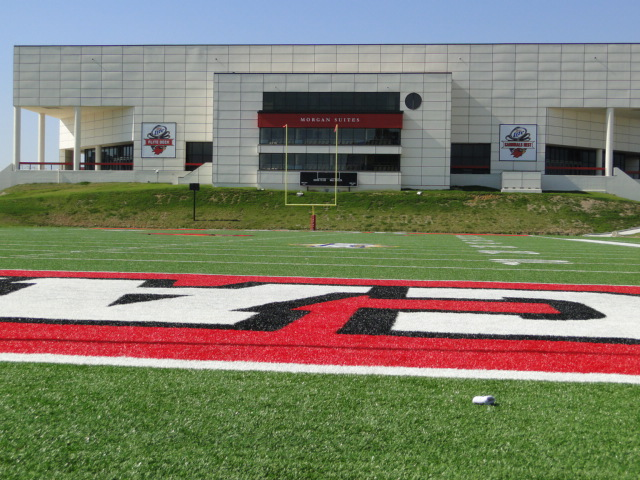
Montagne Center and Morgan Suites at Provost Umphrey Stadium

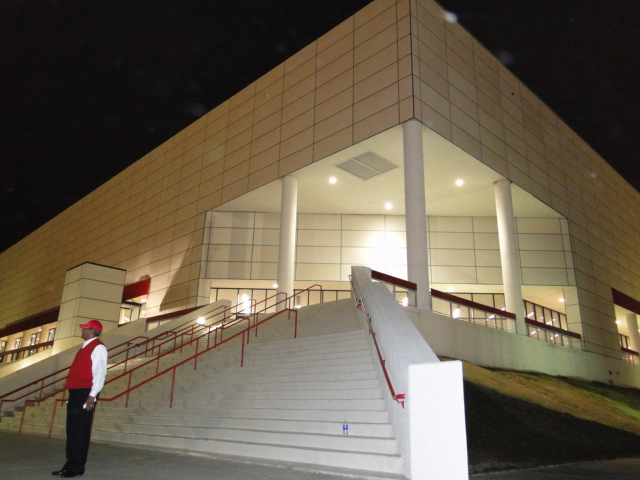
Montagne Center at night

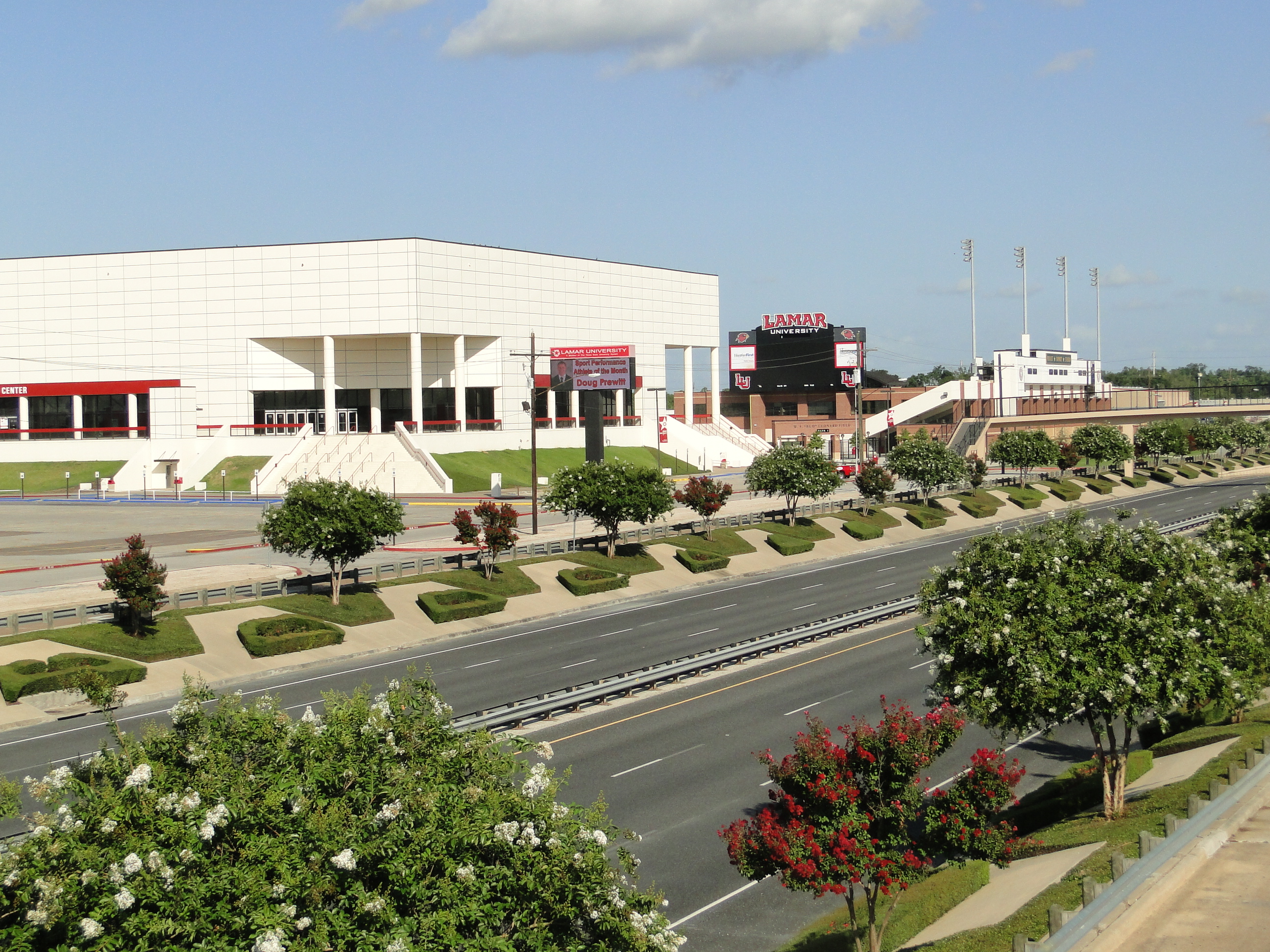
Montagne Center across the freeway

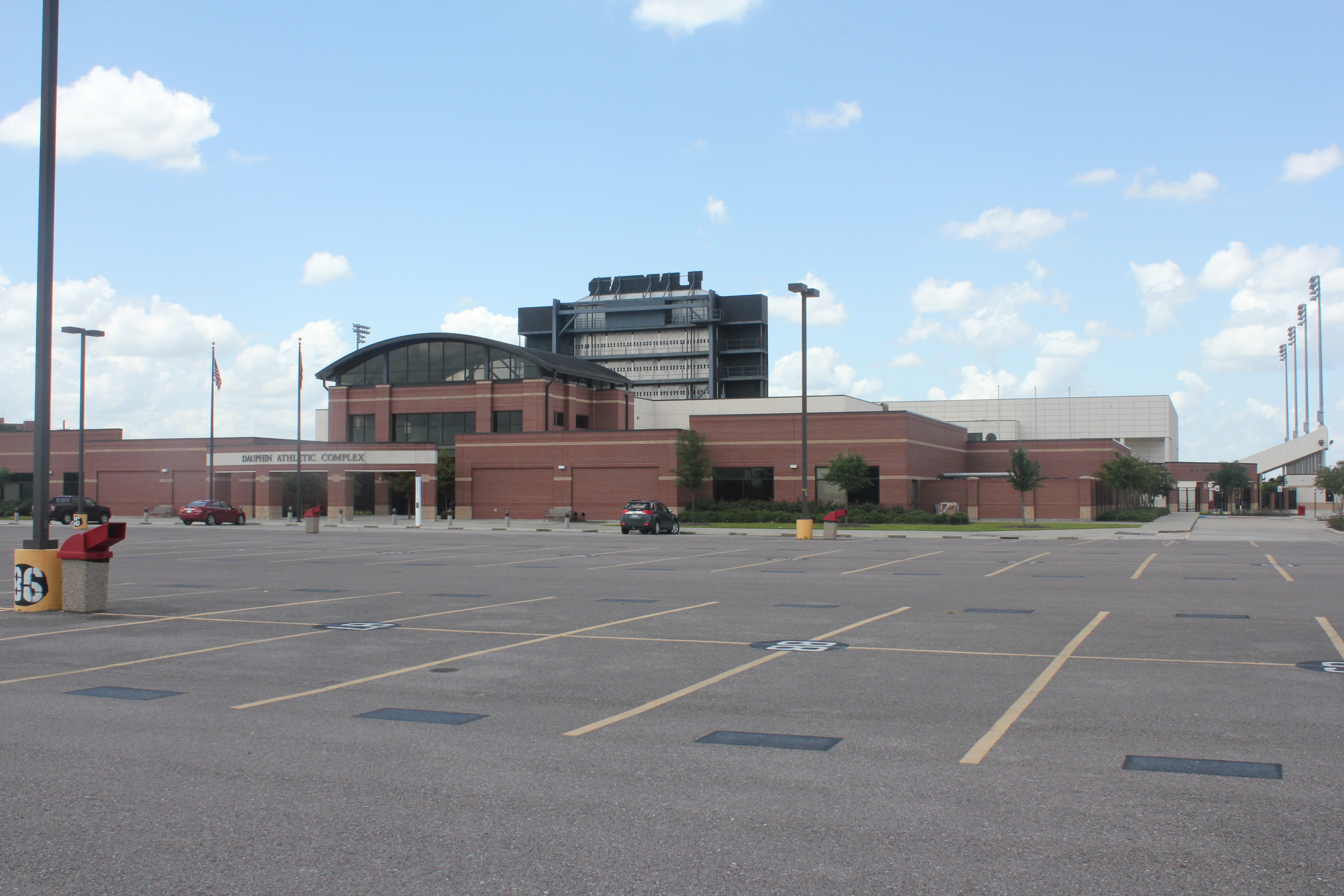
Dauphin Athletic Complex – Front

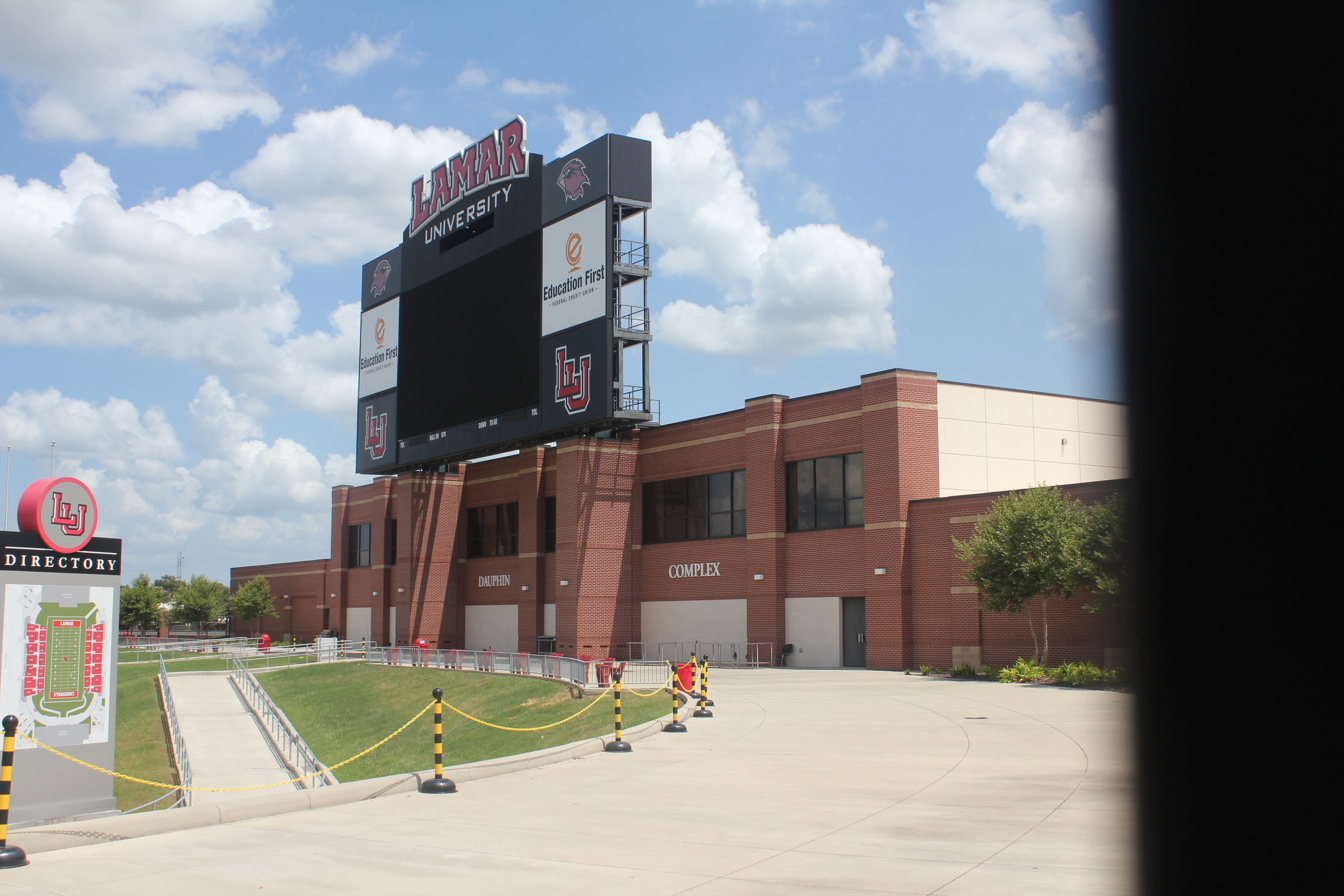
Athletic Complex – Stadium side

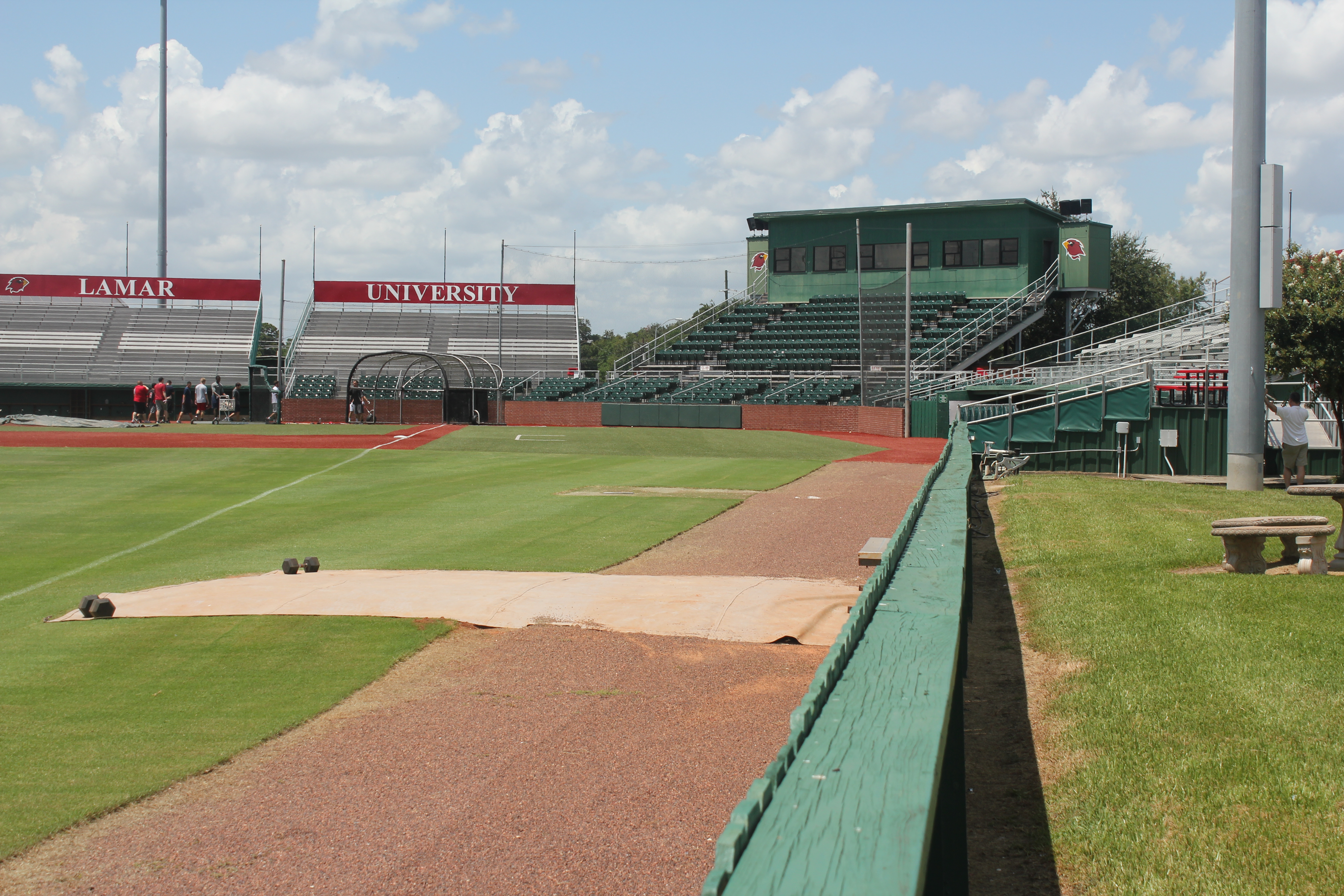
Vincent-Beck Stadium grandstands.

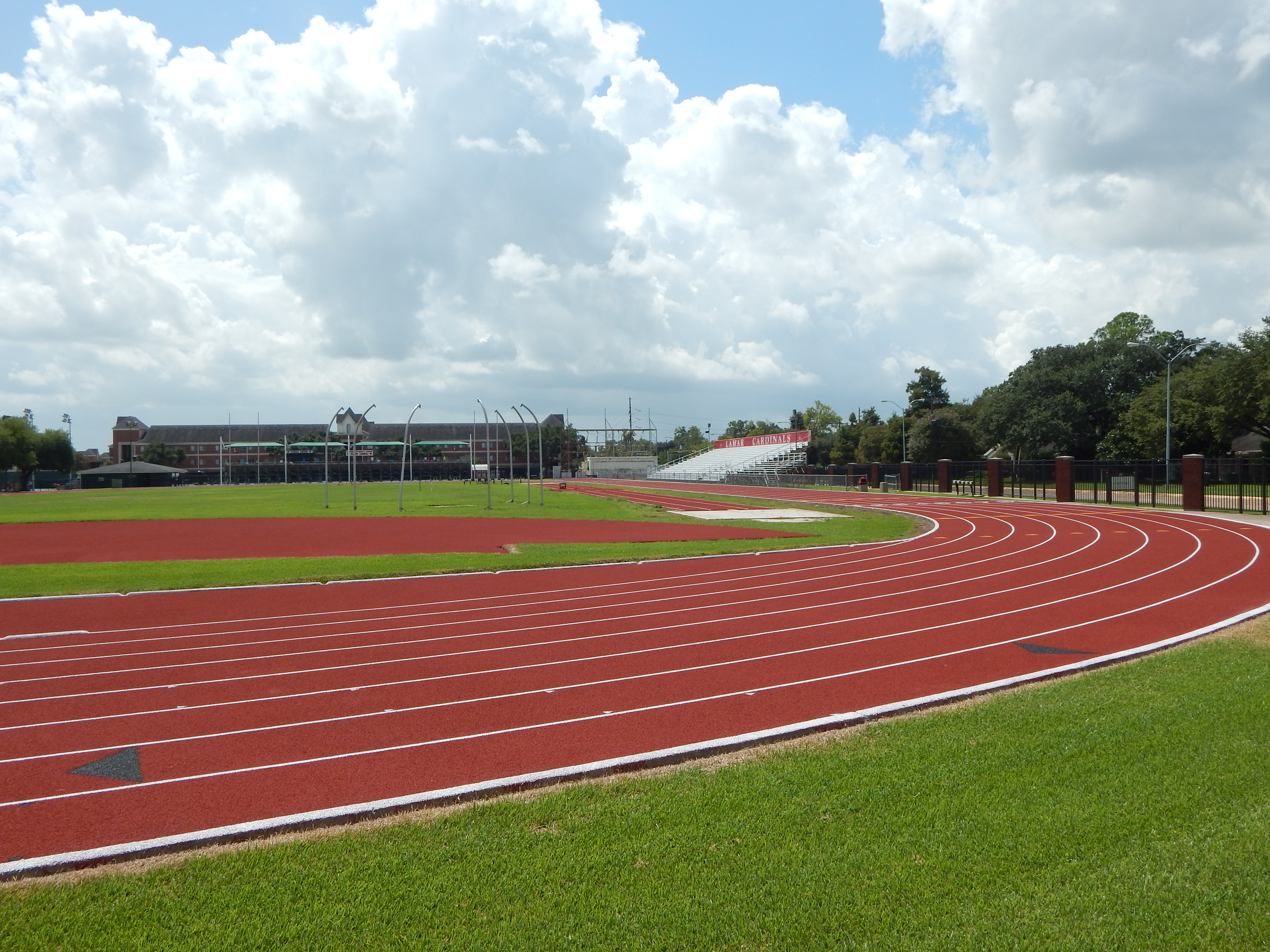
Ty Terrell Track and Field Stadium

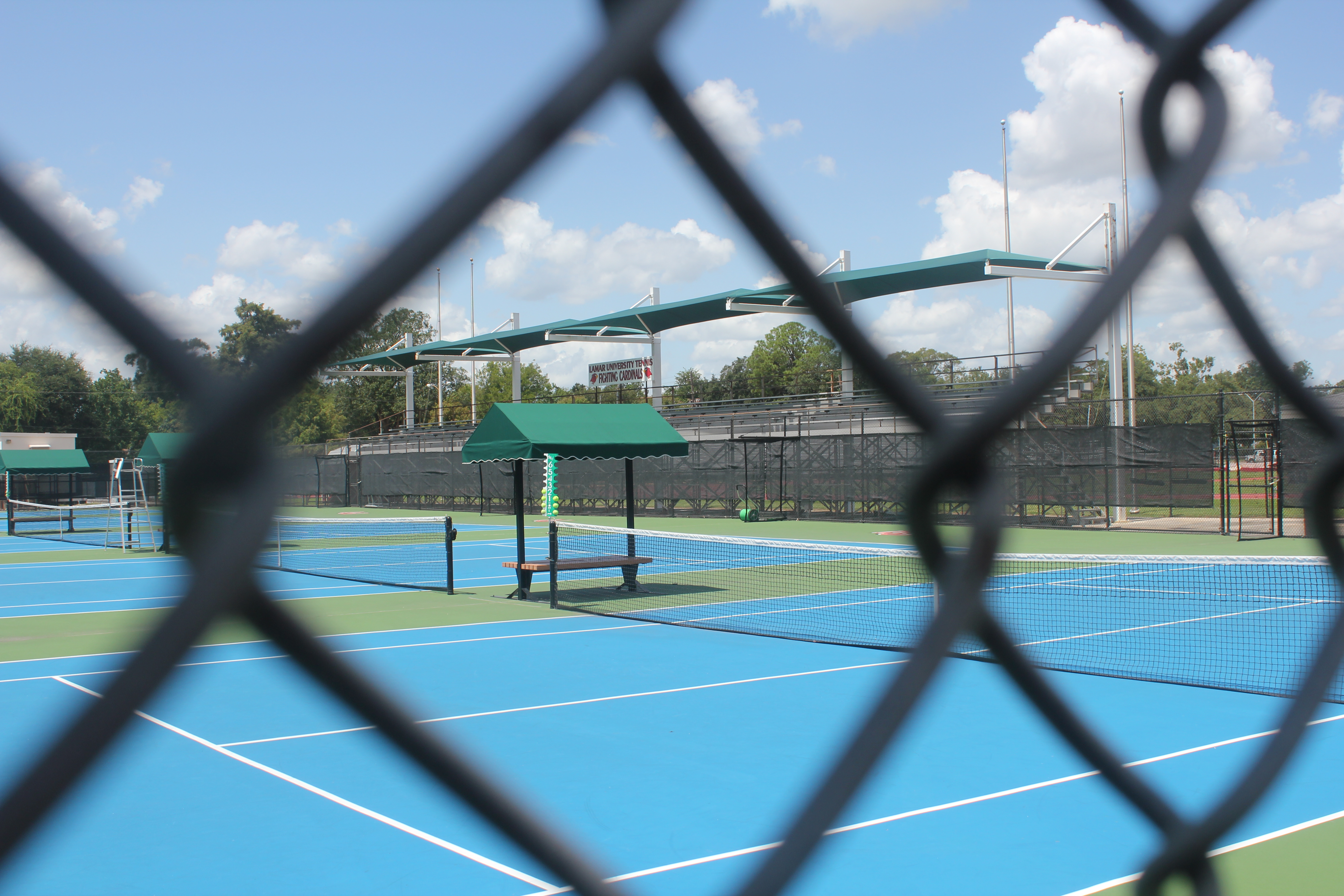
Tennis Courts toward the grandstands

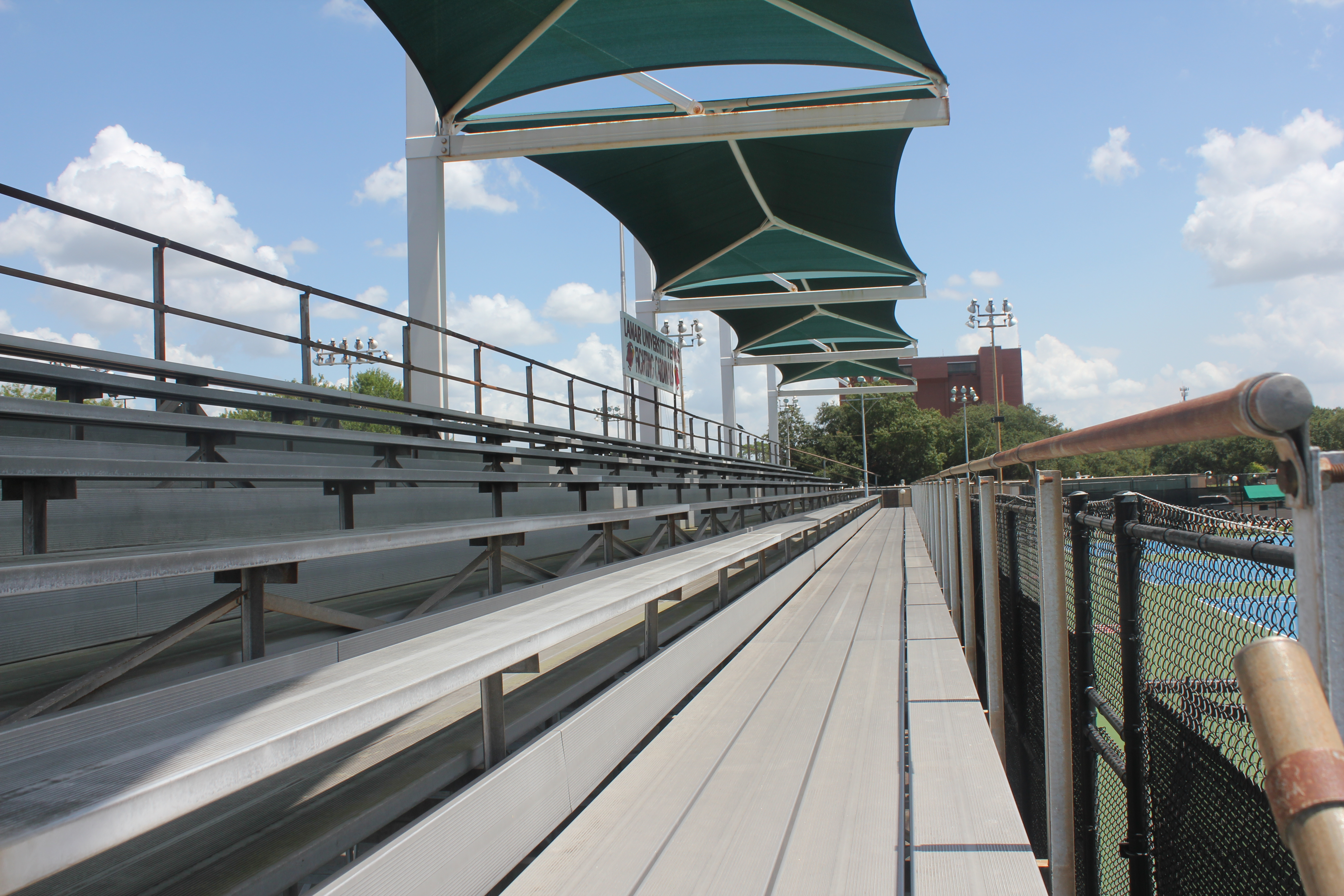
Tennis Courts – View of the grandstands

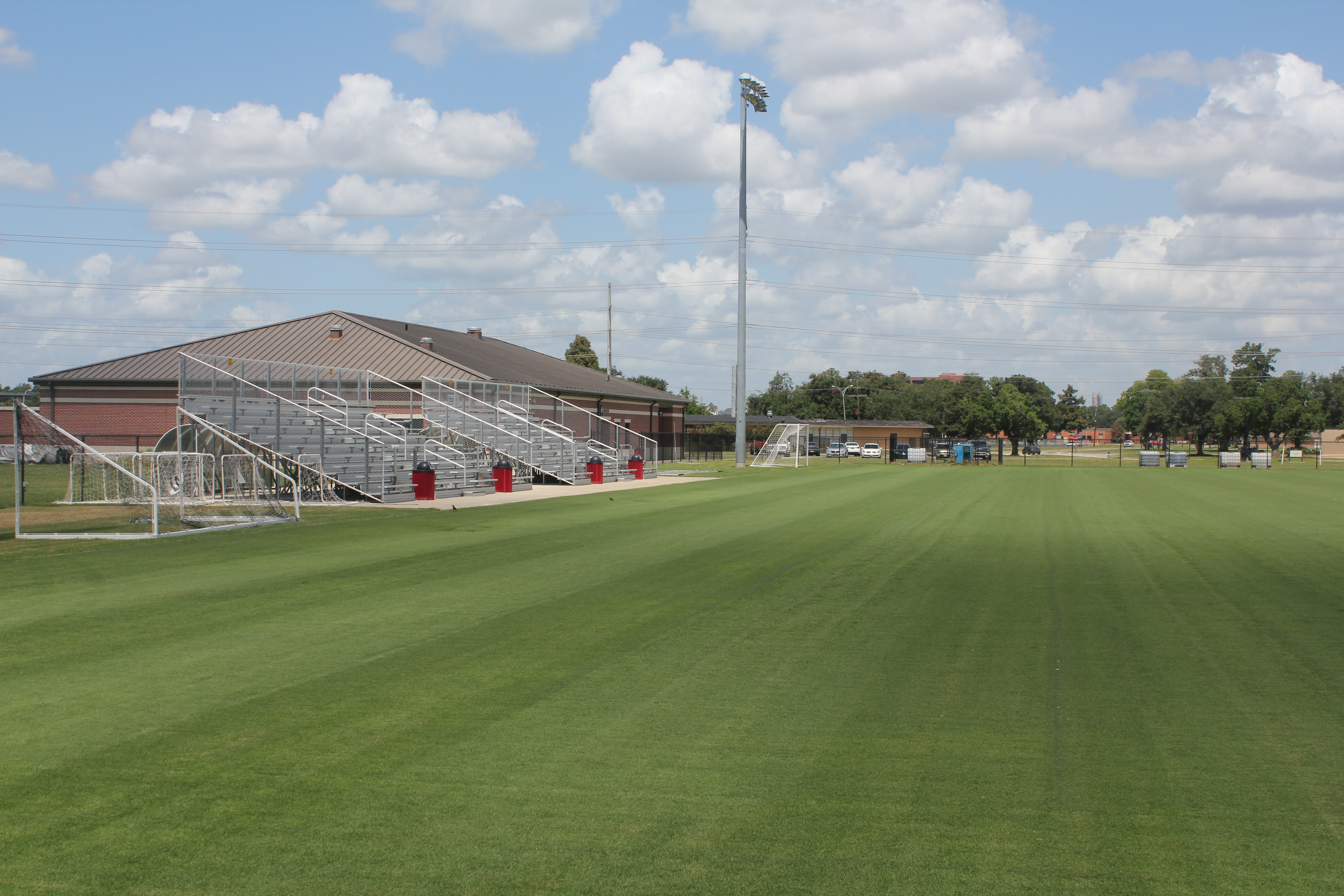
Lamar Soccer Complex grandstands

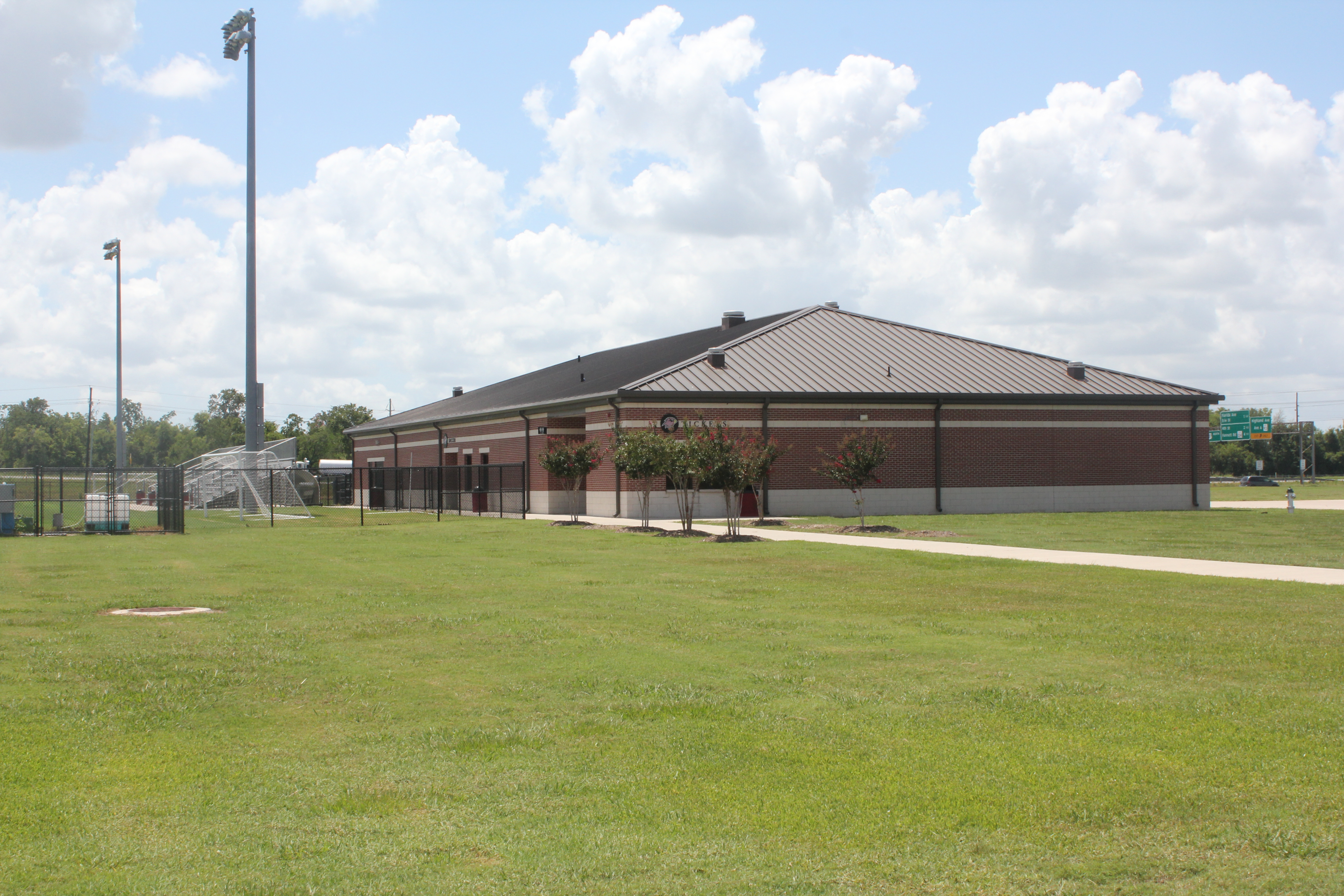
Soccer and Softball Complex Building

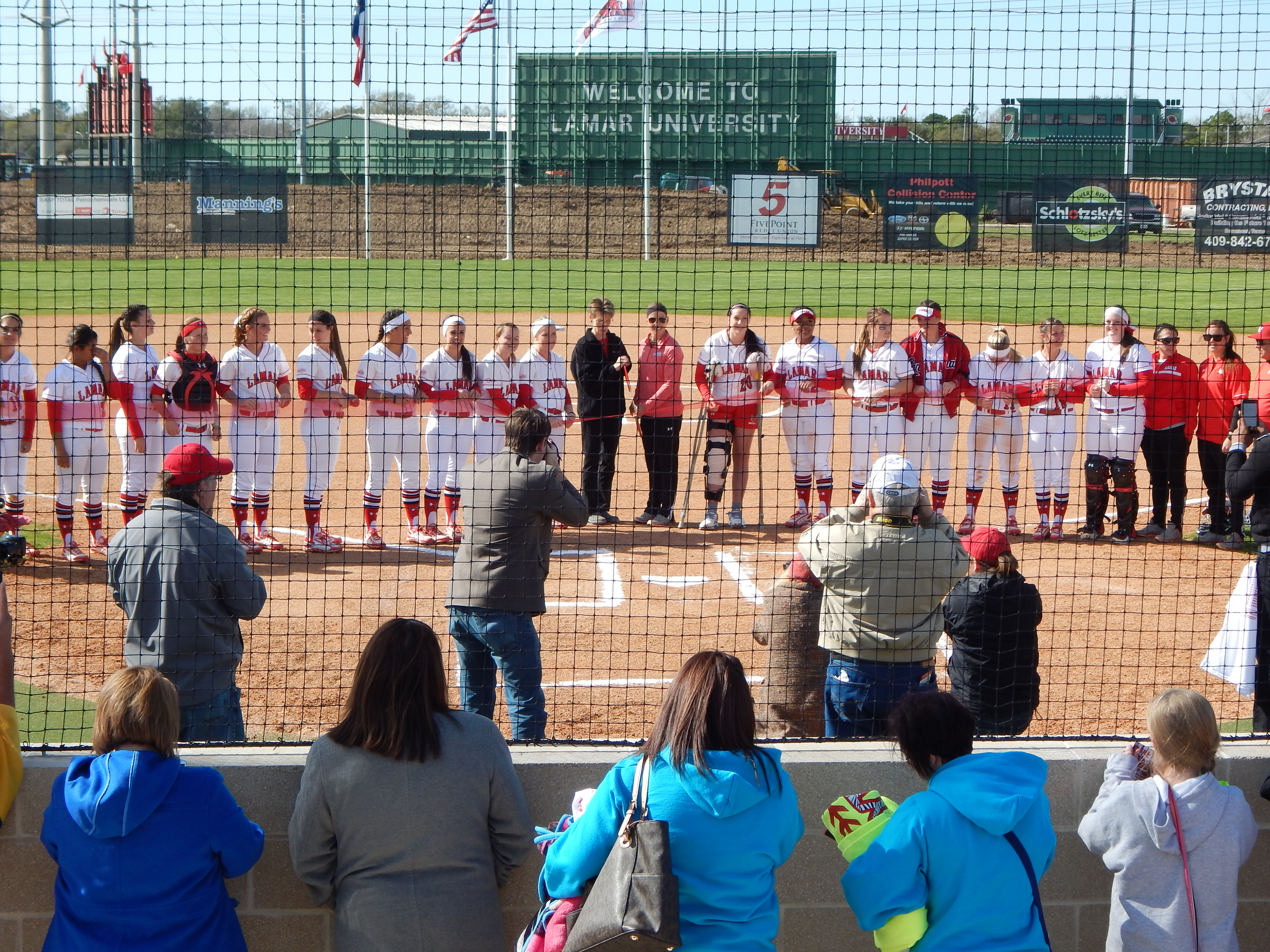
Softball Complex Grand Opening

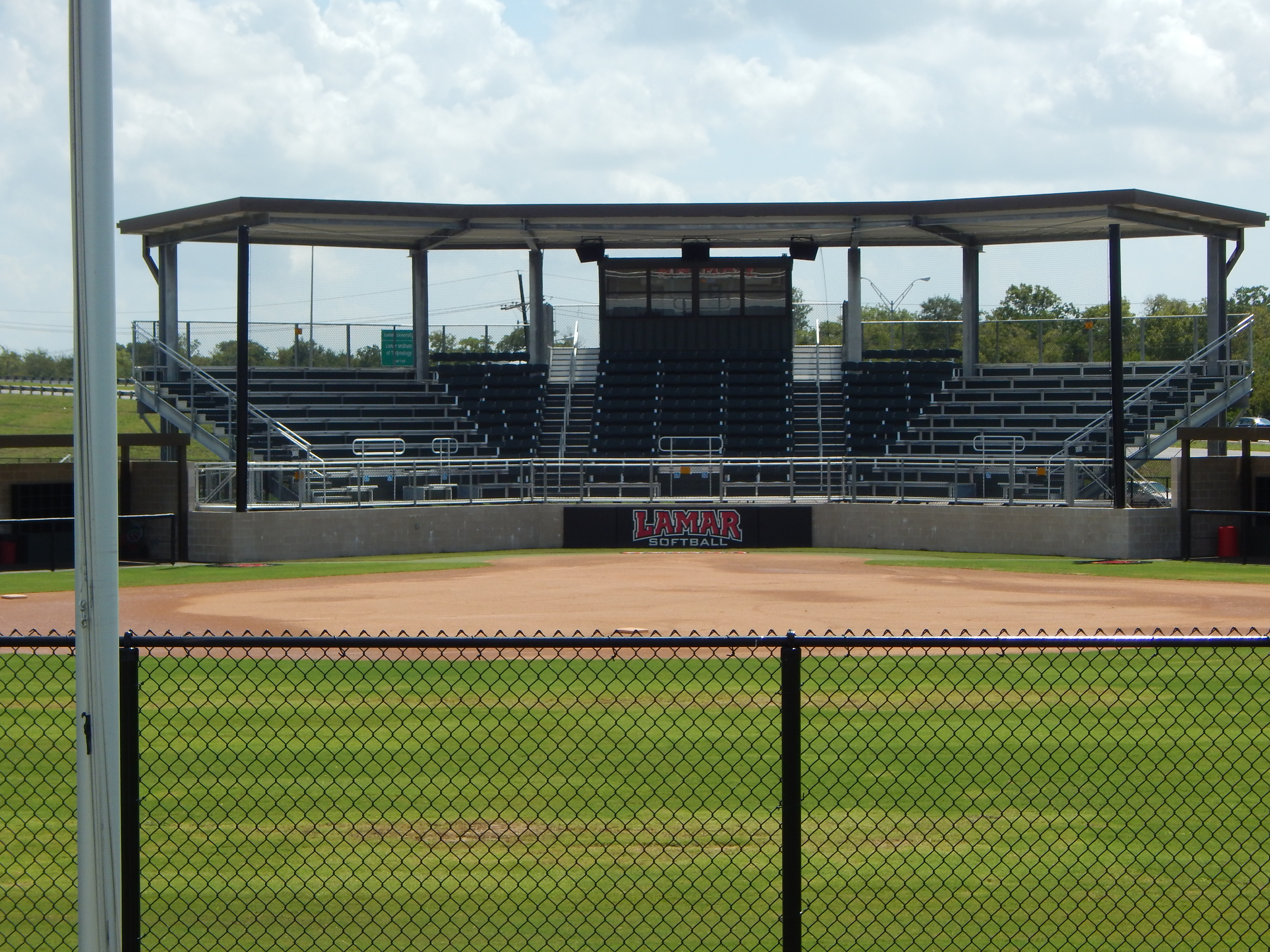
Softball complex grandstands

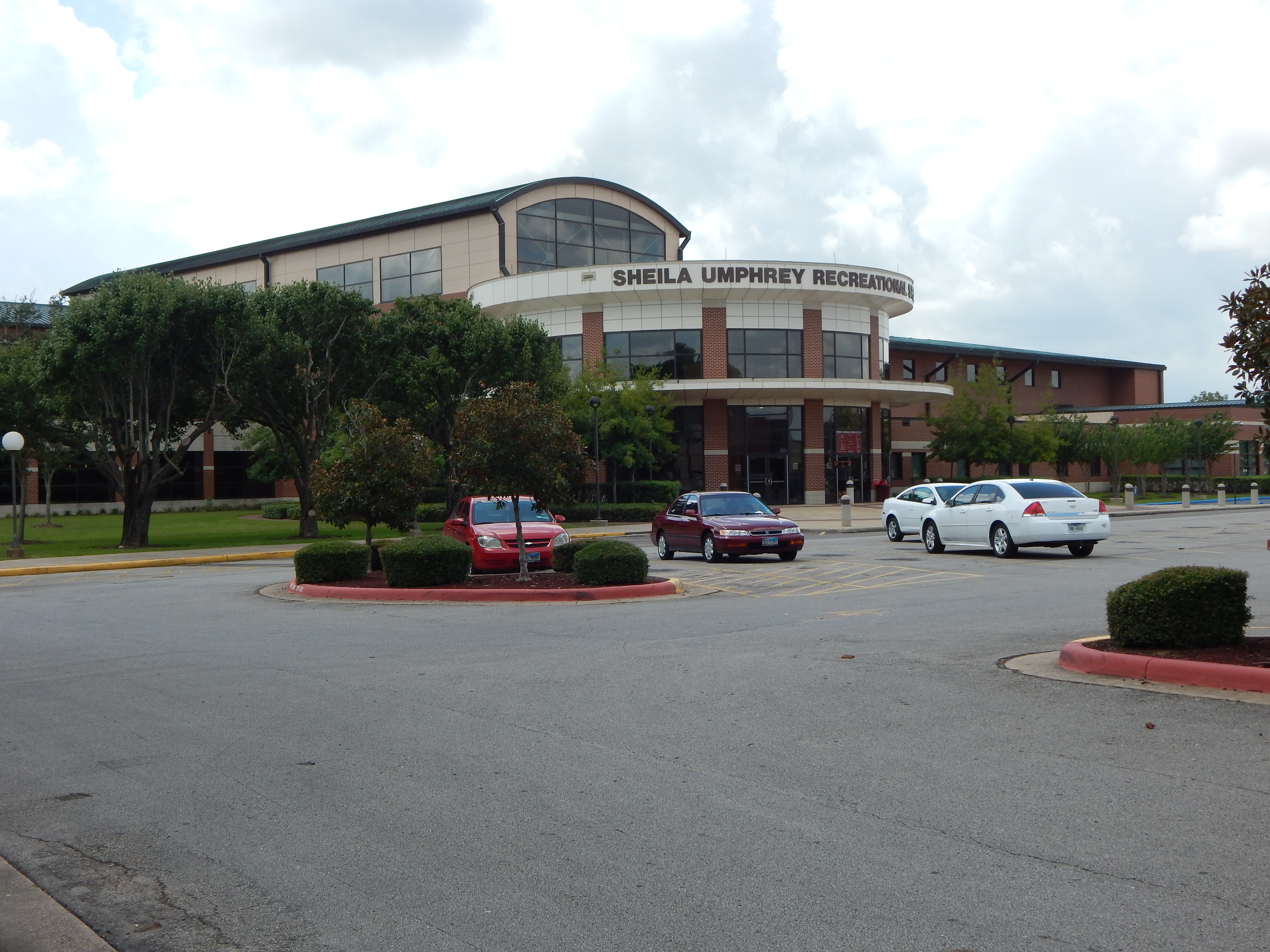
Sheila Umphrey Recreation Center and McDonald Gym

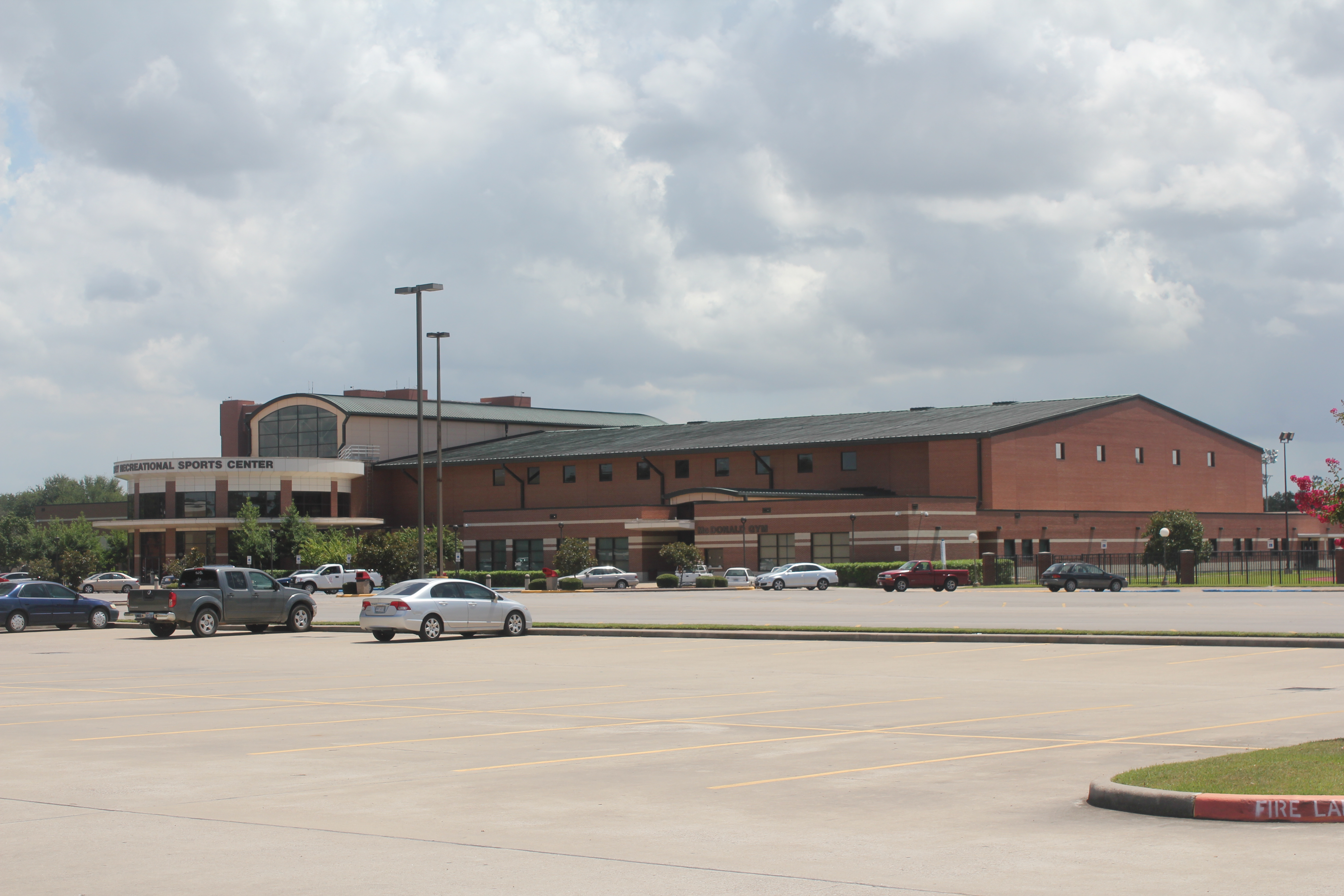
McDonald Gym and Sheila Umphrey Recreation Center

== Rivalries ==
Lamar has had many rivalries over the years. Some extend back to its early days in the Southland Conference on to the American South Conference and its time in the Sun Belt Conference. Others are newer following Lamar's return to the Southland Conference.

McNeese State University – Lamar's biggest current rivals are the McNeese State Cowboys and Cowgirls. Games between the two schools usually are among the highest attended into the Southland Conference. The rivalry features double header basketball games for men's and women's basketball. The weekend baseball series is usually played to allow both teams a home game, the designated home team plays Friday at the opposing school and then plays its Saturday and Sunday matches at home. In 2010 when Lamar revived its football team the fans of both teams packed the 17,000-seat stadium to the brim. The official attendance of 19,235 was the largest game at McNeese since 2002. In 2009, the rivalry was formalized with a joint agreement between the two universities and Verizon Wireless. The "Verizon Wireless Battle of the Border features "...head-to-head and SLC Championship competition in 14 different sports..."

Texas State University System rivalries– Lamar had active rivalries with fellow Texas State University System schools Sam Houston State University and Texas State University. The rivalry with Texas State University cooled after Texas State's departure from the Southland Conference. The rivalry with Sam Houston continued with both Lamar and Sam Houston's move to the WAC. With Lamar's return to the Southland Conference in 2022 and Sam Houston's move to Conference USA in 2023, the rivalry is currently dormant.

During the 70's and 80's Lamar had longstanding basketball rivalries with Southwestern Louisiana (now the University of Louisiana at Lafayette and branded athletically as "Louisiana"), Louisiana Tech and Arkansas State.

== Conference and National Championships ==
=== Western Athletic Conference ===
- Men's Tennis Regular Season: 2022

=== Southland Conference ===
- Baseball
  Regular season: 1971, '75, '76, '77, '79, '81, '84, '85, '2003, '04
  tournament champion: 2002, '04, '10
- Men's Basketball
  Division: 2007, 2008 (East)
  Regular season: 1964, '70, '78 (T), '79, '80, '81, '83, '84, 2000 '08, '12
  tournament champion: '81, '83, 2000, '12
- Football – 1964, '65, '66, '71
- Men's Cross Country- 1979, '81, '82, '83, '84, 2006, '07, '08, '09, '10, '11, '13, '14, '15, '16, '17, '19
- Men's Golf – 1964, '65, '66, '67, '68, '69, '70, '71, '72, '73, '81, '82, '83, '85, '86, '87, 2001, '02, '03, '06, '07, '08, '09, '12
- Men's Track & Field (Outdoor) – 1971, '78, '79, '80, '81, '82, '83, '84, '85, '86
- Men's Track & Field (Indoor) – 1980, '81, '82, '83, '84, '85
- Men's Tennis
  Regular season: 1967, '73, '74, '75, '76, 2016, '17 (T)
  Conference tournament: 2016, '17, '18
- Women's Basketball
  Division: 2008 (East), 2010 (West)
  Regular season: 2008 (T), 2010 (T)
  tournament champion: 2010
- Women's Cross Country- 2004, '05, '06, '13, '14, '23
- Women's Golf – 2003, '05, '06', '13, '14, '15, '16
- Women's Soccer
  Regular season - 2018,'19, '22, '23
  tournament champion - 2018, '19, '22, '23
- Women's Tennis – 1983, '84, 2008
- Volleyball – 1983, '84, '01 '07

=== Sun Belt Conference ===
- Baseball
  Regular season: 1993
  Conference tournament: 1993, '95
- Women's Basketball – 1992
- Women's Golf – 1993, '94, '95, ‘96
- Women's Track & Field – 1992
- Volleyball – 1993, '97

=== Lone Star Conference ===
- Men's Basketball – 1961, '62 (T), '63 (T)
- Football – 1954
- Men's Golf – 1953, '54, '55, '56, '57, '58, '59, '60, '61, '62, '63
- Men's Tennis – 1952, '53, '54, '55, '56, '57, '58, '59, '60, '61, '62, '63
- Men's Track & Field – 1963

=== American South Conference ===
- Women's Basketball – 1991
- Women's Tennis – 1988
- Men's Cross Country – 1988, '89
- Volleyball – 1987, '90

=== NAIA National Championships ===
- Men's Tennis – 1955, '56, '57, '58, '59, '60
- Men's Golf – Championship: 1956, '57, '58, '60, '61

Runner-up: 1959

=== NCAA College Division National Championships ===
- Men's Golf – 1967, '68

=== All-Americans ===
- Men's & Women's Track & Field – 40
- Men's Basketball – 3
- Women's Basketball – 1
- Men's Cross Country – 5
- Football – 6 (3 NCAA D-II, 3 NCAA D-I-AA/FCS)
- Men's Golf – 9
- Women's Golf – 5
- Men's & Women's Tennis – 18
- Volleyball – 1

== Cardinals in the major leagues ==
=== MLB ===
- Clay Hensley
- Kevin Millar
- Eric Cammack
- Brian Sanches
- Jerald Clark
- Phil Brassington
- Micah Hoffpauir
- Beau Allred
- Dave Smith
- Tony Mack
- Bruce Aven
- Randy Williams

=== PGA ===
- Chris Stroud
- Trevor Dodds
- Kelly Gibson
- John Riegger
- Ronnie Black
- Shawn Stefani
- Dawie van der Walt

=== LPGA ===
- Jennifer Wyatt
- Dawn Coe

=== NBA ===
- Clarence Kea
- Tom Sewell
- Adrian Caldwell

=== NFL ===
- Billy Ray Bell
- Kevin Bell
- Charles Cantrell
- Rondy Colbert
- Johnny Fuller
- Pat Gibbs
- Anthony "Tony" Guillory
- Herbert Harris
- Bobby Jancik
- Danzell Lee
- Kevin McArthur
- Dudley Meredith (AFL)
- Wayne Moore
- Bum Phillips Coach
- Keith Powe
- Colin Ridgeway
- Eugene Seale
- Tom Smiley
- Johnny Ray Smith

=== Cardinals in the Olympic Games ===
1956 Melbourne

- Colin Ridgeway (Australia), high jump

1960 Rome

- Brian Davis (South Africa), 1600-meter relay
- Colin Ridgeway (Australia) high jump (Bronze)

1980 Moscow

- Christer Gullstrand '83 (Sweden), 400-meter Hurdles
- Doug Hings '82 (Canada), 1600-meter relay

1984 Los Angeles

- Pedro Caceres '84 (Argentina), Steeplechase
- Christer Gullstrand '83 (Sweden), 400-meter Hurdles & 4x400-meter relay
- Thomas Eriksson '85 (Sweden), High Jump & Triple Jump
- Midde Hamrin '83 (Sweden), Marathon

== See also ==
- List of NCAA Division I institutions
