= Lamar Cardinals and Lady Cardinals tennis =

Contents:	Lamar Cardinals tennis – Lamar Lady Cardinals tennis – Thompson Family Tennis Center

== Lamar Cardinals tennis ==
Lamar Cardinals
- University: Lamar University
- Athletic director: Jeff O'Malley
- Head coach: Scott Shankles (12th season)
- Conference: Southland
- Location: Beaumont, Texas, US
- Home Court: Thompson Family Tennis Center (Capacity: 400)
- Nickname: Cardinals
- Colors: Red and white

NCAA Tournament championships
- 1967 (NCAA College Division Doubles Championship)

NCAA Tournament appearances
- 1962*, 1967*, 2016, 2017, 2018; *NCAA College Division

Conference Tournament championships
- Southland 2016, 2017, 2018

Conference regular season champions
- Lone Star 1952*, 1953*, 1954*, 1955*, 1956*, 1957*, 1958*, 1959*, 1960*, 1961*, 1962**, 1963**; Southland 1967**, 1973**, 1974***, 1975, 1976, 2016, 2017; Western Athletic Conference 2022; *NAIA; **NCAA College Division; ***NCAA Division II

The Lamar Cardinals tennis team is the men's team representing Lamar University in the sport of tennis. The team started competition at the four year college level in 1952. The Cardinals compete in NCAA Division I's Southland Conference. Home matches are at the 16 court on campus Thompson Family Tennis Center in Beaumont, Texas. Scott Shankles has been the Cardinals' head coach since the 2010–11 season.

== Championships ==
The Cardinals have won championships ranging from the conference level up to the national level. At the national level, the Cardinals won the NAIA National Championship in Singles and Doubles in 1955, 1956, 1957, 1958. The Cardinals also won the NAIA singles championship in 1959, and 1960. At the NCAA College Division level, the Cardinals won the National Singles Championship in 1967. The Cardinals won an NCAA College Division Regional Championship in both Singles and Doubles 1962. At the NCAA Division I level, the Cardinals won three Southland Conference tournament championships and represented the Southland Conference in the NCAA Division I Men's Tennis tournament in 2016, 2017, and 2018. The Cardinals also won the Southland Conference regular season championship at the NCAA Division I level (1975, 1976, 2016, and 2017). The Cardinals won the WAC regular season championship in 2022.

In addition, Lamar won the Southland Conference regular season championship at the NCAA College Division level (1967 and 1973); at the NCAA Division II level (1974); and at the NCAA Division I level (1975, 1976, 2016, and 2017).

== Honors ==
Southland Conference Player of the Year

- Jakob Paulsen – 2003
- Filip Kanczula – 2008
- Michael Feucht – 2016

Western Athletic Conofernce Player of the Year

- Sancho Arbizu – 2022

Southland Conference Newcomer of the Year

- Filip Kanczula – 2006

Southland Conference Freshman of the Year

- Jakob Paulsen – 2002
- Benny Scheiwzer – 2015

Western Athletic Conference Freshman of the Year

- Sancho Arbizu – 2022

Southland Conference Coach of the Year

- Ron Westbrooks – 1973, '75, '76, '82
- Scott Shankles – 2016

Western Athletic Conference Coach of the Year

- Scott Shankles – 2022

== Year-by-Year Results ==
Season	Overall record	Conference record	Conference standing	Postseason	Final nat'l rank	Notes
NCAA Year-by-Year Results
1952	3-3-1					
1953	2-4		1st			Lone Star Champions
1954	7-4-1		1st			Lone Star Champions
1955	16–1		1st	NAIA National Champions		Lone Star Champions, NAIA National Champions
1956	13–0		1st	NAIA National Champions		Lone Star Champions, NAIA National Champions
1957	20-0-1		1st	NAIA National Champions		Lone Star Champions, NAIA National Champions
1958	20-1		1st	NAIA National Champions		Lone Star Champions, NAIA National Champions
1959	10-2-1		1st	NAIA National Champions		Lone Star Champions, NAIA National Champions
1960	15-0		1st	NAIA National Champions		Lone Star Champions, NAIA National Champions
1961	14–0		1st			Lone Star Champions, transitioning to NCAA
1962	17-0		1st	NCAA College Division Regional Champions		Lone Star Champions, NCAA College Division Regional Champions
1963	10–3–1		1st			Lone Star Champions
1964	11–4	2nd				
1965	11–3–2	2nd				
1966	11–3–1	2nd				
1967	7–7–2	1st	1st	NCAA College Division Regional Champions		Southland Conference Champions, NCAA College Division Regional Champions
1968	14–4–3	3–0–1	2nd			
1969	5–11	3–1	3rd			
1970	6–7	3–1	2nd			
1971	8–8		2nd			
1972	10–10	4–1	2nd			
1973	9–14	4–0	1st			
1974	12–14	2–1	1st			
1975	15–10	4–0	1st			Southland Conference Champion
1976	13–7	4–0	1st			Southland Conference Champion
1977	8–12	2–2	2nd			
1978	10–13	2–2	3rd			
1979	11–11	2–2	3rd			
1980	20–10	–	3rd			
1981	19–15	–	3rd			
1982	11–8	–	2nd			
1983	11–13	–	4th			
1984	14–10	–	3rd			
1985	13–10	–	3rd			
1986	11–9	–	4th			
1987	8–12	–	5th			
1988	0–7	–				No results
1989	–	–				No results
1990	–	–				No results
1991	–	–				No results
1992	–	–				No results
1993	3–16	–				
1994	5–13	–				
1995	8–12	–				
1996	8–11	–				
1997	13–8	–				
1998	7–11	–				
1999	4–16	0–4	5th			
2000	7–18	1–3	4th			
2001	4–18	1–5	6th			
2002	7–14	2–5	5th			
2003	8–12	1–4	5th			
2004	5–16	0–5	6th			
2005	9–13	2–4	4th			
2006	3–18	1–5	5th			
2007	9–13	3–3	3rd			
2008	7–16	1–5	7th			
2009	7–12	0–5	7th			
2010	13–11	0–5	6th			
2011	9–12	2–3	4th			
2012	7–11	1–4	6th		53rd singles	
2013	4–17	2–3	4th			
2014	14–13	2–4	5th			
2015	13–11	4–1	2nd		53rd doubles	
2016	17–5	5–0	1st	NCAA Division I first round	58th team, 69th doubles	SLC regular and tournament champions, NCAA Division I first round, 61st ITA overall team ranking, 8th ITA Team Regional ranking
2017	17–8	4–1	1st	NCAA Division I first round		SLC regular and tournament champions, NCAA Division I first round, 8th ITA Team Regional ranking
2018	10–14	2–3	4th	NCAA Division I first round		SLC tournament champions, NCAA Division I first round, 10th ITA Team Regional ranking
2019	6–18	1–4	6th			
2020	7–12	0–0				
2021	11–9	3–2	3rd			
2022	17–8	6–0	1st			WAC regular season champion

== Head coaching history ==
#	Name	Years	Record
Won-Loss Records
1	Lewis Hilley	1952—1962	137–15–4
2	Bill Tipton	1963—1964	21–7–1
3	Dan Mullin	1965—1966	22–6–3
4	Pete Yates	1967—1970	32–29–5
5	Ron Westbrooks	1971—1987	203–186–0
6	Al Driscole *	1988—1991	?–?–?
7	Tim Calhoun	1992—1994	8–41–0
8	Claire Pollard	1995—1998	36–42–0
9	Tom Lowry	1999—2000	11–34–0
10	David Wong	2001—2006	32–73–0
11	Aldrin Campos	2007	9–13–0
12	Greg Davis	2008—2010	27–39–0
13	Scott Shankles	2011—	133–192–0

- Records not available

== Postseason results ==
=== NCAA Division I ===
Year	Round	Opponent	Result/Score
Results
2016	First Round	Texas	L 0–4
2017	First Round	Baylor	L 0–4
2018	First Round	Texas A&M	L 0–4

== Lamar Lady Cardinals tennis ==
Lamar Lady Cardinals
- University: Lamar University
- Athletic director: Jeff O'Malley
- Head coach: David Wong (17th season)
- Conference: Southland
- Location: Beaumont, Texas, US
- Home Court: Thompson Family Tennis Center (Capacity: 400)
- Nickname: Cardinals
- Colors: Red and white

NCAA Tournament championships
- *NAIAW Doubles Championship - 1973; *TAIAW Doubles Championship - 1972, 1973; *TAIAW Singles Championship - 1970, 1971, 1972, 1973

NCAA Tournament appearances
- *NAIAW 1970*, 1971*, 1972*, 1973*; NCAA 2008

Conference Tournament championships
- Southland 2008

Conference regular season champions
- American South 1988 Southland 1983, 1985

The Lamar Lady Cardinals tennis team is the women's team representing Lamar University in the sport of tennis. The team started competition around 1968. The Lady Cardinals compete in NCAA Division I's Southland Conference. Home matches are at the 16 court on campus Thompson Family Tennis Center in Beaumont, Texas. David Wong has been the Lady Cardinals' head coach since the 2001 season.

The team competed with the Association of Intercollegiate Athletics for Women until 1981 when it began competition as an NCAA Division I team. In AIAW competition, the doubles team of Cathy Beene and Linda Rupert won the National AIAW Doubles championship in 1973. Beene and Rupert also captured four Texas AIAW Singles championships (Beene – 1970, 71 and Rupert – 1972, 73) and two Texas AIAW Doubles championships (1972, 73). In NCAA competition, the Lady Cardinals have won two Southland Conference championships (1983 and 1985), one Southland Conference tournament championship (2008), and one American South Conference championship (1988).

== Honors ==
Southland Conference Player of the Year

- Andrea Martinez – 2006
- Mariaryeni Gutiérrez – 2010
- Katya Lapayeva – 2016

Southland Conference Newcomer of the Year

- Pamela Martinez – 2006
- Carolina Salas – 2012

Southland Conference Freshman of the Year

- Kaltrina Harbuzi – 2007
- Mariaryeni Gutiérrez – 2008

Southland Conference Coach of the Year

- Ron Westbrooks – 1973, '75, '76, '82
- Scott Shankles – 2016

== Lamar Lady Cardinal Career Coaching Records ==
Coach	Seasons	Overall record	Winning Percentage
Career Coaching Records
Pat Park	1968–75	not available	
Raye Holt	1976–77	6–8	.429
Linda Thomas	1978–80	N/A	N/A
Debbie Gheezi	1981–88	112–93	.546
Carol Gore	1989–91	14–32	.304
Tim Calhoun	1992–93	14–23	.378
Claire Pollard	1994–98	62–39	.613
Tom Lowry	1999–2000	22–28	.440
David Wong	2001–present	205–181	.531
Overall	46 Seasons	435–404	.518

Note: Overall is misstated since it is based only on available records. Records for at least seven seasons of the program beginning are unavailable.

== Thompson Family Tennis Center ==
Thompson Family Tennis Center
- Interactive map of Thompson Family Tennis Center
- Former names: Lamar Tennis Facility (pre 2009)
- Location: E Virginia Street, Beaumont, Texas
- Coordinates: 30°02′32.3″N 94°04′42.3″W
- Owner: Lamar University
- Operator: Lamar University
- Seating type: bleacher, bench
- Capacity: Stadium courts: 400; Remaining courts 600 plus
- Type: Stadium
- Event: Tennis matches
- Scoreboard: electronic, digital

Construction
- Renovated: 2009

Tenants
- Lamar Cardinals tennis Lamar Lady Cardinals tennis

The Thompson Family Tennis Center was completely renovated in 2009. The center has 16 outside courts including 5 stadium courts with covered seating for 400. Additional seating for over 600 spectators is provided for the remaining eleven courts. The center features an electronic scoreboard capable of scoring six matches at once. The tennis support building includes a pro shop/meeting room, locker rooms, restrooms, and storage room.

Thompson Family Tennis Center
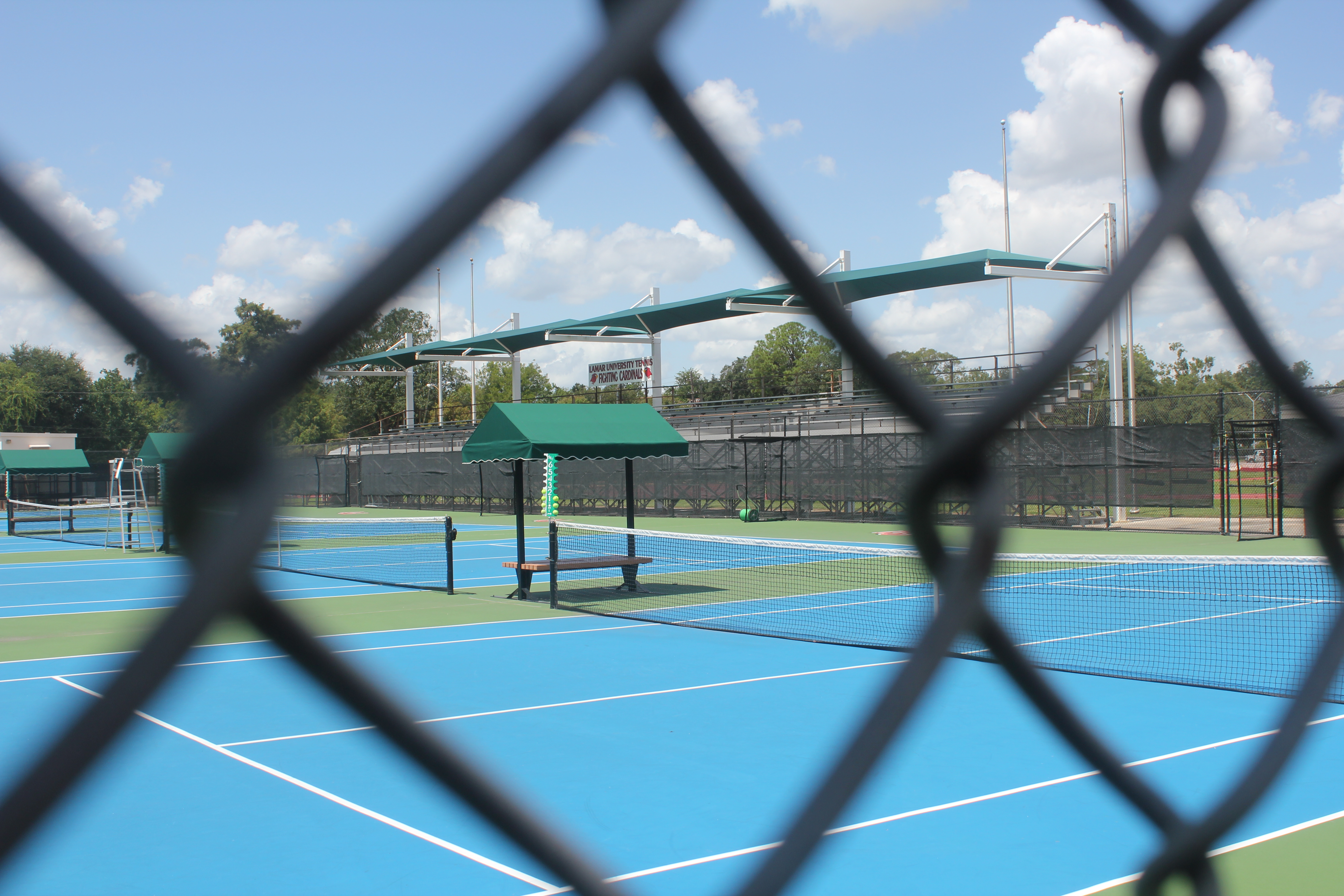
Tennis Courts toward the grandstands

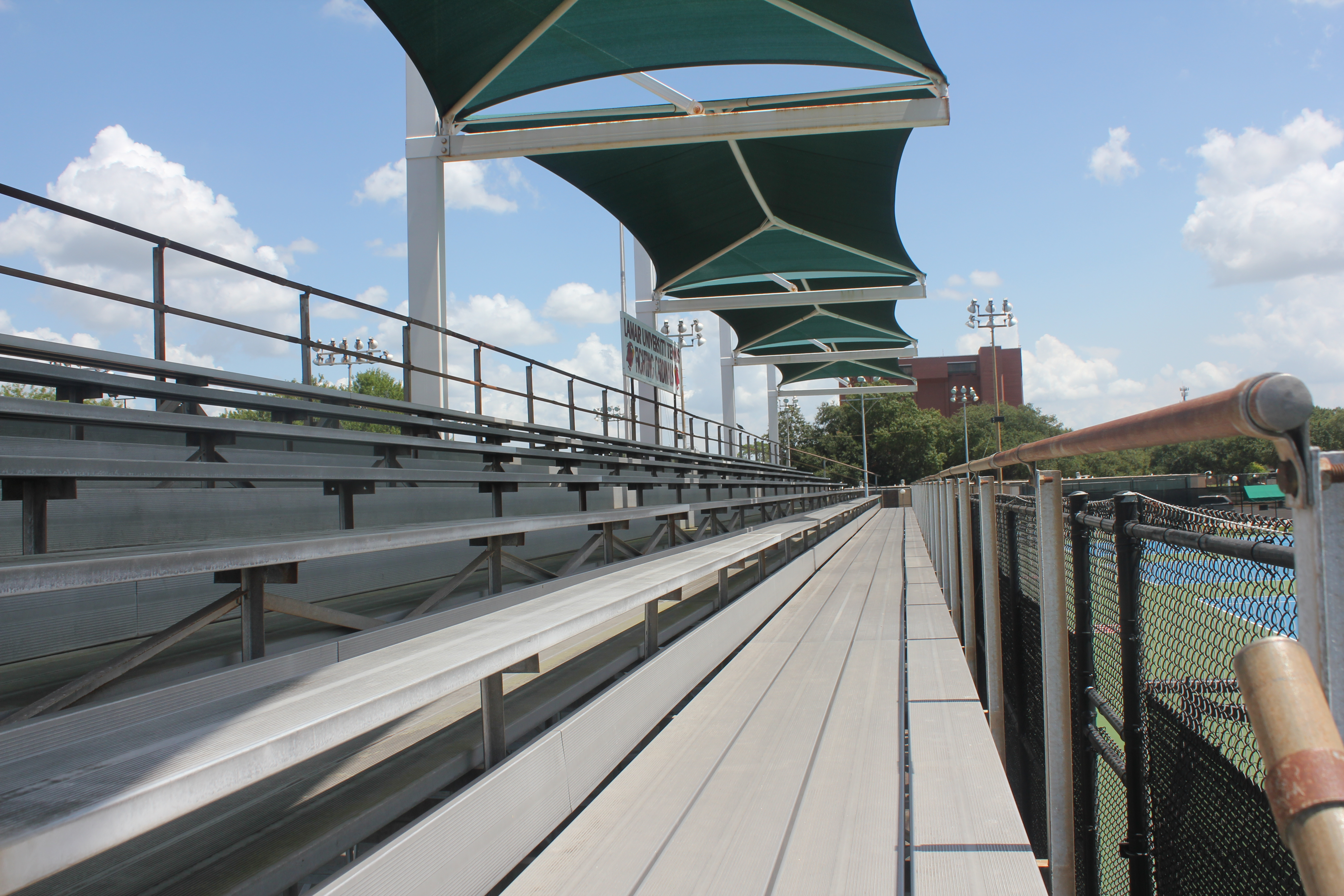
Tennis Courts – View of the grandstands
