= Big Red (Lamar University) =

Mascot of the sports teams at Lamar University

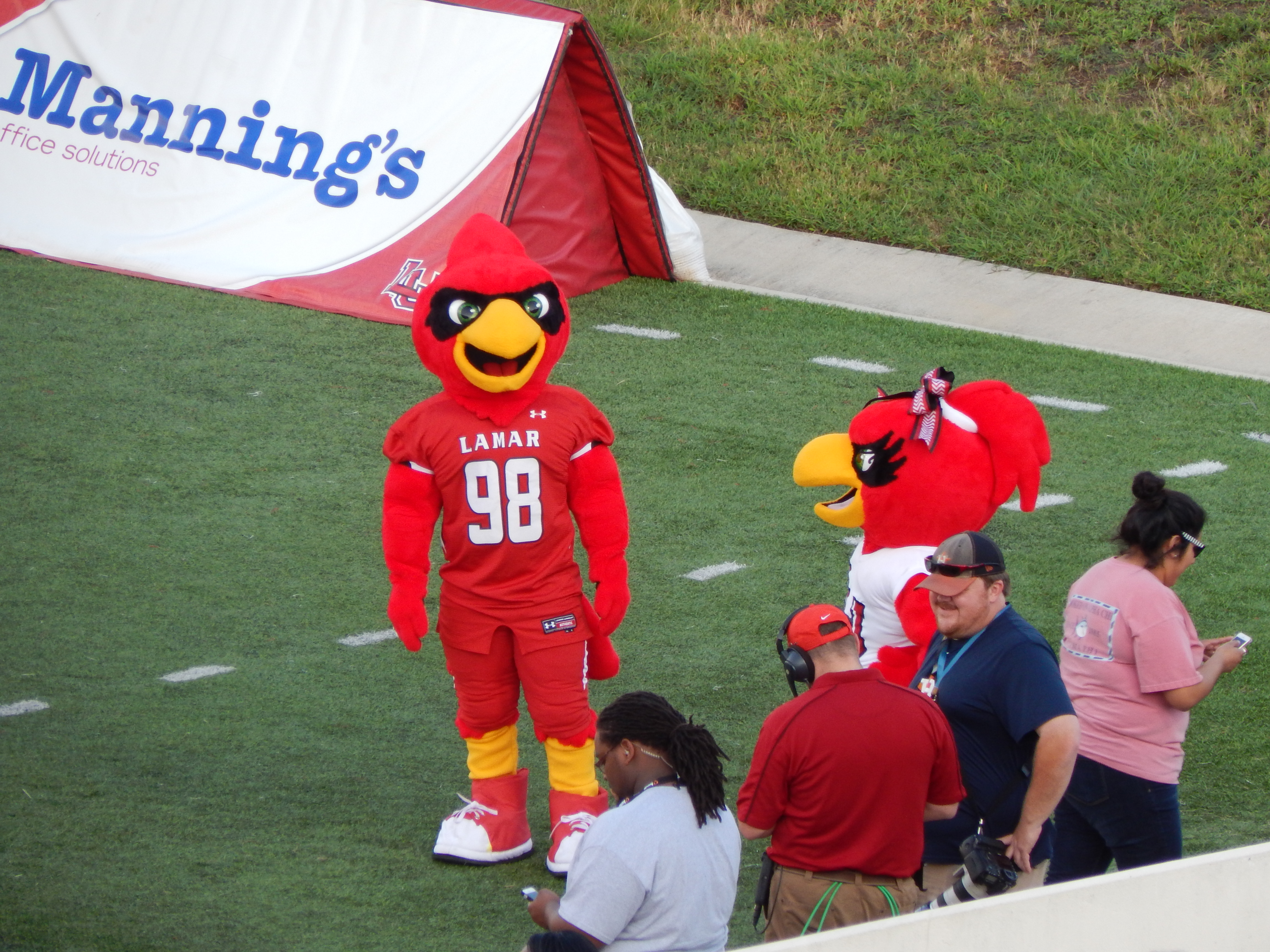
- Big Red and Lu before the game
- University: Lamar University
- Conference: Southland
- Description: Cardinal
- Origin of name: John Gray
- First seen: 1932
- Related mascot(s): Lu

Big Red is the mascot of the sports teams at Lamar University, a Cardinal with Red plumage.

== History ==
In 1932 South Park Junior College held a contest to determine a new school name. A new school name was needed because the school began serving students from across the region. When the contest results yielded the name Lamar College, John Gray: athletic director, football coach, and eventually university president changed the school mascot from the Brahamas to the Cardinals. Shortly after this change Big Red was born. Female character Lu joined in 2012.
