= Dave Smith (pitcher, born 1957) =

American baseball player (born 1957)

- Pitcher
- Born: August 30, 1957 (age 68); Tomball, Texas, U.S.
- Batted: Right Threw: Right

MLB debut
- September 18, 1984, for the California Angels

Last MLB appearance
- September 14, 1985, for the California Angels

MLB statistics
- Win–loss record: 0–0
- Earned run average: 9.00
- Strikeouts: 3
- Stats at Baseball Reference

Teams
- California Angels (1984–1985)

David Wayne Smith (born August 30, 1957) is an American former professional baseball pitcher. Smith pitched in five games in Major League Baseball (MLB) in 1984 and 1985 for the California Angels. He played baseball in college for the Lamar University Cardinals.
