= Micah Hoffpauir =

American baseball player (born 1980)

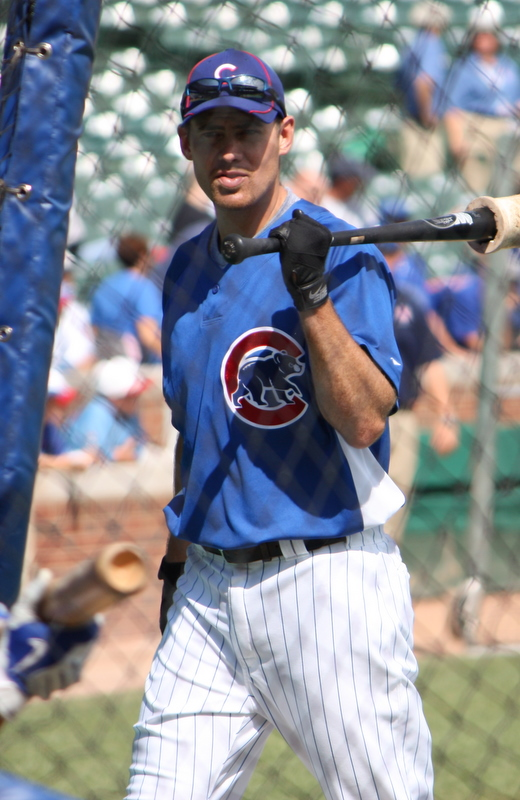
- Hoffpauir with the Cubs in 2010
- Outfielder / First baseman
- Born: March 1, 1980 (age 46); Fort Worth, Texas, U.S.
- Batted: Left Threw: Left

Professional debut
- MLB: May 18, 2008, for the Chicago Cubs
- NPB: May 7, 2011, for the Hokkaido Nippon Ham Fighters

Last appearance
- MLB: October 2, 2010, for the Chicago Cubs
- NPB: August 29, 2013, for the Hokkaido Nippon Ham Fighters

MLB statistics
- Batting average: .251
- Home runs: 12
- Runs batted in: 48

NPB statistics
- Batting average: .225
- Home runs: 31
- Runs batted in: 88
- Stats at Baseball Reference

Teams
- Chicago Cubs (2008–2010); Hokkaido Nippon Ham Fighters (2011–2013)

James Micah Hoffpauir (born March 1, 1980) is an American former professional baseball first baseman and outfielder. He was drafted in 2000 by the Tampa Bay Devil Rays in the 44th round (1,301st overall), but he did not sign and returned to college. The Cubs selected him in the 13th round (393rd overall) of the 2002 draft. He is a distant cousin of former Major Leaguer Jarrett Hoffpauir.

== Early life ==
A six-foot three-inch left-hander, Hoffpauir attended Jacksonville High School in Jacksonville, Texas. He attended Lamar University in Beaumont, Texas, where he played for the Cardinals, where he holds a school record in nearly every major offensive category. He graduated in 2001.

== Playing career ==
=== Chicago Cubs ===
After being drafted by the Cubs, Hoffpauir was sent to the Single-A Boise Hawks, where he batted .301 with 10 home runs and 41 runs batted in. His good play caused the Cubs to send him to their other Single-A team, the Daytona Cubs, in 2003. There he batted only .254 with 8 home runs and 58 RBIs. In 2004, Hoffpauir made the leap from Single-A Daytona to Triple-A Iowa, where he played in only one game before being sent down to the Double-A West Tenn Diamond Jaxx. He hit 11 home runs and drove in 75 runs in 94 games with the Diamond Jaxx. In 2005, Hoffpauir began the season with Triple-A Iowa, where hit only 3 home runs and drove in 47 runs in 119 games, and batted .268. His poor performance resulted in him being sent back down to Double-A West Tenn for the remainder of the season. He began the 2006 campaign with West Tenn, but was moved up to Triple-A Iowa, where he had his best offensive production year of his career with 22 home runs and 80 RBIs to go along with .267 average. With all-star Derrek Lee at first base on the major league team and no openings in the outfield available, Hoffpauir returned to Triple-A Iowa for the 2007 season. On July 4, Hoffpauir was placed on the disabled list with a right knee injury. Hoffpauir went on the DL hitting .316 with 16 home runs and 73 RBIs in 82 games.

After a short debut with the Cubs, he was returned to Iowa, where he tied a Pacific Coast League record with four home runs in a single game in a 15-3 Cubs victory over the Round Rock Express on August 9, 2008. The four home runs came on his first four out of five at-bats. On September 25, Hoffpauir went 5 for 5 with 2 home runs against the New York Mets.

Hoffpauir was called up to the Chicago Cubs on May 18, 2008, to replace an injured Daryle Ward. He made his major league debut that day, pinch-hitting for Jason Marquis and striking out against Pittsburgh Pirates reliever John Grabow. He had 80 plate appearances, with excellent results: .342 AVG, .400 OBP, and .534 SLG. He was then returned to Iowa.

In the 2009 MLB season, Hoffpauir was a PH due to Lee's struggles at first and through April 15 had success with 2 hits in 4 at-bats with 2 RBIs. He also played right field due to the absence of Milton Bradley, hitting his first home run of the season on April 21 at home against the Cincinnati Reds. As a regular, he was hitting .314 as of May 20. However, in the next game, he went 0-4 with four strike outs and went on to hit just .209 the rest of the season for a .239 season average. Hoffpauir started 2010 with the AAA Iowa Cubs. In August 2010, he rejoined the Cubs but hit just .173 playing just the final two months of the season.

=== Hokkaido Nippon Ham Fighters ===
Hoffpauir signed with the Hokkaido Nippon-Ham Fighters in 2011. In three seasons, he hit .222 (6 HRs, 38 RBI), .247 (14 HRs, 37 RBI), and .186 (5 HR, 15 RBI). In September 2013, Nippon announced it would not bring Hoffpauir back for the 2014 season.

== Personal life ==
In 2009, Hoffpauir played himself in the TBS comedy My Boys. He appeared in the final episode of the show's third season, entitled "Spring Training."
