= Colin Ridgway =

Australian-born American football player (1937–1993)

No. 88
- Position: Punter

Personal information
- Born: 19 February 1937; Melbourne, Australia
- Died: 13 May 1993 (aged 56); University Park, Texas, U.S.
- Listed height: 6 ft 5 in (1.96 m)
- Listed weight: 211 lb (96 kg)

Career information
- College: Lamar
- NFL draft: 1965: undrafted

Career history
- Dallas Cowboys (1965); Savannah Chiefs (1966); Knoxville SOK (1966); Dallas County Rockets (1966)

Career NFL statistics
- Games played: 3
- Punts: 13
- Stats at Pro Football Reference

Colin Edwin Ridgway (19 February 1937 – 13 May 1993) was an American football punter distinguished as being the first Australian to play in the National Football League (NFL). He also competed in the high jump at the 1956 Summer Olympics.

== Early years ==
In Aussie rules, Ridgway played U19s for Carlton and then in their reserves in 1955.

He was a high jumper who competed at the 1956 Olympic Games (where he was the youngest high jumper) and the 1958 Commonwealth Games for Australia. He had also competed in the Australian Open Track and Field Championships from 1955/56 to 1959/60. Ridgway failed to make the 1960 Australian Olympic team and so accepted an offer of a track and field scholarship to Lamar Tech (now Lamar University). In 1961, he became the first Commonwealth athlete to clear 7 foot in the high jump.

== Professional career ==
Even though he had never played an official American football game, he was discovered by the Dallas Cowboys and signed as an undrafted free agent to their 1965 team. During the preseason, he played a key role in the beating of the Green Bay Packers. He started the year on the taxi squad, before being promoted to the regular roster on 3 November.

It turned out that the running drop-kicks that were commonly used at that time in Aussie rules did not translate well into the American game. On 24 August 1966, he was waived and at the request of the Cowboys, he accepted to play with the Savannah Chiefs of the North American Football League, in order to gain more experience. During the 1966 NAFL season, he was also a member of the Knoxville SOK and the Dallas County Rockets.

== Personal life ==
Up until his death in 1993, Ridgway had been married to his wife Joan Jackson for the last 15 years. During the 1960s, he was engaged to an American model named Helen Harrison.

== Death ==
Ridgway was murdered at his University Park, Texas, home in 1993. Although Kenneth Bicking Jr. was arrested as a probable suspect in 1996, the case still remains unsolved to date.

A man publicly suspected by authorities as a killer-for-hire in Ridgway's murder was convicted on 4 September 2014 in Florida of a separate violent crime that happened the year before the murder. Kenneth Alfred Bicking III was found guilty of armed sexual battery and kidnapping with a weapon, according to the Florida State Attorney's office. The maximum sentence is life in prison. Prosecutors said Bicking entered the victim's home in April 1992 without her permission, showed a gun, tied her up and put tape over her eyes and mouth before sexually assaulting her. Bicking was charged after new DNA technology was used in a follow-up investigation in 2011. Police in Dallas theorized that Bicking was hired by his father and Ridgway's widow to carry out the 1993 killing.

== See also ==
- List of unsolved murders (1980–1999)
