= Adrian Caldwell =

American basketball player (born 1966)

Personal information
- Born: July 4, 1966 (age 60) Falls County, Texas, U.S.
- Listed height: 6 ft 8 in (2.03 m)
- Listed weight: 265 lb (120 kg)

Career information
- High school: West Oso (Corpus Christi, Texas)
- College: SMU (1986–1987); Lamar (1988–1989)
- NBA draft: 1989: undrafted
- Playing career: 1989–2000
- Position: Power forward
- Number: 44, 50, 45, 51

Career history
- 1989–1991: Houston Rockets
- 1991–1993: Pallacanestro Cantú
- 1993–1994: Kleenex Pistoia
- 1994: Houston Rockets
- 1994–1995: Sioux Falls Skyforce
- 1995: Fenerbahçe
- 1995–1996: Indiana Pacers
- 1996: New Jersey Nets
- 1997: Philadelphia 76ers
- 1997: Dallas Mavericks
- 1997: Rockford Lightning
- 1997–1998: La Crosse Bobcats
- 1998: CB Valladolid
- 2000: Atenas
- 2000: Toros de Aragua

Career NBA statistics
- Points: 390 (2.0 ppg)
- Rebounds: 496 (2.5 rpg)
- Steals: 56 (0.3 spg)
- Stats at NBA.com
- Stats at Basketball Reference

Adrian Bernard Caldwell (born July 4, 1966) is a retired American professional basketball player, who had a career in the National Basketball Association (NBA) from 1989 to 1997.

An undersized center (2.05 m), Caldwell attended Southern Methodist University and Lamar University, both in Texas.

Undrafted in 1989, he then played professionally for five NBA teams including the Houston Rockets, Indiana Pacers, New Jersey Nets, Philadelphia 76ers, and Dallas Mavericks.

== Career statistics ==
Legend
GP	Games played	GS	Games started	MPG	Minutes per game
FG%	Field goal percentage	3P%	3-point field goal percentage	FT%	Free throw percentage
RPG	Rebounds per game	APG	Assists per game	SPG	Steals per game
BPG	Blocks per game	PPG	Points per game	**Bold**	Career high

=== NBA ===
==== Regular season ====
Year	Team	GP	GS	MPG	FG%	3P%	FT%	RPG	APG	SPG	BPG	PPG
1989–90	Houston	**51**	0	6.5	.553	–	.464	2.1	.1	.2	**.4**	1.9
1990–91	Houston	42	0	8.2	.422	.000	.412	2.4	.2	**.5**	.2	1.8
1994–95	Houston	7	0	4.3	.250	–	.500	1.4	.0	.1	.0	.7
1995–96	Indiana	**51**	**1**	6.4	**.554**	–	.500	2.2	.1	.2	.1	2.2
1996–97	New Jersey	18	0	11.3	.286	.000	**.529**	3.1	**.3**	.4	.1	1.6
1996–97	Philadelphia	27	0	**13.5**	.526	–	.364	**4.1**	**.3**	.3	.3	**2.7**
1997–98	Dallasa	1	0	3.0	–	–	–	.0	.0	.0	.0	.0
Career		197	1	8.1	.485	.000	.453	2.5	.2	.3	.2	2.0

==== Playoffs ====
Year	Team	GP	GS	MPG	FG%	3P%	FT%	RPG	APG	SPG	BPG	PPG
1990	Houston	**1**	0	1.0	–	–	–	.0	.0	.0	.0	.0
1996	Indiana	**1**	0	**3.0**	**1.000**	–	–	**1.0**	.0	.0	.0	**2.0**
Career		2	0	2.0	1.000	–	–	.5	.0	.0	.0	1.0
