= Jennifer Wyatt =

Canadian professional golfer (born 1965)

Personal information
- Full name: Jennifer Noel Wyatt
- Nationality: Canada
- Born: December 10, 1965 (age 60) Vancouver, British Columbia
- Height: 5 ft 7 in (170 cm)

Career
- Sport: Golf
- College: Lamar University
- Status: Professional
- Former tours: LPGA Tour; ALPG Tour
- Professional wins: 9

Number of wins by tour
- LPGA Tour: 1
- WPGA Tour of Australasia: 1
- Other: 7

Best results in LPGA major championships
- Chevron Championship: T48: 1996
- Women's PGA C'ship: T20: 1997
- U.S. Women's Open: CUT: 1988, 1992
- du Maurier Classic: T31: 1994
- Women's British Open: DNP

Jennifer Noel Wyatt (born December 10, 1965) is a Canadian professional golfer who played on the LPGA Tour.

== Early life ==
Wyatt was born in Vancouver, British Columbia and starting playing golf at an early age in Richmond, British Columbia out of the Quilchena Golf & Country Club.

== Amateur career ==
In 1983, she was the medalist at the 1983 Women's Western Junior Golf Championship and in 1984 she was the British Columbia Junior champion and ranked as the second best junior golfer in Canada. From 1985 to 1987, she was the number one ranked player in Canada. In 1987, she was a member of the gold medal-winning team at the Commonwealth Games in Christchurch, New Zealand.

She attended Lamar University on a full scholarship and played on the Lamar golf team in the NCAA for five years before graduating in 1988 with a degree in Graphic Design.

== Professional career ==
In 1989, Wyatt joined the LPGA Tour after qualifying on her first try, and played on tour until 1998. She won one tournament in 1992. During her 10 years on tour she won one tournament, made US$372,471, and was the ranked the 7th best putter in 1996 and the 4th best in sand saves in the same year.

In the off-season, she competed on the ALPG Tour (Australian Ladies Professional Golf Tour) from 1988 to 1995. She had one win on the ALPG tour and nine top-10 finishes in her eight seasons on the tour. Her career low round in tournament play is a 66 at the 1991 Orix Hawaiian Ladies Open at Ko Olina Golf Club in Kapolei, Hawaii.

She has worked as a broadcast commentator for both CBC Sports and CTV Sports during televised golf events.

In 2003, she finished in first place in the 2003 BMO Financial Group Canadian Women's Tour Order of Merit.

== Professional wins (9) ==
=== LPGA Tour wins (1) ===
No.	Date	Tournament	Winning score	Margin of victory	Runner-up
1	May 10, 1992	Crestar-Farm Fresh Classic	−8 (70-68-70=208)	2 strokes	(United States) Donna Andrews

=== ALPG Tour wins (1) ===
- 1991 Heart Health Women's Open

=== Other wins (7) ===
- 2001 BC PGA Women's Championship
- 2002 BC PGA Women's Championship
- 2004 BC PGA Women's Championship
- 2005 BC PGA Women's Championship
- 2006 BC PGA Women's Championship
- 2009 BC PGA Women's Championship, Washington State Women's Open
