= Arkansas State Red Wolves men's basketball statistical leaders =

The Arkansas State Red Wolves men's basketball statistical leaders are individual statistical leaders of the Arkansas State Red Wolves men's basketball program in various categories, including points, rebounds, assists, steals, and blocks. Within those areas, the lists identify single-game, single-season, and career leaders. The Red Wolves represent Arkansas State University in the NCAA's Sun Belt Conference.

Arkansas State began competing in intercollegiate basketball in 1926. However, the school's record book does not generally list records from before the 1950s, as records from before this period are often incomplete and inconsistent. Since scoring was much lower in this era, and teams played much fewer games during a typical season, it is likely that few or no players from this era would appear on these lists anyway.

The NCAA did not officially record assists as a stat until the 1983–84 season, and blocks and steals until the 1985–86 season, but Arkansas State's record books includes players in these stats before these seasons. These lists are updated through the end of the 2020–21 season.

== Scoring ==
Career
Rk	Player	Points	Seasons
1	Jerry Rook	2,153	1961–62 1962–63 1963–64 1964–65
2	John Dickson	1,891	1963–64 1964–65 1965–66 1966–67
3	John Tate	1,776	1985–86 1986–87 1987–88 1988–89
4	Marquis Eaton	1,654	2017–18 2018–19 2019–20 2020–21 2021–22
5	Don Scaife	1,652	1972–73 1973–74 1974–75
6	Caleb Fields	1,622	2019–20 2020–21 2021–22 2022–23 2023–24
7	John Belcher	1,544	1968–69 1969–70 1970–71 1971–72
8	Dan Henderson	1,543	1973–74 1974–75 1975–76 1976–77
9	Chico Fletcher	1,465	1996–97 1997–98 1998–99 1999–00
10	Maurice Miller	1,463	1947–48 1948–49 1949–50

Season
Rk	Player	Points	Season
1	Ty Cockfield	716	2018–19
2	Adrian Banks	695	2006–07
3	Don Scaife	678	1974–75
4	Jerry Rook	633	1963–64
5	Jerry Rook	596	1962–63
6	Dan Henderson	583	1976–77
7	Jeff Clifton	574	1993–94
8	John Dickson	565	1966–67
9	John Tate	562	1987–88
10	John Dickson	559	1965–66

Single game
Rk	Player	Points	Season	Opponent
1	John Dickson	47	1966–67	UT Arlington
	John Dickson	47	1966–67	UT Chattanooga
3	Jeff Clifton	43	1993–94	Little Rock
	Don Scaife	43	1974–75	NE Louisiana
	Don Scaife	43	1974–75	Samford
	Jerry Rook	43	1962–63	Louisiana College
7	Dan Henderson	42	1975–76	UT Arlington
8	Tevoris Thompson	41	2002–03	Lyon College
	Maurice Miller	41	1949–50	Central Arkansas
10	Jeff Clifton	40	1993–94	Southwestern La.

== Rebounds ==
Career
Rk	Player	Rebounds	Seasons
1	John Belcher	1,166	1968–69 1969–70 1970–71 1971–72
2	John Dickson	1,139	1963–64 1964–65 1965–66 1966–67
3	Kim Adams	916	2000–01 2001–02 2002–03 2003–04
4	Dan Henderson	910	1973–74 1974–75 1975–76 1976–77
5	Jerry Rook	896	1961–62 1962–63 1963–64 1964–65
6	Brandon Peterson	886	2009–10 2010–11 2011–12 2012–13
7	Steve Brooks	862	1969–70 1970–71 1971–72 1973–74
8	John Tate	821	1985–86 1986–87 1987–88 1988–89
9	Fred Shepherd	782	1989–90 1990–91 1991–92 1992–93
10	Mike Burk	775	1964–65 1965–66 1966–67 1967–68

Season
Rk	Player	Rebounds	Season
1	John Dickson	354	1965–66
2	Norchad Omier	353	2021–22
3	Jim Ward	352	1954–55
4	Norm Vickers	343	1955–56
5	John Belcher	326	1971–72
6	Omar El-Sheikh	315	2022–23
7	John Belcher	307	1969–70
8	Brandon Peterson	301	2012–13
9	John Dickson	299	1966–67
10	Anthony Livingston	291	2014–15

Single game
Rk	Player	Rebounds	Season	Opponent
1	Jim Ward	28	1954–55	Union
2	Norchad Omier	26	2021–22	UL Monroe
	John Belcher	26	1969–70	UT Arlington
	Frank Proctor	26	1955–56	Centenary
5	Jeff Clifton	25	1993–94	Little Rock
6	Izaiyah Nelson	23	2024–25	South Alabama
	John Belcher	23	1971–72	Lamar
	John Dickson	23	1965–66	Trinity
9	Anthony Livingston	22	2015–16	LR
	Lonnie Webber	22	1972–73	Tusculum
	Steve Brooks	22	1971–72	Trinity
	John Dickson	22	1966–67	Lamar
	John Dickson	22	1966–67	Trinity
	John Dickson	22	1966–67	UT Chattanooga
	John Dickson	22	1966–67	East TN ST
	John Dickson	22	1964–65	SEMO
	Jim Ward	22	1954–55	Southwestern

== Assists ==
Career
Rk	Player	Assists	Seasons
1	Chico Fletcher	893	1996–97 1997–98 1998–99 1999–00
2	Caleb Fields	678	2019–20 2020–21 2021–22 2022–23 2023–24
3	Carl Archer	544	1985–86 1986–87 1987–88 1988–89
4	Marquis Eaton	476	2017–18 2018–19 2019–20 2020–21 2021–22
5	Odie Williams	384	1999–00 2000–01 2001–02 2002–03
	Brian Reaves	384	1989–90 1990–91 1991–92 1992–93
	Jay Hansen	384	1980–81 1981–82 1982–83 1983–84
8	Micah Marsh	363	1994–95 1995–96 1996–97 1997–98
9	Donte Thomas	323	2015–16 2016–17
	J.H. Williams	323	1972–73 1973–74 1974–75

Season
Rk	Player	Assists	Season
1	Chico Fletcher	250	1998–99
2	Chico Fletcher	240	1997–98
3	Chico Fletcher	232	1999–00
4	Carl Archer	222	1987–88
5	Caleb Fields	202	2023–24
6	Donte Thomas	177	2016–17
7	Chico Fletcher	171	1996–97
8	Terrance Ford Jr.	170	2024–25
9	Brian Reaves	163	1990–91
10	Dereke Tipler	155	2004–05

Single game
Rk	Player	Assists	Season	Opponent
1	Chico Fletcher	17	1998–99	TCU

== Steals ==
Career
Rk	Player	Steals	Seasons
1	Chico Fletcher	211	1996–97 1997–98 1998–99 1999–00
2	Carl Archer	182	1985–86 1986–87 1987–88 1988–89
3	Ed Townsel	173	2010–11 2011–12 2012–13 2013–14
4	Trey Finn	161	2009–10 2010–11 2011–12 2012–13
5	Marquis Eaton	154	2017–18 2018–19 2019–20 2020–21 2021–22
6	Kim Adams	151	2000–01 2001–02 2002–03 2003–04
7	Caleb Fields	141	2019–20 2020–21 2021–22 2022–23 2023–24
8	Antonio Harvey	139	1995–96 1996–97 1997–98 1998–99
9	Jay Hansen	133	1980–81 1981–82 1982–83 1983–84
10	Bo Brown	130	1987–88 1988–89

Season
Rk	Player	Steals	Season
1	Dereke Tipler	76	2005–06
2	Bo Brown	68	1987–88
3	Ed Townsel	66	2011–12
	Chico Fletcher	66	1998–99
5	Jeff Clifton	63	1993–94
6	Bo Brown	62	1988–89
7	Donald Boone	56	2010–11
	Shawn Morgan	56	2007–08
	Antonio Harvey	56	1998–99
10	Donald Boone	54	2008–09
	Chico Fletcher	54	1999–00
	Chico Fletcher	54	1997–98
	Dewayne McCray	54	1990–91

Single game
Rk	Player	Steals	Season	Opponent
1	Alan Smith	8	1985–86	Missouri Valley

== Blocks ==
Career
Rk	Player	Blocks	Seasons
1	Freddy Hicks	204	1995–96 1996–97 1997–98 1998–99
2	Jason Jennings	203	2000–01 2001–02
3	Brandon Peterson	163	2009–10 2010–11 2011–12 2012–13
4	Izaiyah Nelson	158	2022–23 2023–24 2024–25
5	John Tate	105	1985–86 1986–87 1987–88 1988–89
6	Norchad Omier	90	2020–21 2021–22
7	Kim Adams	77	2000–01 2001–02 2002–03 2003–04
8	Fred Shepherd	76	1989–90 1990–91 1991–92 1992–93
9	Greg Williams	75	1986–87 1987–88 1988–89 1989–90
10	Jeff Clifton	72	1992–93 1993–94

Season
Rk	Player	Blocks	Season
1	Jason Jennings	102	2000–01
2	Jason Jennings	101	2001–02
3	Izaiyah Nelson	73	2023–24
4	Freddy Hicks	65	1997–98
5	Freddy Hicks	63	1998–99
6	Brandon Peterson	61	2009–10
7	Freddy Hicks	59	1996–97
8	Eric McKinney	58	2008–09
9	Norchad Omier	57	2021–22
10	Jeff Clifton	49	1993–94

Single game
Rk	Player	Steals	Season	Opponent
1	Jason Jennings	11	2000–01	Morris Brown
