= List of Arkansas State Red Wolves men's basketball head coaches =

The following is a list of Arkansas State Red Wolves men's basketball head coaches. The Red Wolves have had 17 head coaches in their 95-season history.

Arkansas State's current head coach is Bryan Hodgson. He was hired in March 2023 to replace Mike Balado, who was fired after the 2022–23 season.

| No. | Tenure | Coach | Years | Record | Pct. |
|---|---|---|---|---|---|
| 1 | 1926–1931; 1941–1942 | Herbert Schwartz | 6 | 38–72 | .345 |
| 2 | 1931–1933 | Jack Dale | 2 | 20–15 | .571 |
| 3 | 1933–1934 | H. F. Parker | 1 | 10–5 | .667 |
| 4 | 1934–1935 | Wayne Campbell | 1 | 11–7 | .611 |
| 5 | 1935–1936 | Tommy Mills | 1 | 14–9 | .609 |
| 6 | 1936–1941 | Wendell Davis | 5 | 36–60 | .375 |
| 7 | 1944–1949 | Ike Tomlinson | 5 | 51–69 | .425 |
| 8 | 1949–1963 | John Rauth | 14 | 191–150 | .560 |
| 9 | 1963–1969 | Marvin Speight | 6 | 75–67 | .528 |
| 10 | 1969–1976 | John Rose | 7 | 91–81 | .529 |
| 11 | 1976–1984 | Marvin Adams | 8 | 111–107 | .509 |
| 12 | 1984–1995 | Nelson Catalina | 11 | 188–139 | .575 |
| 13 | 1995–2008 (Note: Dickey Nutt resigned as head coach on February 19, 2008. Shawn Forrest and Al Grushkin served as co-interim head coaches for the remainder of the season.) (Note: Arkansas State vacated 27 wins from the 2005–06 and 2006–07 seasons. Nutt's on-court record is 189–187 (.503).) | Dickey Nutt | 13 | 162–187 | .464 |
| – | 2008* | Shawn Forrest and Al Grushkin | 1 | 1–3 | .250 |
| 14 | 2008–2016 (Note: Arkansas State vacated 1 win from the 2015–16 season. Brady's on-court record is 121–129 (.484).) | John Brady | 8 | 120–129 | .482 |
| 15 | 2016–2017 | Grant McCasland | 1 | 20–12 | .625 |
| 16 | 2017–2023 | Mike Balado | 6 | 82–100 | .451 |
| 17 | 2023–present | Bryan Hodgson | 2 | 45–28 | .616 |
| Totals | | 17 coaches | 95 seasons | 1,221–1,212 | .502 |
Records updated through end of 2022–23 season * - Denotes interim head coach. Source
