= Joshua Alexander =

Josh Alexander may refer to:

- Josh Alexander (basketball) (born 1987), American basketball player
- Josh Alexander (songwriter), American songwriter and producer
- Josh Alexander (born 1987), Canadian professional wrestler

== See also ==
- Joshua W. Alexander (1852–1936), United States Secretary of Commerce of 1919–1921
