= Taylor Smith (basketball) =

American basketball player (born 1991)

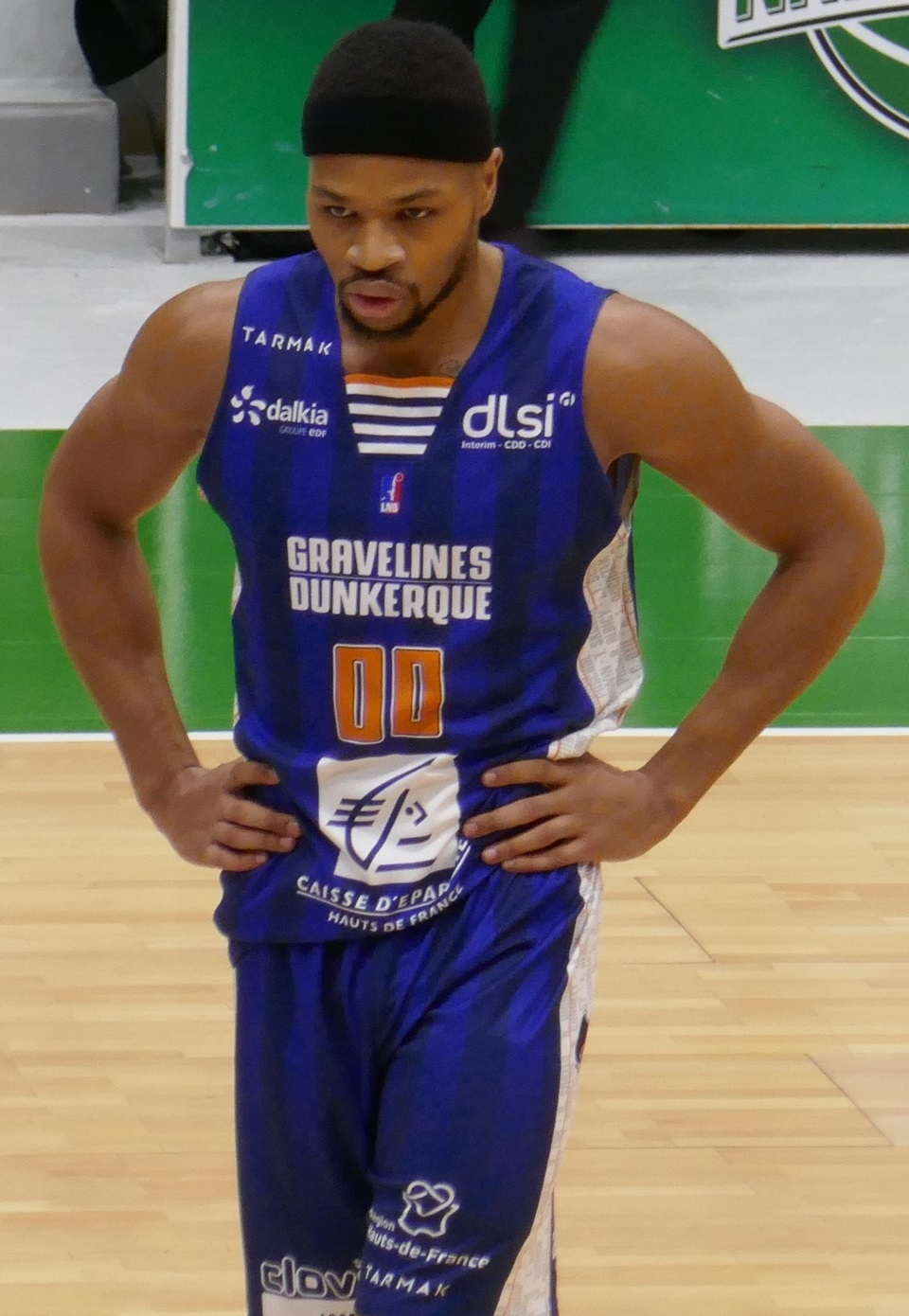

Free Agent
- Position: Center

Personal information
- Born: July 23, 1991 (age 35)
- Listed height: 6 ft 6 in (1.98 m)
- Listed weight: 215 lb (98 kg)

Career information
- High school: Clemens (Schertz, Texas)
- College: McLennan CC (2009–2011); Stephen F. Austin (2011–2013)
- NBA draft: 2013: undrafted
- Playing career: 2013–present

Career history
- 2013–2015: Kolossos Rodou
- 2015–2017: Ravenna Piero Manetti
- 2017–2019: BCM Gravelines
- 2019–2020: Nanterre 92
- 2020–2022: Mornar
- 2022–2023: Scaligera Verona

Career highlights
- 2× Italian Second Division blocks leader (2016, 2017); Pro A blocks leader (2018); Adriatic League blocks leader (2020); AP Honorable mention All-American (2013); Southland Player of the Year (2013); First-team All-Southland (2013)

Taylor Smith (born July 23, 1991) is an American basketball player. He played college basketball for Stephen F. Austin State University.

== College career ==
Smith, a 6'6" forward from Schertz, Texas, played two seasons at McLennan Community College before enrolling at Stephen F. Austin (SFA). As a senior in the 2012–13 season, Smith led NCAA Division I in field goal percentage after converting 69.4% of his attempts. He averaged 15.7 points, 9.2 rebounds and 2.8 blocked shots per game and at the end of the season was named the Southland Conference Player of the Year. A few weeks later, Smith was also named an honorable mention All-American by the Associated Press.

== Professional career ==
On June 24, 2019, he has signed a contract with Nanterre 92 of the LNB Pro A. Smith averaged 7.8 points, 4.7 rebounds and 1 block per game in 2019-20.

On May 6, 2020, he signed with Mornar of the ABA League. After contributing 22 points and 6 rebounds in a victory over KK Krka, Smith was named league player of the week on November 10.

On August 4, 2022, he has signed with Scaligera Verona of the LBA.
