= 2021 NBA G League draft (January) =

General information
- Sport: Basketball
- Date: January 11, 2021
- Location: Zoom

Overview
- League: NBA
- First selection: Admiral Schofield, Greensboro Swarm

The January 2021 NBA G League draft was the 20th draft of the NBA G League. The draft, originally scheduled to be held in October 2020 prior to the 2020–21 G League season, was postponed until January 11, 2021, due to concerns caused by the COVID-19 pandemic. The 2020–21 season was also delayed, instead starting in February 2021.

Admiral Schofield was selected by the Greensboro Swarm with the first overall pick. The draft lasted three rounds and was limited to only the 17 teams who were going to be playing in the "G League Bubble" in Orlando, Florida.

== Key ==
Pos.	G	F	C
Position	Guard	Forward	Center

^	Denotes player who has been selected to (an) NBA G League International Challenge Teams(s)
*	Denotes player who has been selected to (an) NBA G League International Challenge Team(s) and was also selected in an NBA draft
†	Denotes player who was also selected in an NBA Draft

== Draft ==
=== First round ===
Pick	Player	Pos.	Nationality	Team	College/Country
1	Admiral Schofield^{†}	F/G	United States	Greensboro Swarm	Tennessee
2	Freddie Gillespie	F/C	United States	Memphis Hustle	Baylor
3	Antonio Blakeney	G	United States	Canton Charge	LSU
4	Allonzo Trier	G	United States	Iowa Wolves	Arizona
5	Tahjere McCall	G	United States	Lakeland Magic	Tennessee State
6	Anthony Lamb	F	United States	Canton Charge	Vermont
7	Zavier Simpson	G	United States	Oklahoma City Blue	Michigan
8	D. J. Hogg	F	United States	Lakeland Magic	Texas A&M
9	Justin Patton^{†}	C	United States	Westchester Knicks	Creighton
10	Armoni Brooks	G	United States	Rio Grande Valley Vipers	Houston
11	Kevon Harris	G/F	United States	Raptors 905	Stephen F. Austin
12	Jarron Cumberland	G	United States	Rio Grande Valley Vipers	Cincinnati
13	Vincent Edwards^{†}	F	United States	Oklahoma City Blue	Purdue
14	Jonathan Kasibabu	F	Republic of the Congo	Austin Spurs	Fairfield
15	Gary Payton II	G	United States	Raptors 905	Oregon State
16	Anthony Cowan Jr.	G	United States	Memphis Hustle	Maryland
17	Dakarai Tucker	G	United States	Iowa Wolves	Utah
18	—	—	—	Salt Lake City Stars*	—

=== Second round ===
Pick	Player	Pos.	Nationality	Team	College/Country
1	Jemerrio Jones	F	United States	Delaware Blue Coats	New Mexico State
2	Oshae Brissett	F/G	Canada	Fort Wayne Mad Ants	Syracuse
3	—	—	—	Westchester Knicks*	—
4	—	—	—	Iowa Wolves*	—
5	—	—	—	Long Island Nets*	—
6	—	—	—	Agua Caliente Clippers*	—
7	Quincy McKnight	G	United States	Fort Wayne Mad Ants	Seton Hall
8	—	—	—	Agua Caliente Clippers*	—
9	Selom Mawugbe	F	United States	Santa Cruz Warriors	Azusa Pacific
10	—	—	—	Raptors 905*	—
11	—	—	—	Memphis Hustle*	—
12	Anthony Mathis	G	United States	Austin Spurs	Oregon
13	—	—	—	Erie BayHawks*	—
14	—	—	—	Greensboro Swarm*	—
15	Kaleb Johnson	G	United States	Austin Spurs	Georgetown
16	—	—	—	Santa Cruz Warriors*	—
17	—	—	—	Memphis Hustle*	—
18	Rob Edwards	G	United States	Oklahoma City Blue	Arizona State
19	—	—	—	Salt Lake City Stars*	—

=== Third round ===
Pick	Player	Pos.	Nationality	Team	College/Country
1	—	—	—	Greensboro Swarm*	—
2	—	—	—	Erie BayHawks*	—
3	—	—	—	Westchester Knicks*	—
4	Braxton Key	G	United States	Delaware Blue Coats	Virginia
5	—	—	—	Iowa Wolves*	—
6	—	—	—	Long Island Nets*	—
7	—	—	—	Oklahoma City Blue*	—
8	—	—	—	Fort Wayne Mad Ants*	—
9	—	—	—	Canton Charge*	—
10	—	—	—	Raptors 905*	—
11	—	—	—	Delaware Blue Coats*	—
12	—	—	—	Lakeland Magic*	—
13	—	—	—	Memphis Hustle*	—
14	—	—	—	Canton Charge*	—
15	—	—	—	Raptors 905*	—

*Cannot make pick
