= Southland Conference Men's Basketball Player of the Year =

US basketball award

- Awarded for: the most outstanding basketball player in the Southland Conference
- Country: United States

History
- First award: 1964
- Most recent: Keon Thompson, Stephen F. Austin

The Southland Conference Men's Basketball Player of the Year is an award given to the Southland Conference's (SLC) most outstanding player. The award was first given following the conference's inaugural basketball season of 1963–64. Five players have won the award two times: Jerry Rook, Larry Jeffries, Andrew Toney, Ryan Stuart and Thomas Walkup. No player has ever won three times. McNeese has the most all-time winners with ten. Among current SLC members, four have never had a winner: Houston Christian and Incarnate Word, both of which joined in 2013; East Texas A&M, which joined in 2022; and UTRGV, which joined in 2024.

== Key ==
†	Co-Players of the Year
*	Awarded a national player of the year award that same season: Helms Foundation College Basketball Player of the Year (1904–05 to 1978–79); UPI College Basketball Player of the Year (1954–55 to 1995–96); Oscar Robertson Trophy (1958–59 to present); Naismith College Player of the Year (1968–69 to present); John R. Wooden Award (1976–77 to present)
Player (X)	Denotes the number of times the player has been awarded the Southland Player of the Year award at that point

== Winners ==
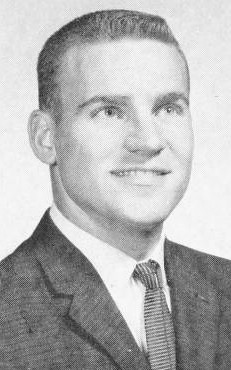
Jerry Rook, Arkansas State, 1964 and 1965

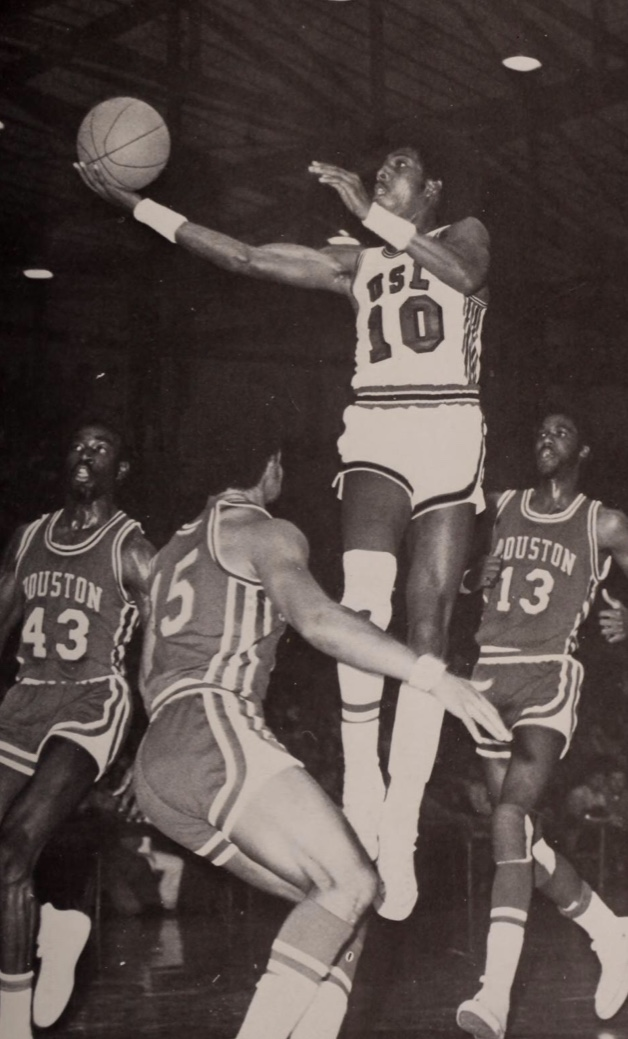
Bo Lamar, Louisiana, 1972

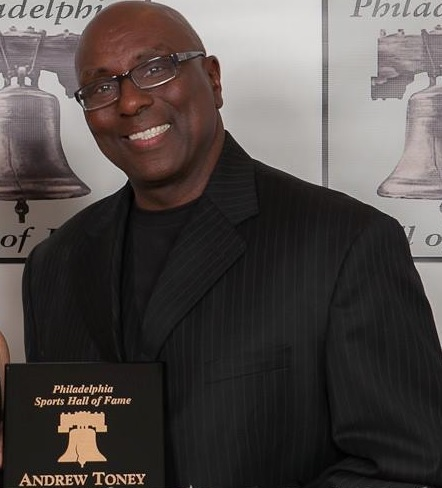
Andrew Toney, Louisiana, 1978 and 1980

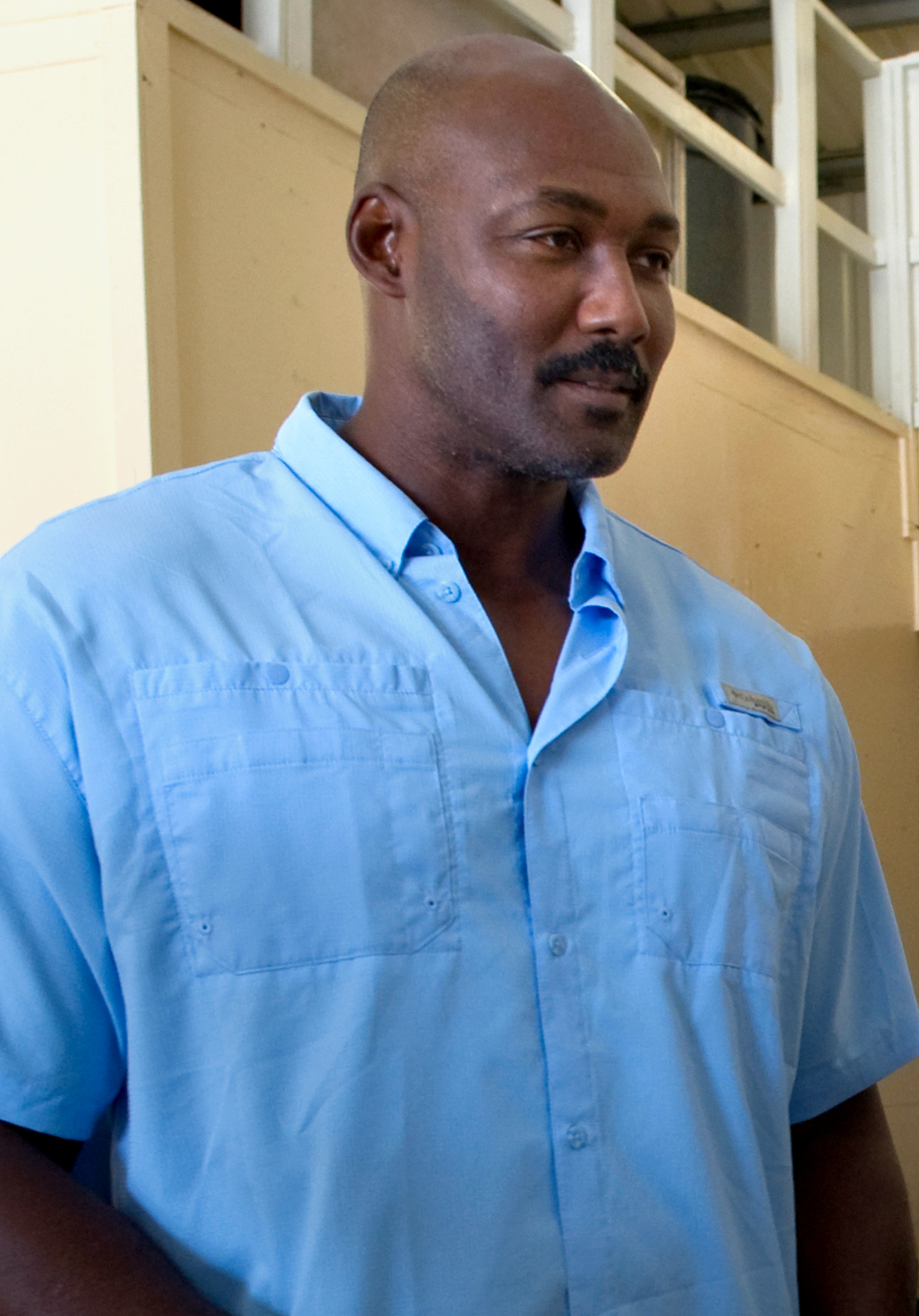
Karl Malone, Louisiana Tech, 1983

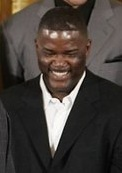
Joe Dumars, McNeese, 1985

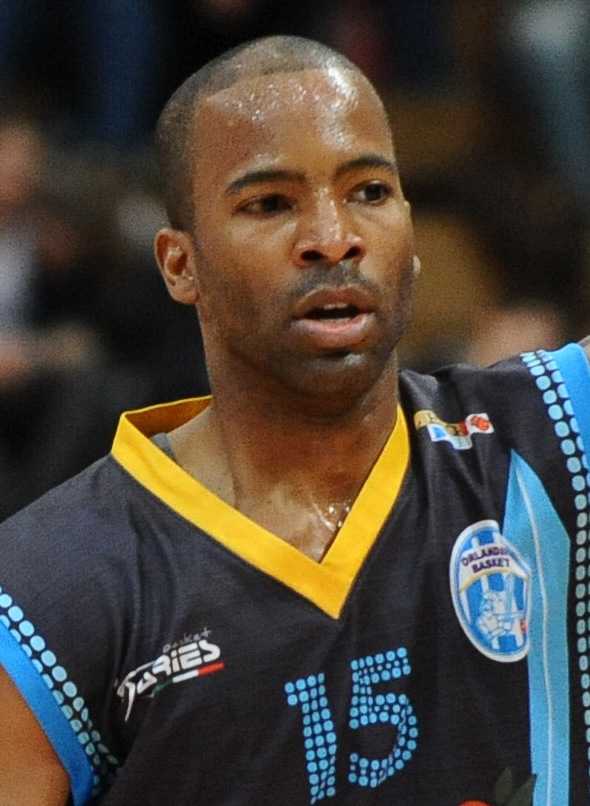
Donte Mathis, Texas State, 1999

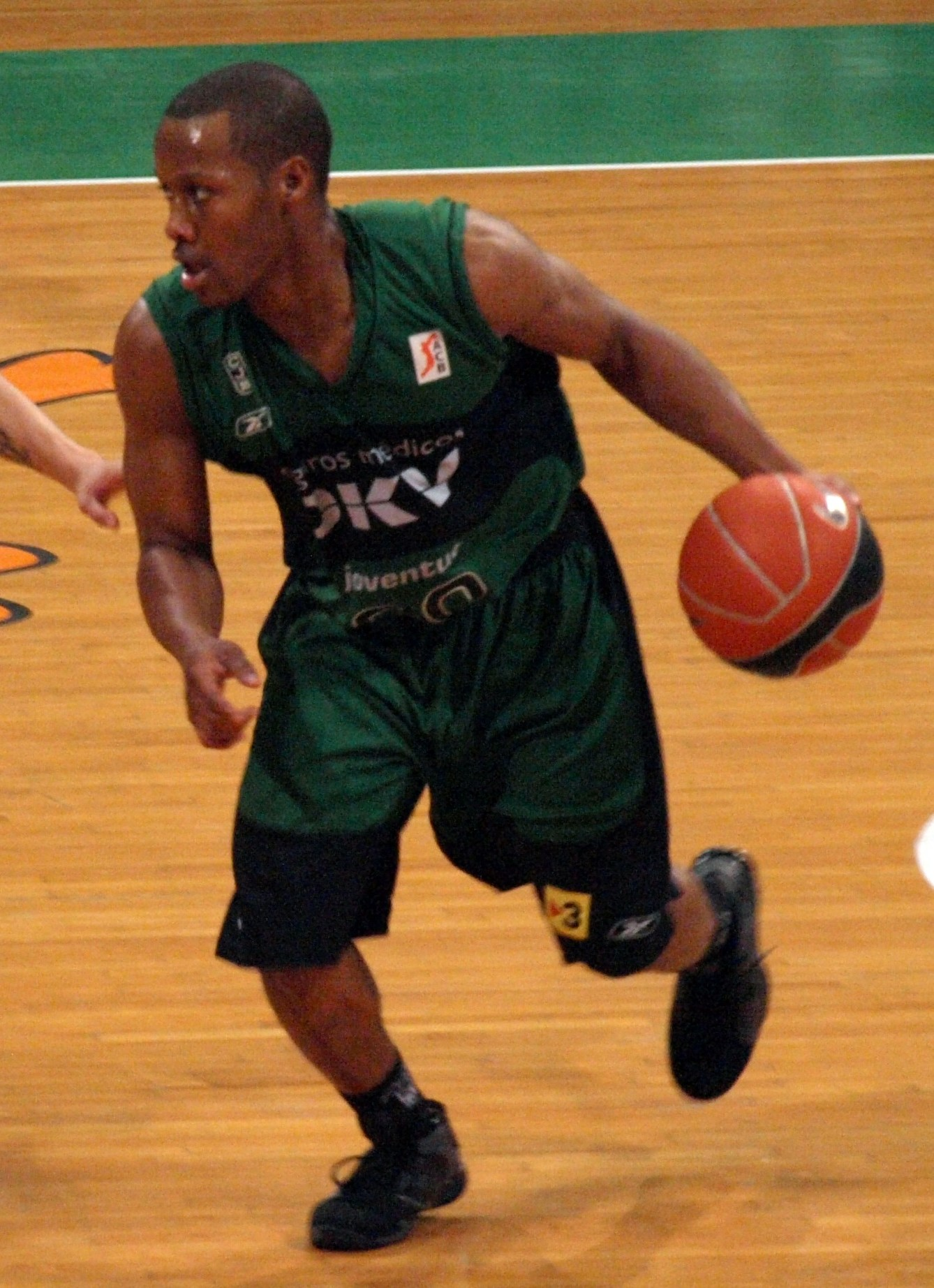
Demond Mallet, McNeese, 2001

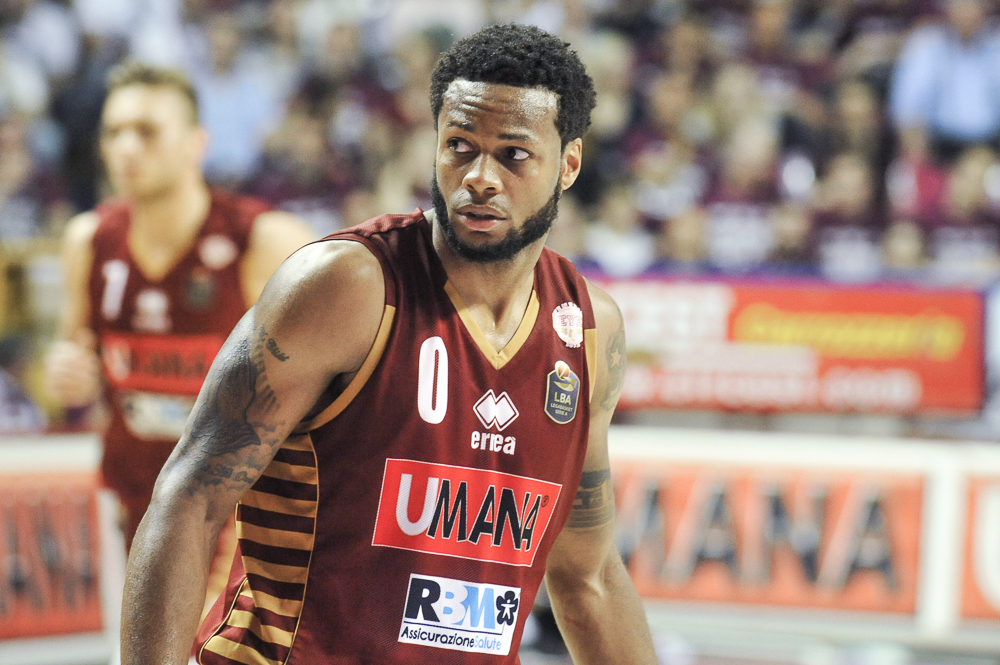
MarQuez Haynes, UT Arlington, 2010

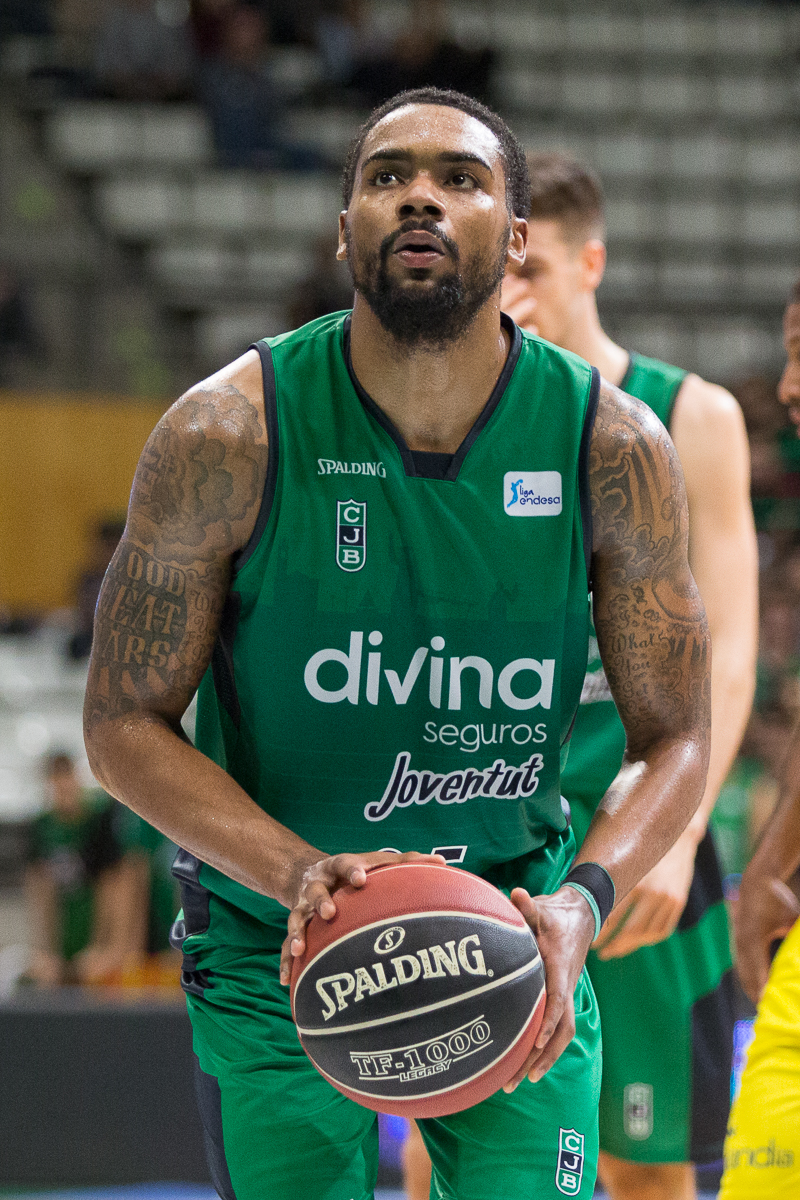
Patrick Richard, McNeese, 2012

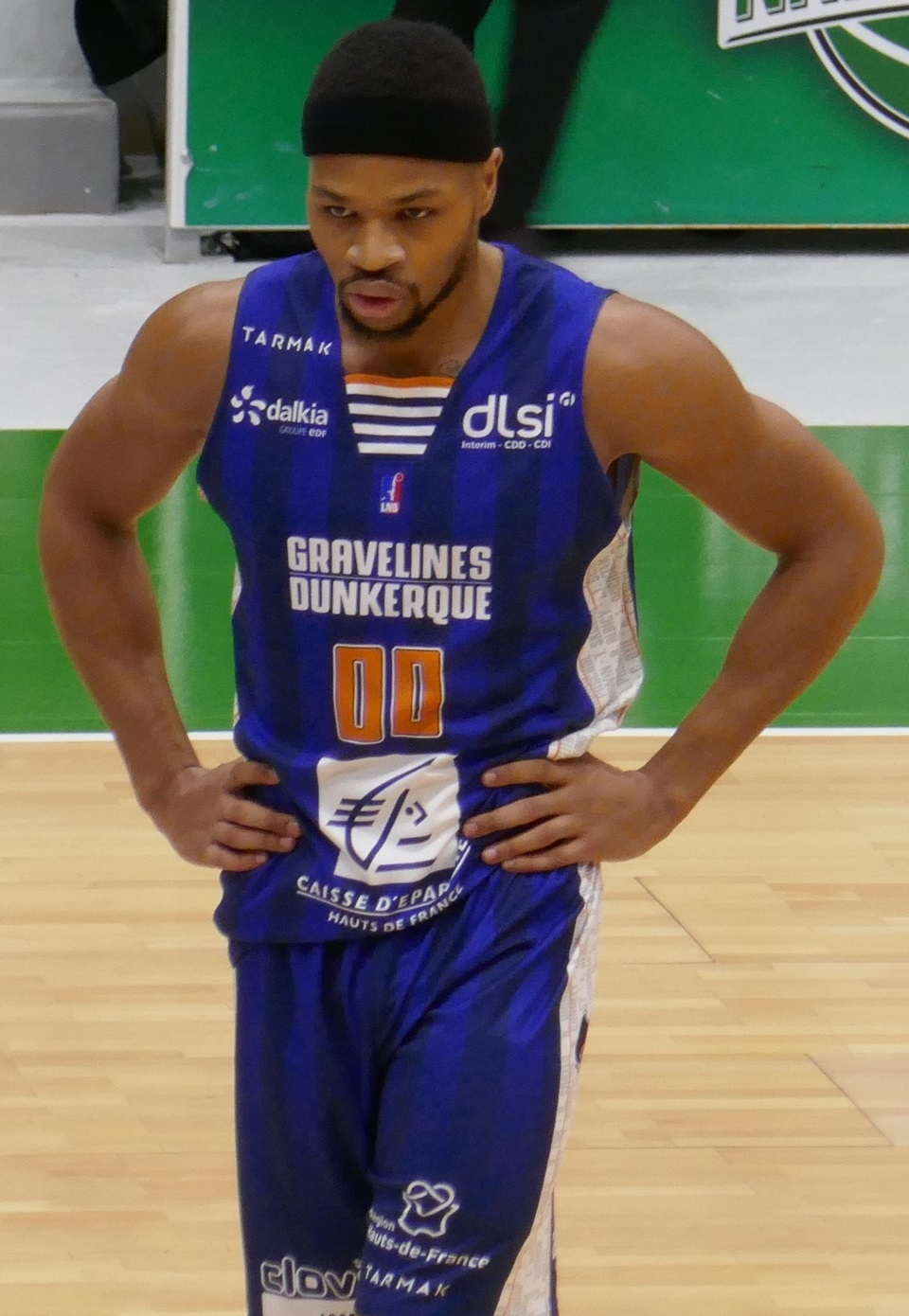
Taylor Smith, Stephen F. Austin, 2013

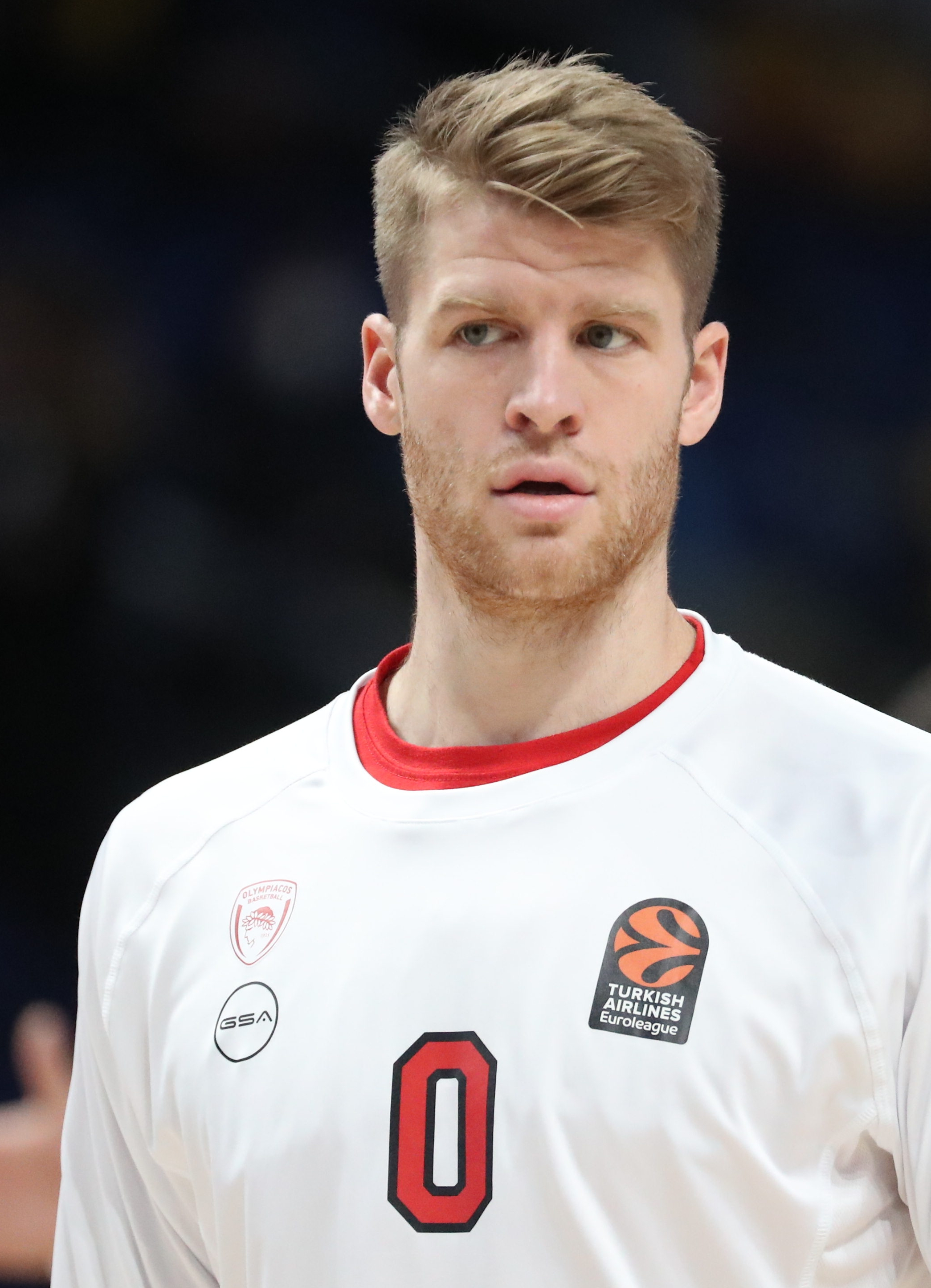
Thomas Walkup, Stephen F. Austin, 2015 and 2016

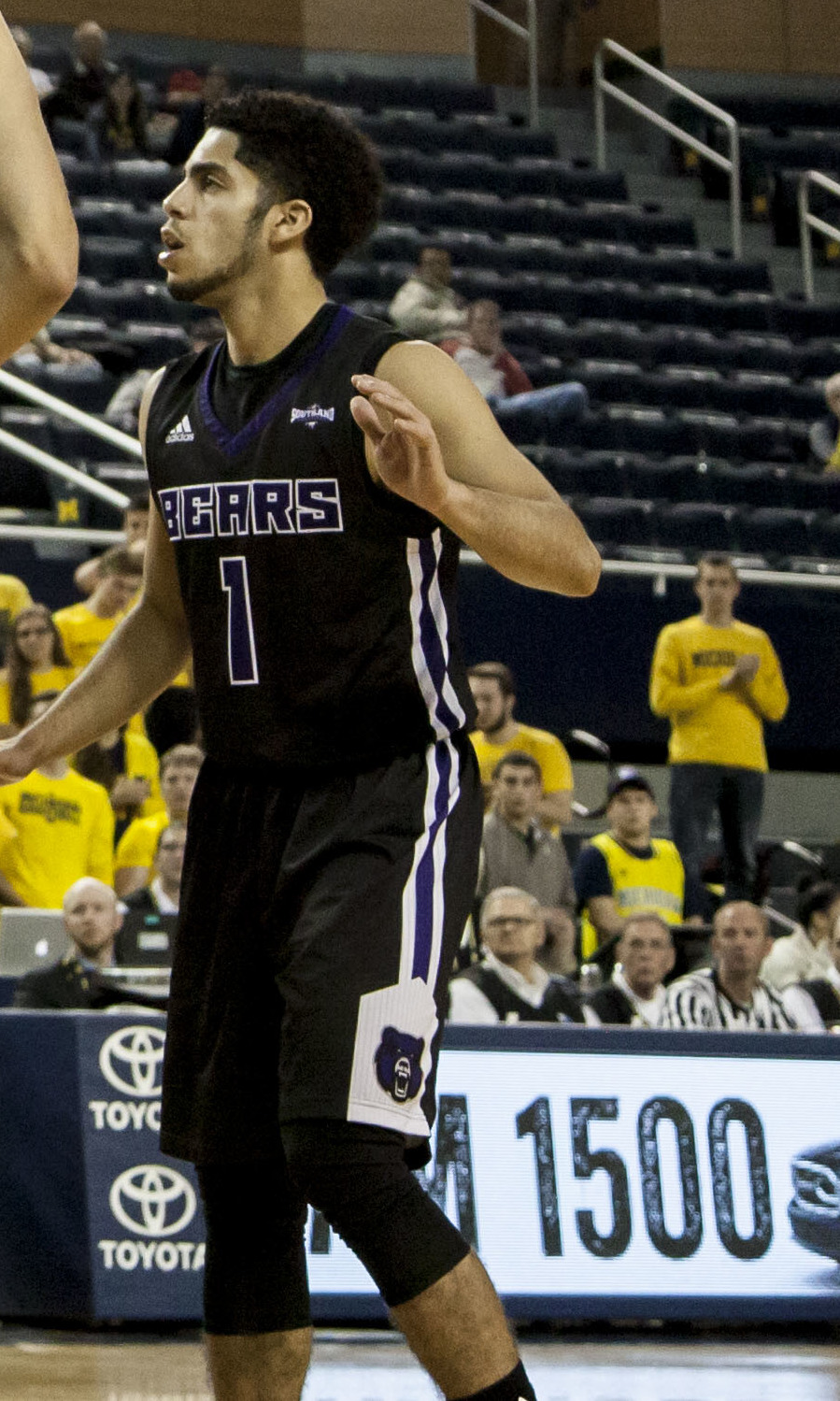
Jordan Howard, Central Arkansas, 2018

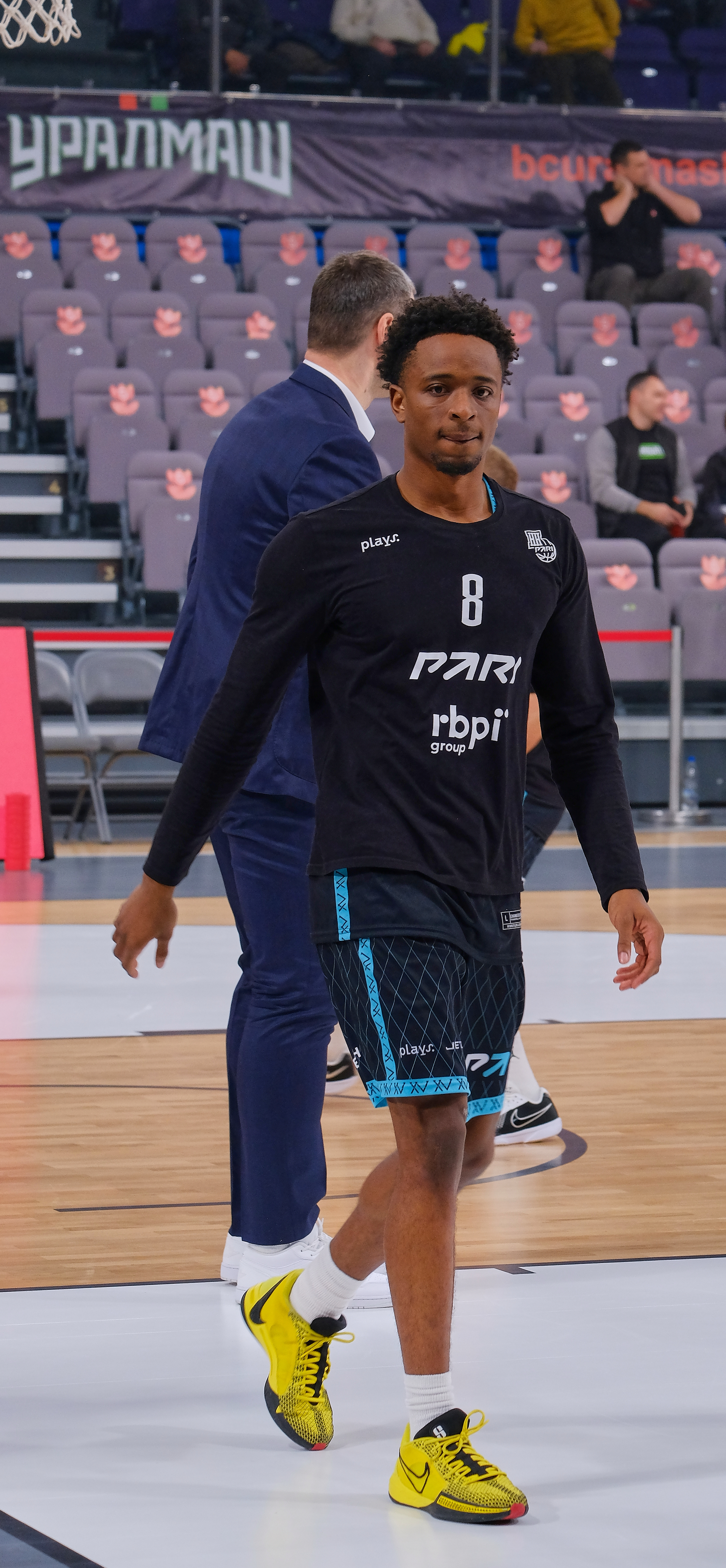
Zach Nutall, Sam Houston State, 2021

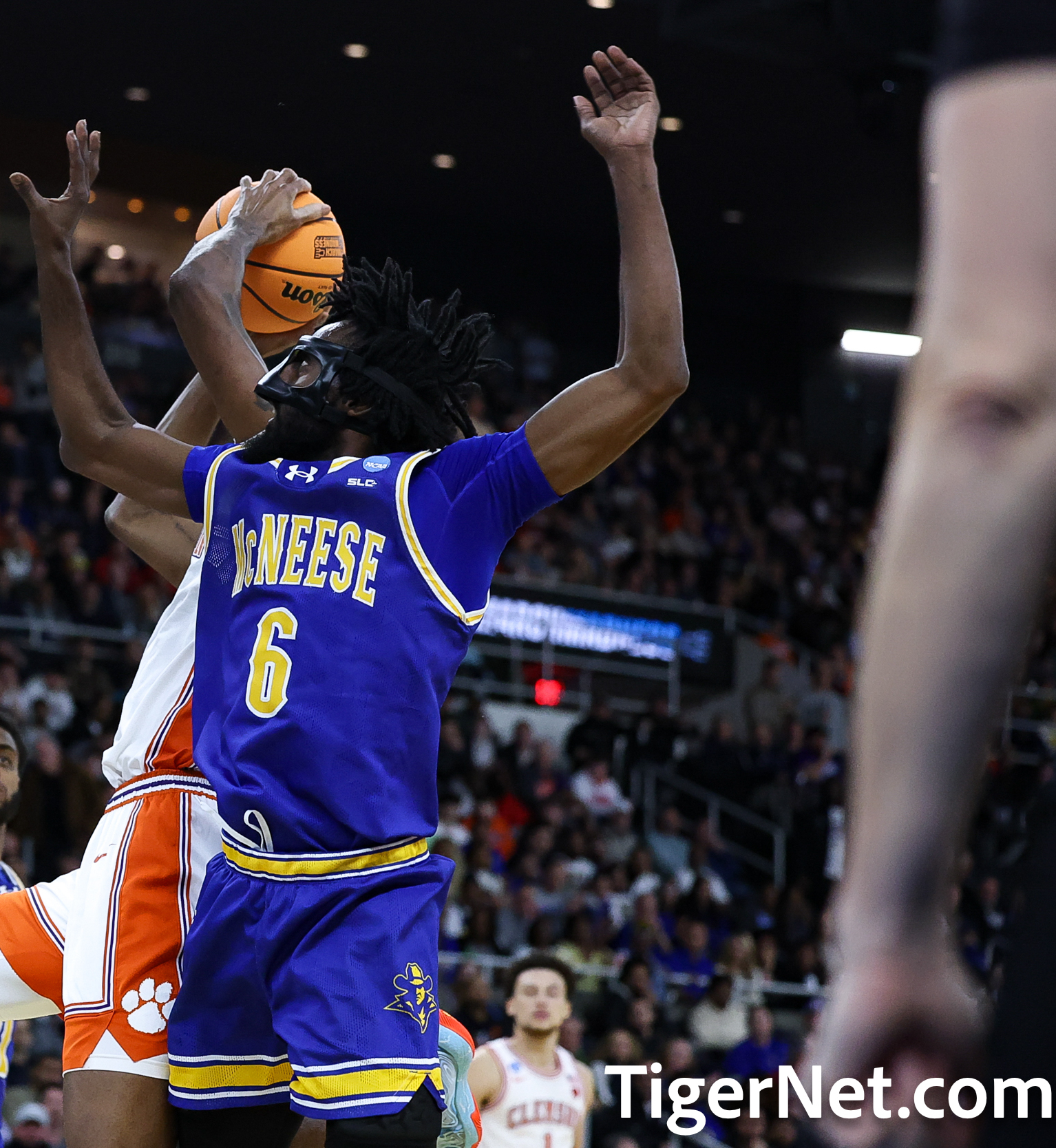
Javohn Garcia, McNeese, 2025

Season	Player	School	Position	Class	Reference
1963–64	Jerry Rook	Arkansas State	F	Junior	
1964–65	Jerry Rook (2)	Arkansas State	F	Senior	
1965–66	John Dickson	Arkansas State	C	Senior	
1966–67	Larry Jeffries	Trinity	F	Sophomore	
1967–68	John Ray Godfrey	Abilene Christian	G	Senior	
1968–69	Larry Jeffries (2)	Trinity	F	Senior	
1969–70	Kenny Haynes	Lamar	G	Senior	
1970–71^{†}	Luke Adams	Lamar	F	Senior	
1970–71^{†}	Allan Pruett	Arkansas State	G	Senior	
1971–72	Bo Lamar	Louisiana	SG	Junior	
1972–73	Mike Green	Louisiana Tech	C	Senior	
1973–74	Steve Brooks	Arkansas State	C	Senior	
1974–75	Henry Ray	McNeese	F	Sophomore	
1975–76	Mike McConathy	Louisiana Tech	SG	Junior	
1976–77	Dan Henderson	Arkansas State	C	Senior	
1977–78	Andrew Toney	Louisiana	G	Sophomore	
1978–79	David Lawrence	McNeese	PF	Junior	
1979–80	Andrew Toney (2)	Louisiana	G	Senior	
1980–81	Mike Olliver	Lamar	PG	Senior	
1981–82	Albert Culton	UT Arlington	SF	Senior	
1982–83	Karl Malone	Louisiana Tech	PF	Freshman	
1983–84	Tom Sewell	Lamar	SG	Junior	
1984–85	Joe Dumars	McNeese	PG / SG	Senior	
1985–86	Bobby Jenkins	Louisiana–Monroe	F	Senior	
1986–87	Jerome Batiste	McNeese	F	Senior	
1987–88	Tony Worrell	North Texas	F	Senior	
1988–89	Deon Hunter	North Texas	PG	Senior	
1989–90	Anthony Pullard	McNeese	C	Senior	
1990–91^{†}	Carlos Funchess	Louisiana–Monroe	PG / SG	Senior	
1990–91^{†}	Anthony Jones	Louisiana–Monroe	F	Senior	
1991–92	Ryan Stuart	Louisiana–Monroe	SF	Junior	
1992–93	Ryan Stuart (2)	Louisiana–Monroe	SF	Senior	
1993–94	Eric Kubel	Northwestern State	C	Senior	
1994–95	Reggie Jackson	Nicholls	SG	Senior	
1995–96	Paul Marshall	Louisiana–Monroe	SG	Junior	
1996–97	Rosell Ellis	McNeese	F	Senior	
1997–98	Roderic Hall	UTSA	G	Sophomore	
1998–99	Donte Mathis	Texas State	PG	Senior	
1999–00	Mike Smith	Louisiana–Monroe	PF	Senior	
2000–01	Demond Mallet	McNeese	PG	Senior	
2001–02	McEverett Powers	UTSA	PF	Senior	
2002–03	Donald Cole	Sam Houston State	SF	Sophomore	
2003–04	LeRoy Hurd	UTSA	SF	Senior	
2004–05	Joe Thompson	Sam Houston State	SF / SG	Sophomore	
2005–06	Ricky Woods	Southeastern Louisiana	F	Junior	
2006–07	Chris Daniels	Texas A&M–Corpus Christi	C	Junior	
2007–08	Josh Alexander	Stephen F. Austin	SF	Junior	
2008–09	Matt Kingsley	Stephen F. Austin	C	Senior	
2009–10	MarQuez Haynes	UT Arlington	G	Senior	
2010–11	Gilberto Clavell	Sam Houston State	SF	Senior	
2011–12	Patrick Richard	McNeese	SG / SF	Senior	
2012–13	Taylor Smith	Stephen F. Austin	PF	Senior	
2013–14	Jacob Parker	Stephen F. Austin	PF	Junior	
2014–15	Thomas Walkup	Stephen F. Austin	SG / SF	Junior	
2015–16	Thomas Walkup (2)	Stephen F. Austin	SG / SF	Senior	
2016–17	Erik Thomas	New Orleans	PF	Senior	
2017–18	Jordan Howard	Central Arkansas	SG	Senior	
2018–19	Cameron Delaney	Sam Houston State	SG	Senior	
2019–20	Kevon Harris	Stephen F. Austin	SG	Senior	
2020–21	Zach Nutall	Sam Houston State	SG	Junior	
2021–22	Ty Gordon	Nicholls	PG	Graduate	
2022–23	DeMarcus Sharp	Northwestern State	PG	Senior	
2023–24	Shahada Wells	McNeese	SG	Graduate	
2024–25	Javohn Garcia	McNeese	SG	Senior	
2025–26	Keon Thompson	Stephen F. Austin	PG / SG	Senior	

== Winners by school ==
School (year joined)	Winners	Years
McNeese (1972)	10	1975, 1979, 1985, 1987, 1990, 1997, 2001, 2012, 2024, 2025
Stephen F. Austin (1987/2024) (Note: Five schools left the conference in 2021. In addition to Abilene Christian and Lamar, which left for the second time, the University of Central Arkansas joined the Atlantic Sun Conference, and Sam Houston State University and Stephen F. Austin State University joined the Western Athletic Conference (WAC; now known as the United Athletic Conference). Sam Houston has since joined Conference USA (CUSA). Lamar returned to the SLC in 2022, and Stephen F. Austin returned in 2024. Central Arkansas moved to the UAC in 2026, coinciding with the WAC changing its name to the United Athletic Conference (UAC).)	8	2008, 2009, 2013, 2014, 2015, 2016, 2020, 2026
Louisiana–Monroe (Note: The University of Louisiana at Monroe left in 2005 to join its football team in the Sun Belt Conference.)	7	1986, 1991 (×2)^{†}, 1992, 1993, 1996, 2000
Arkansas State (1963) (Note: Arkansas State University left to form the American South Conference in 1987. The Red Wolves are now in the Sun Belt Conference.)	6	1964, 1965, 1966, 1971^{†}, 1974, 1977
Sam Houston State (1987)	5	2003, 2005, 2011, 2019, 2021
Lamar (1963/1999/2022) (Note: Lamar University left in 1987 to form the American South Conference, later competing in the Sun Belt Conference and as an independent before returning to the Southland in 1999. Lamar left again in 2021, this time for the WAC, but rejoined the SLC the next year.)	4	1970, 1971^{†}, 1981, 1984
Louisiana Tech (Note: Louisiana Tech University left in 1987 to form the American South Conference. The Bulldogs (and Lady Techsters) are now in the Sun Belt Conference.)	3	1973, 1976, 1983
Louisiana (Note: The University of Louisiana at Lafayette (ULL), then known as Southwestern Louisiana, left in 1982 to become an independent. ULL is now in the Sun Belt Conference, and brands its athletic program solely as "Louisiana".)	3	1972, 1978, 1980
UTSA (1991) (Note: The University of Texas at San Antonio left in 2012 to join the WAC. The Roadrunners spent only one season in the WAC before joining CUSA, and have since joined the American Conference.)	3	1998, 2002, 2004
Nicholls (1991)	2	1995, 2022
North Texas (Note: The University of North Texas left to join the Big West Conference in 1996. The Mean Green moved from there to CUSA and then the American.)	2	1988, 1989
Northwestern State (1987)	2	1994, 2023
Trinity (1963) (Note: Trinity College (now Trinity University) was a founding member in 1963, but departed in 1971. The Tigers are now in the Division III Southern Collegiate Athletic Conference.)	2	1967, 1969
UT Arlington (1963) (Note: The University of Texas at Arlington (now athletically branded as "UT Arlington") and Texas State University (then officially known as Texas State University–San Marcos) left in 2012 to join the WAC. Both schools spent only one season in the WAC before joining the Sun Belt Conference; UT Arlington rejoined the WAC in 2022. The WAC rebranded as the UAC in 2026 with UT Arlington as a member, and Texas State moved to the Pac-12 Conference in 2026.)	2	1982, 2010
Abilene Christian (1963/2013) (Note: Abilene Christian College was also a founding member, but departed in 1973. After 40 years in Division II Lone Star Conference, Abilene Christian (now a "University") returned to Division I and the Southland Conference in 2013 before leaving again in 2021, this time for the WAC. Abilene Christian's WAC membership transferred to the UAC in 2026.)	1	1968
Central Arkansas (2006)	1	2018
LSU New Orleans (2013) (Note: Known as the University of New Orleans before July 1, 2026.)	1	2017
Southeastern Louisiana (1997)	1	2006
Texas A&M–Corpus Christi (2006)	1	2007
Texas State (1987)	1	1999
East Texas A&M (2022) (Note: Known as Texas A&M University–Commerce until November 7, 2024.)	0	—
Houston Christian (2013) (Note: Known as Houston Baptist University until September 21, 2022.)	0	—
Incarnate Word (2013)	0	—
Oral Roberts (2012) (Note: Oral Roberts University left the Southland Conference in 2014, returning to its previous home of The Summit League.)	0	—
UT Rio Grande Valley (2024)	0	—
