= 1998–99 Arkansas State Indians men's basketball team =

American college basketball season

1998–99 Arkansas State Indians men's basketball

Sun Belt tournament champions

NCAA tournament
- Conference: Sun Belt Conference
- Record: 18–12 (9–5 Sun Belt)
- Head coach: Dickey Nutt (2nd season)
- Assistant coach: Tony Madlock
- Home arena: Convocation Center

1998–99 Sun Belt Conference men's basketball standings
	Conf.				Overall
Team	W		L	PCT	W		L	PCT
Louisiana Tech	10	–	4	.714	19	–	9	.679
Arkansas State †	9	–	5	.643	18	–	12	.600
Florida International	7	–	7	.500	13	–	16	.448
SW Louisiana	7	–	7	.500	13	–	16	.448
Western Kentucky	7	–	7	.500	13	–	16	.448
South Alabama	6	–	8	.429	11	–	16	.407
New Orleans	5	–	9	.357	14	–	16	.467
Arkansas-Little Rock	5	–	9	.357	12	–	15	.444
† 1999 Sun Belt Conference tournament winner Rankings from AP Poll

The 1998–99 Arkansas State Indians men's basketball team represented Arkansas State University during the 1998–99 NCAA Division I men's basketball season. The Indians, led by second-year head coach Dickey Nutt, played their home games at the Convocation Center in Jonesboro, Arkansas as members of the Sun Belt Conference.

After finishing second in the conference regular season standings, the team won the Sun Belt tournament to secure the conference's automatic bid to the NCAA tournament. Playing as the No. 15 seed in the Midwest region, Arkansas State was beaten by No. 2 seed Utah, 80–58, in the opening round.

To date, this season marks the only appearance in the NCAA tournament in program history.

== Roster ==
1998–99 Arkansas State Red Wolves men's basketball team
Players	Coaches
Pos. / # / Name / Height / Weight / Year / Hometown; G / 11 / Chico Fletcher / 5 ft 6 in (1.68 m) / 170 lb (77 kg) / Jr / Osceola, Arkansas	Head coach: Dickey Nutt; Assistant coach(es): Tony Madlock (Memphis); Legend: (C) Team captain; (S) Suspended; (I) Ineligible; (W) Walk-on; Injured; Current redshirt; Roster

== Schedule and results ==
Date time, TV	Rank^{#}	Opponent^{#}	Result	Record	Site (attendance) city, state
Non-conference regular season
Nov 13, 1998*		at Saint Louis	L 60–63	0–1	Kiel Center; St. Louis, Missouri
Nov 16, 1998*		Baylor	W 66–64	1–1	Convocation Center; Jonesboro, Arkansas
Nov 18, 1998*		Oral Roberts	L 66–71	1–2	Convocation Center; Jonesboro, Arkansas
Nov 23, 1998*		at TCU	L 85–94	1–3	Daniel-Meyer Coliseum; Fort Worth, Texas
Sun Belt Conference regular season
Feb 20, 1999		Louisiana Tech	L 83–85	15–11 (9–5)	Convocation Center; Jonesboro, Arkansas
Sun Belt tournament
Feb 27, 1999		vs. New Orleans; Quarterfinals	W 70–53	16–11	Cajundome; Lafayette, Louisiana
Feb 28, 1999		vs. Florida International; Semifinals	W 87–69	17–11	Cajundome; Lafayette, Louisiana
Mar 2, 1999		vs. Western Kentucky; Championship game	W 65–48	18–11	Cajundome; Lafayette, Louisiana
NCAA tournament
Mar 12, 1999*; CBS	(15 MW)	vs. (2 MW) No. 6 Utah; First round	L 58–80	18–12	Louisiana Superdome; New Orleans, Louisiana
*Non-conference game. ^{#}Rankings from AP Poll. (#) Tournament seedings in parentheses. All times are in Central Time..

== Awards and honors ==
- Chico Fletcher – Sun Belt Conference Player of the Year (2x)
