= Javohn Garcia =

American basketball player (born 2002)

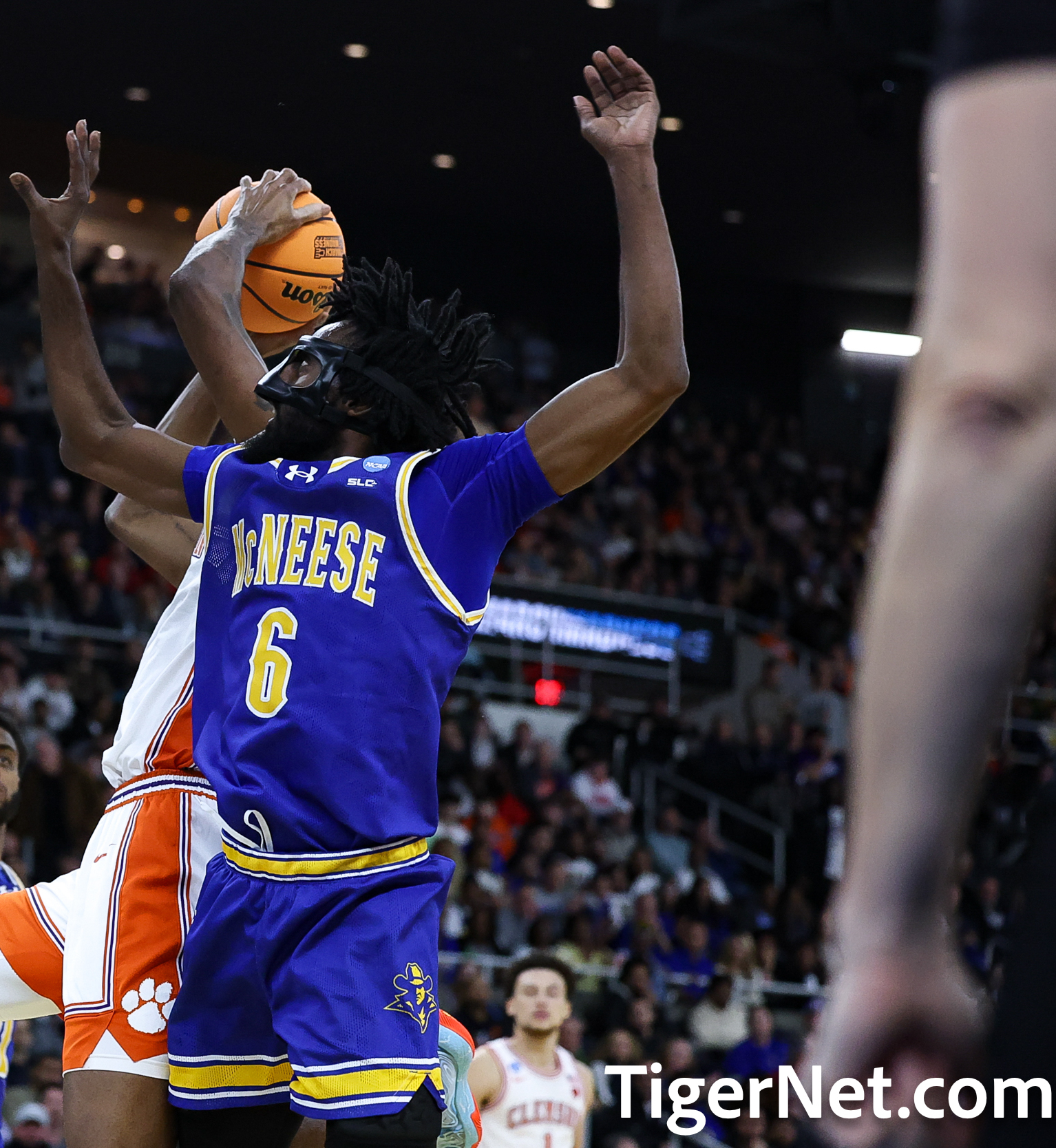

Personal information
- Born: February 26, 2001 (age 25)
- Listed height: 6 ft 3 in (1.91 m)
- Listed weight: 185 lb (84 kg)

Career information
- High school: Pickerington Central (Pickerington, Ohio); Brewster Academy (Wolfeboro, New Hampshire)
- College: UMass (2020–2022); College of the Sequoias (2022–2023); McNeese (2023–2026)
- NBA draft: 2026: undrafted
- Position: Shooting guard

Career highlights
- Southland Player of the Year (2025); First-team All-Southland (2025); 2× Southland tournament MVP (2025, 2026)

Javohn Garcia (born February 26, 2001) is an American basketball player. He played college basketball for the UMass Minutemen, College of the Sequoias Giants and McNeese Cowboys.

== High school career ==
Garcia attended Pickerington High School Central and averaged 19.5 points per game as a senior. He did a postgraduate year at Brewster Academy. A three-star recruit, he committed to play college basketball at UMass in November 2019.

== College career ==
Garcia played two seasons at UMass and averaged 8.2 points per game. Garcia transferred to College of the Sequoias and averaged 20.8 points, 5.2 rebounds, and 3.6 assists per game. He earned California Community College Men’s Basketball Coaches Association (CCCMBCA) North Player of the Year honors and transferred to McNeese State. Garcia averaged 11.2 points per game as a junior, earning Southland Conference All-Tournament Team honors after leading the Cowboys to the NCAA Tournament. He wore a mask during his senior season after breaking his nose over the summer. As a senior, Garcia averaged 12.6 points and 3.4 rebounds per game. He was named Southland Player of the Year as well as First Team All-Southland. On March 11, 2026, Garcia scored a career-high 31 points in a 76-59 win over Stephen F. Austin in the Southland tournament final and was named MVP. In his final season, Garcia averaged 11.9 points per game.
