= Jacob Parker =

American basketball player

Personal information
- Born: July 9, 1993 (age 33) Bixby, Oklahoma, U.S.
- Listed height: 6 ft 6 in (1.98 m)
- Listed weight: 210 lb (95 kg)

Career information
- High school: Bixby (Bixby, Oklahoma)
- College: Stephen F. Austin (2011–2015)
- NBA draft: 2015: undrafted
- Playing career: 2015–2018
- Position: Power forward
- Number: 34

Career history
- 2015–2016: Tajfun
- 2016–2017: Oettinger Rockets
- 2017–2018: NINERS Chemnitz

Career highlights
- Southland Player of the Year (2014); First-team All-Southland (2014); Second-team All-Southland (2015)

Jacob Parker (born July 9, 1993) is an American basketball player. He competed collegiately for the Stephen F. Austin Lumberjacks. Parker was named Southland Conference Player of the Year in 2014.

On July 29, 2015, Parker signed a contract with Slovenian champions KK Šentjur of the Telemach League and the ABA League.
