= Anthony Mathis =

American basketball player (born 1996)

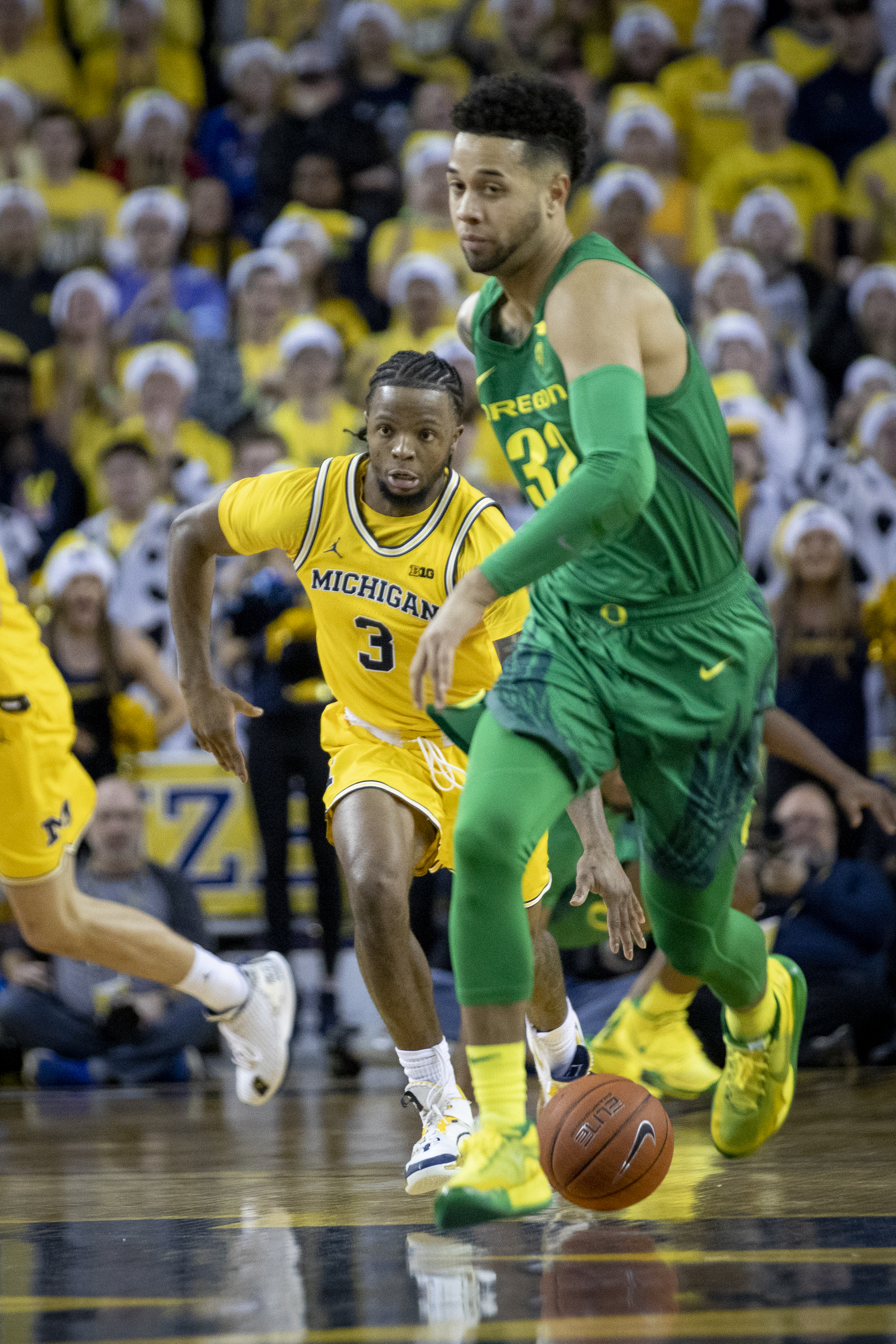
- Mathis in 2019

No. 32 – BC Kalev
- Position: Shooting guard
- League: Korvpalli Meistriliiga; Latvian-Estonian Basketball League

Personal information
- Born: November 23, 1996 (age 29) West Linn, Oregon, U.S.
- Listed height: 6 ft 3 in (1.91 m)
- Listed weight: 185 lb (84 kg)

Career information
- High school: West Linn (West Linn, Oregon)
- College: New Mexico (2015–2019); Oregon (2019–2020)
- NBA draft: 2020: undrafted
- Playing career: 2020–present

Career history
- 2020: Charilaos Trikoupis
- 2021–2022: Austin Spurs
- 2022: Texas Legends
- 2022: Uppsala Basket
- 2022–2023: CSM Târgu Mureș
- 2023: Saskatchewan Rattlers
- 2023–present: Kalev/Cramo

Career highlights
- 2× Third-team All-Mountain West (2018, 2019)

Anthony Mathis (born November 23, 1996) is an American professional basketball player for the BC Kalev of the Latvian-Estonian Basketball League. He played college basketball for New Mexico and Oregon.

== Early life and high school career ==
Mathis attended West Linn High School alongside Payton Pritchard. He helped win three 6A state basketball titles. As a junior, Mathis was named to the Class 6A first-team all-state. He scored 38 points in an upset of Joseph Wheeler High School in the Les Schwab Invitational during his senior season. In May 2014, he committed to New Mexico over Oregon State, Portland and UNLV.

== College career ==
Mathis averaged 2.3 points per game as a freshman at New Mexico. He averaged 2.9 points per game as a sophomore and an injury ended his season after 10 games. Following the season, Mathis contemplated quitting basketball and eventually asked coach Craig Neal for a release from his scholarship in order to transfer. While talking with potential schools, Neal was fired and Mathis ended up remaining at New Mexico under new coach Paul Weir. As a junior, Mathis averaged 12.7 points per game, making 98 three pointers while shooting 47.3 percent from behind the arc, fourth-highest in Division 1. He scored a career-high 27 points on January 5, 2019, in a 85–58 win over sixth-ranked Nevada. He averaged 14.4 points, 2.2 rebounds, and 2.1 assists per game as a senior, setting a school record with 106 made three-pointers on 41.6 percent shooting. Mathis was named to the Third Team All-Mountain West for the second straight season.

On April 17, Mathis was granted an additional season of eligibility by the NCAA on account of his injury-shortened sophomore season. On June 5, Mathis committed to Oregon as a graduate transfer, choosing the Ducks over Boston College, Kansas, Houston, Oklahoma, and Texas A&M, among others. Mathis scored 19 points on December 14, shooting 6-of-10 from three-point range, in a 71–70 win over fifth-ranked Michigan. As a redshirt senior, Mathis averaged 8.5 points and 2.3 rebounds per game.

== Professional career ==
=== Charilaos Trikoupis (2020) ===
On July 25, 2020, Mathis signed his first professional contract with Charilaos Trikoupis of the Greek Basket League. On December 14, 2020, he parted ways with the Greek team.

=== Austin Spurs (2021–2022) ===
On January 11, 2021, Mathis was selected 31st overall by the Austin Spurs in that month's 2021 NBA G League draft. He made his debut for the Spurs on February 10, 2021, finishing with four points in a win against the Memphis Hustle.

On October 27, 2021, Mathis re-signed with the Austin Spurs.

=== Texas Legends (2022) ===
On February 22, 2022, Mathis was traded to the Texas Legends, following the injury of several Legends guards.

== Personal life ==
When Mathis was in sixth grade, Payton Pritchard's parents became Mathis's legal guardians.
