= Dickey Nutt =

College basketball coach

Current position
- Title: Assistant coach
- Team: Missouri Tigers
- Conference: Southeastern Conference

Biographical details
- Born: June 13, 1959 (age 67); Little Rock, Arkansas, U.S.

Playing career
- 1977–1982: Oklahoma State

Coaching career (HC unless noted)
- 1982–1985: Stillwater HS (assistant)
- 1985–1987: Oklahoma State (assistant)
- 1987–1995: Arkansas State (assistant)
- 1995–2008: Arkansas State
- 2009–2015: Southeast Missouri State
- 2015–2018: Florida State (video coordinator)
- 2018–2019: Stetson (assistant)
- 2019–2021: Cleveland State (special assistant)
- 2021–2022: Gaston College
- 2022–present: Missouri (assistant)

Head coaching record
- Overall: 273–296
- Tournaments: 0–1 (NCAA Division I)

Accomplishments and honors

Championships
- Sun Belt tournament (1999)

Awards
- Sun Belt Coach of the Year (1998)

David Albert "Dickey" Nutt (born June 13, 1959) is an American college basketball coach who is currently assistant to the head coach and senior advisor for the University of Missouri men's basketball team. His most recent head coaching position was at Southeast Missouri State University before being let go after the 2014-15 season. Born in Little Rock, Arkansas, he became the head coach of Arkansas State University in 1995 and resigned on February 19, 2008, ending his thirteen years as head coach just 3 victories short of the all-time win record for the school. In June 2007, Nutt had said that his future with the school was uncertain after receiving a one-year contract with the school.

Nutt had been coaching at Arkansas State since 1987, when he started as an assistant at the university. Prior to that, he had spent two years as an assistant coach at Oklahoma State. He led the Indians, now the Red Wolves, to the NCAA tournament once, winning the Sun Belt Conference tournament to secure the conference's automatic bid in 1999. Arkansas State received a 15 seed, and was eliminated by Utah in the first round.

Nutt played collegiately at Oklahoma State from 1977 to 1982. After graduating, he began his coaching career in the high school ranks as an assistant coach at Stillwater High School in Oklahoma.

On March 12, 2009, Nutt was named as the head basketball coach at Southeast Missouri State University.

On March 23, 2015, Nutt was relieved of his duties with the Redhawks. On July 7, 2015, Nutt joined the staff of Leonard Hamilton at Florida State.

On June 20, 2018, Nutt joined Corey Williams' staff at Stetson University as assistant coach.

On August 8, 2019, Nutt was named a special assistant coach on Dennis Gates' staff at Cleveland State University. On April 14, 2022, Nutt was hired as an assistant coach by Gates at the University of Missouri.

== Family ==
Nutt's brother, Houston Nutt, was the head football coach at the University of Mississippi and University of Arkansas. Another brother, Dennis Nutt, was previously head coach for Texas State University and a former professional basketball player.

Nutt has three children, two sons and a daughter. His oldest son Logan played basketball for Ole Miss before transferring to Southeast Missouri State in December 2009 joining his younger brother, Lucas, who played for his father at Southeast Missouri State through 2014.

== Head coaching record ==
Record table
Season	Team	Overall	Conference	Standing	Postseason
Arkansas State Indians / Red Wolves (Sun Belt Conference) (1995–2008)
1995–96	Arkansas State	9–18	7–11	T–6th	
1996–97	Arkansas State	15–12	8–10	8th	
1997–98	Arkansas State	20–9	14–4	T–1st	
1998–99	Arkansas State	18–12	9–5	2nd	NCAA Division I First Round
1999–00	Arkansas State	10–18	7–9	6th	
2000–01	Arkansas State	17–13	10–6	T–2nd (East)	
2001–02	Arkansas State	15–16	5–9	4th (East)	
2002–03	Arkansas State	13–15	6–8	4th (East)	
2003–04	Arkansas State	17–11	7–7	4th (East)	
2004–05	Arkansas State	16–13	7–7	T–3rd (East)	
2005–06	Arkansas State	12–18	7–7	3rd (East)	
2006–07	Arkansas State	18–15	11–7	T–1st (West)	
2007–08*	Arkansas State	9–17	4–11	7th (West)	
Arkansas State:		189–187	102–101		
Southeast Missouri State Redhawks (Ohio Valley Conference) (2009–2015)
2009–10	Southeast Missouri State	7–23	3–15	9th	
2010–11	Southeast Missouri State	10–22	6–12	T–7th	
2011–12	Southeast Missouri State	15–15	9–7	T–4th	
2012–13	Southeast Missouri State	17–16	8–8	2nd (West)	
2013–14	Southeast Missouri State	18–14	8–8	2nd (West)	
2014–15	Southeast Missouri State	13–17	7–9	5th (West)	
Southeast Missouri State:		80–107	42–59		
Total:		279–304			
National champion Postseason invitational champion Conference regular season champion Conference regular season and conference tournament champion Division regular season champion Division regular season and conference tournament champion Conference tournament champion

* Nutt resigned on February 19, 2008.
