= Josh Alexander (basketball) =

American basketball player (born 1987)

Personal information
- Born: September 28, 1987 (age 39) Shreveport, Louisiana, U.S.
- Listed height: 6 ft 5 in (1.96 m)
- Listed weight: 210 lb (95 kg)

Career information
- High school: C. E. Byrd (Shreveport, Louisiana)
- College: Stephen F. Austin (2005–2009)
- NBA draft: 2009: undrafted
- Playing career: 2009–2015
- Position: Small forward

Career history
- 2009–2010: Polonia Warsaw
- 2011: Trefl Sopot
- 2011–2012: Bakken Bears
- 2012–2013: RTV21
- 2013: Maccabi Beer Yaakov
- 2013–2014: A.S. Ramat HaSharon
- 2014–2015: BC Orchies
- 2015: Hapoel Migdal Ha'emek

Career highlights
- Southland Player of the Year (2008); First-team All-Southland (2008); Second-team All-Southland (2009); Southland Freshman of the Year (2006)

Joshua Alexander (born September 28, 1987) is an American former professional basketball player. He played college basketball at Stephen F. Austin.

== College career ==
Alexander was named Southland Conference Freshman of the Year. As a junior, Alexander averaged 16.1 points and 5.8 rebounds per game. He was named Southland Player of the Year as well as First Team All-Southland. Alexander averaged 14.3 points and 5.5 rebounds per game as a senior. He helped the team reach their first NCAA Tournament in 2009. He finished his career with 1,074 points and 684 rebounds.

== Professional career ==
In September 2009, Alexander signed his first professional contract with Polonia Warsaw of the Polish Basketball League. In December 2011, he signed with the Bakken Bears of the Danish league. He was named regular season and tournament MVP after leading the team to the championship. In 2013, Alexander joined Maccabi Be'er Ya'akov of the Israeli National League and averaged 20.2 points per game. For the 2013–14 season, he signed with A.S. Ramat HaSharon and averaged 19.7 points and 7.5 rebounds per game. In August 2014, Alexander signed with BC Orchies of the French Nationale Masculine 1.
