= Donte Mathis =

American basketball player and coach

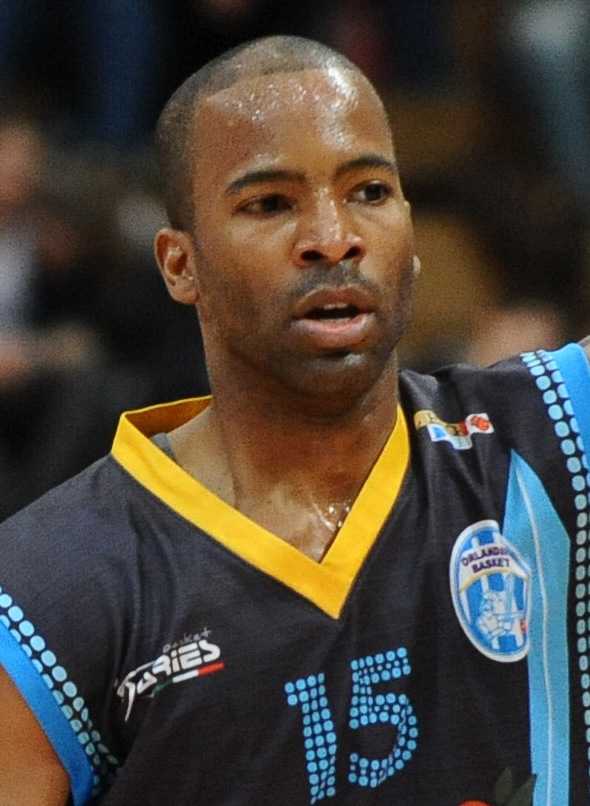
- Mathis with Orlandina Basket in 2013

Texas State Bobcats
- Title: Assistant coach
- League: Sun Belt Conference

Personal information
- Born: July 13, 1977 (age 49) San Antonio, Texas, U.S.
- Listed height: 6 ft 3 in (1.91 m)
- Listed weight: 187 lb (85 kg)

Career information
- High school: East Central (San Antonio, Texas)
- College: Texas State (1995–1999)
- NBA draft: 1999: undrafted
- Playing career: 1999–2013
- Position: Guard
- Coaching career: 2017–present

Career history

Playing
- 1999–2001: Billings RimRockers
- 2003: Krka
- 2003–2004: Virtus Ragusa
- 2004–2006: Ignis Novara
- 2006: Scavolini Pesaro
- 2007: Zarotti Imola
- 2007–2009: Fastweb Junior Casale
- 2009–2011: Snaidero Cucine Udine
- 2011–2012: Pistoia
- 2012–2013: Orlandina Basket

Coaching
- 2017–2019: Texas Christian School
- 2020–2021: Brentwood Christian School
- 2021–present: Texas State (assistant)

Career highlights
- Southland Player of the Year (1999); 2× First-team All-Southland (1998, 1999); Second-team All-Southland (1997)

Donte Marcel Mathis (born July 13, 1977) is an American basketball coach and former professional player who is an assistant coach for the Texas State Bobcats men's team. He played college basketball for the Bobcats from 1995 to 1999. Mathis played professionally in Europe for 13 years.

== Playing career ==
=== High school career ===
Mathis attended East Central High School in San Antonio, Texas. He was a starter during his senior season as his team achieved a 35–0 record and won the 1995 Class 5A boys basketball state championship.

=== College career ===
Mathis was a four-year starter for the Bobcats under the direction of head coach Mike Miller. He was the runner-up for the Southland Conference Freshman of the Year award during the 1995–96 season.

The Bobcats won the conference and tournament championship during the 1996–97 season. The team advanced to the first round of the 1997 NCAA tournament for the second tournament appearance in program history. Mathis was selected to the All-Southland second team and was named by his coaches and teammates as the Bobcats' most valuable player.

As a junior in the 1997–98 season, Mathis led his team in scoring with 18.6 points per game and was selected again as his team's most valuable player. He was named to the All-Southland first team.

In his 1998–99 senior season, Mathis led his team in scoring for a second consecutive year with 17.6 points per game as the Bobcats finished with a 19–9 record. He was chosen as the Southland Conference Men's Basketball Player of the Year and named to the All-Southland first team. The Bobcats won their second Southland Conference championship.

Mathis' career scoring record of 1,622 points ranks fourth highest in program history. He also ranks 3rd in steals with 161, 10th in assists with 259 and 16th in rebounds with 567. He is one of only four Bobcats players to have 1,300+ points, 500+ rebounds and 100+ steals. Mathis was inducted into the Texas State Athletics Hall of Honor in 2020.

=== Professional career ===
Mathis played for the Billings RimRockers of the International Basketball Association from 1999 to 2001 and averaged 13.5 points per game.

Mathis played in Europe for 13 years where he spent the majority of his career in Italy for 11 seasons. He played one season each in Germany and Slovenia. Mathis won three championships.

Mathis played for Krka during the 2002–03 season. He played for Pistoia Basket 2000 in 2011–12 and Orlandina Basket in 2012–13.

== Coaching career ==
After his playing career ended in 2013, Mathis served as a clinician in partnership with Hakeem Olajuwon to develop basketball internationally, volunteered to provide outlets for student-athletes to earn collegiate scholarships and was a player development specialist for collegiate and professional athletes.

Mathis began his coaching career as head coach and assistant athletic director at Texas Christian School of Houston, Texas, in 2017. He led the team to the league championship quarterfinals in 2018 and the championship game in 2019. Mathis coached for one season at Brentwood Christian School in Austin, Texas.

On August 27, 2021, Mathis returned to his alma mater as an assistant coach for the Bobcats. Head coach Terrence Johnson stated that Mathis' connection to Texan basketball prospects would help with the team's recruiting efforts. He is responsible for mentoring the Texas State guards and oversees recruiting in East Texas, Houston, Louisiana and Arizona.

== Personal life ==
Mathis has two sons with his wife.
