= Zach Nutall =

American basketball player (born 1999)

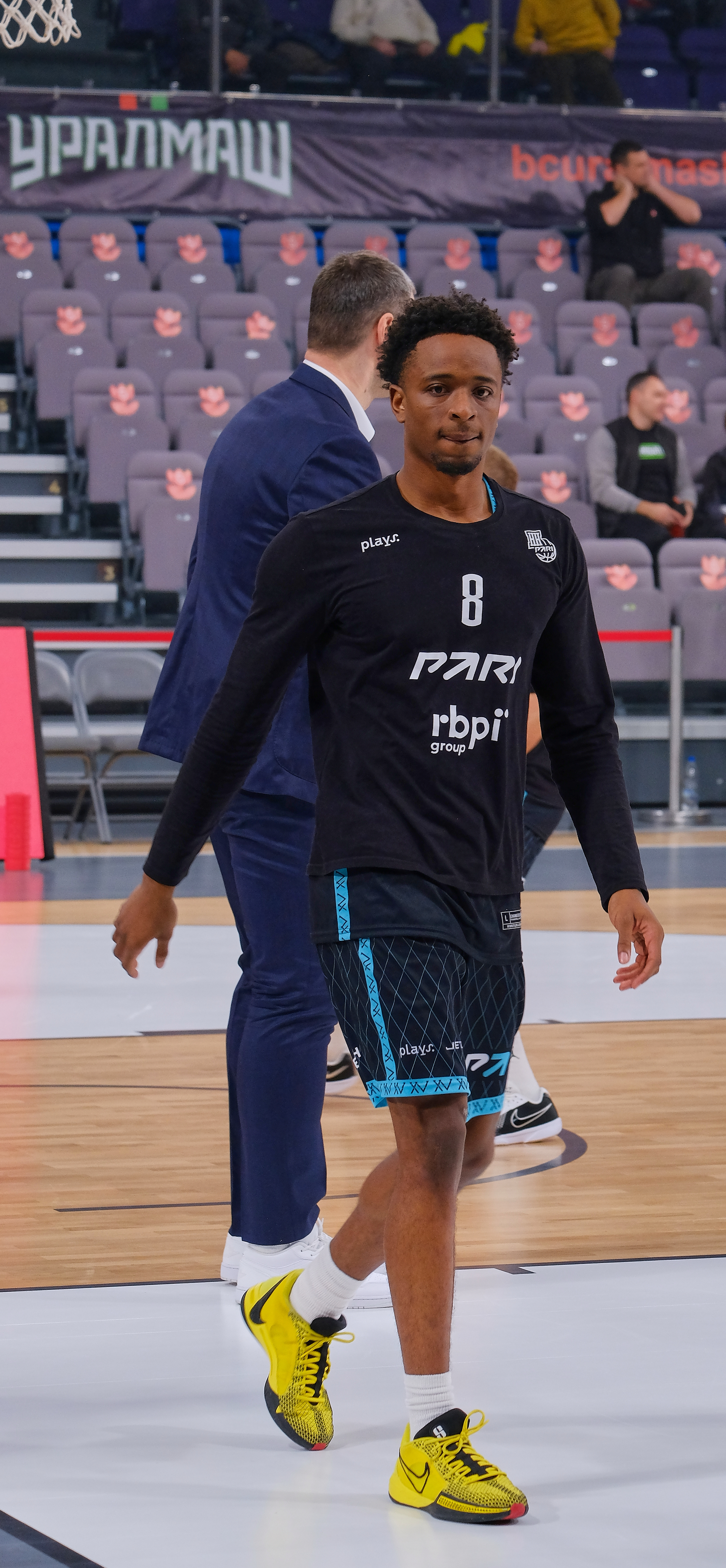
- Nutall in 2024

No. 10 – Tofaş
- Position: Point guard
- League: BSL; EuroCup

Personal information
- Born: December 16, 1999 (age 26)
- Listed height: 6 ft 3 in (1.91 m)
- Listed weight: 185 lb (84 kg)

Career information
- High school: Bryan (Bryan, Texas)
- College: Sam Houston State (2018–2021); SMU (2021–2023)
- NBA draft: 2023: undrafted
- Playing career: 2023–present

Career history
- 2023–2024: Široki
- 2024–2025: Nizhny Novgorod
- 2025: Beijing Ducks
- 2025–2026: Xinjiang Flying Tigers
- 2026–present: Tofaş

Career highlights
- Southland Player of the Year (2021); 2× First-team All-Southland (2020, 2021)

Zachary Markeith Nutall (born December 16, 1999) is an American professional basketball player for Tofaş of the Basketbol Süper Ligi (BSL) and the EuroCup. In college he played for Sam Houston State then SMU, and was named the 2021 Southland Conference Player of the Year.

== High school career ==
Nutall attended Bryan High School in Bryan, Texas, where he was named District 18-5A Offensive MVP as a senior.

== College career ==
As a freshman at Sam Houston State, Nutall averaged 6.6 points and 3.2 rebounds per game in a reserve role. He averaged 15.4 points and 4.4 rebounds per game in his sophomore season, earning First Team All-Southland honors. On November 25, 2020, Nutall scored a career-high 36 points in a 97–67 loss to SMU. As a junior, he averaged 19.3 points and 5.7 rebounds per game and was named Southland Player of the Year. For his senior season, Nutall transferred to SMU.

== Professional career ==
After going undrafted in the 2023 NBA draft, Nutall signed with Široki of the Basketball Championship of Bosnia and Herzegovina on August 5, 2023.

On July 1, 2024, Nutall signed with Nizhny Novgorod of the VTB United League. On February 19, 2025, he parted ways with the team. On February 27, he signed with Beijing Ducks of the Chinese Basketball Association (CBA).

On October 26, 2025, Zach signed with Xinjiang Flying Tigers of the Chinese Basketball Association (CBA).

On June 25, 2026, he signed with Tofaş of the Basketbol Süper Ligi (BSL).

== Career statistics ==
Legend
GP	Games played	GS	Games started	MPG	Minutes per game
FG%	Field goal percentage	3P%	3-point field goal percentage	FT%	Free throw percentage
RPG	Rebounds per game	APG	Assists per game	SPG	Steals per game
BPG	Blocks per game	PPG	Points per game	**Bold**	Career high

=== College ===
Year	Team	GP	GS	MPG	FG%	3P%	FT%	RPG	APG	SPG	BPG	PPG
2018–19	Sam Houston State	**33**	1	17.1	**.459**	**.372**	.577	3.2	.9	.6	.3	6.6
2019–20	Sam Houston State	30	30	30.1	.454	.328	.729	4.4	2.0	**1.5**	.2	15.4
2020–21	Sam Houston State	28	28	29.2	.439	**.372**	.696	**5.7**	1.8	1.0	.3	**19.3**
2021–22	SMU	**33**	29	24.0	.352	.325	.528	3.7	1.5	.5	.1	6.8
2022–23	SMU	32	**32**	**31.7**	.390	.326	**.765**	2.9	**2.7**	1.1	**.4**	13.2
Career		156	120	26.2	.422	.343	.699	3.9	1.8	.9	.3	11.9
