= 1999 Sun Belt Conference men's basketball tournament =

- Classification: Division I
- Season: 1998–99
- Teams: 8
- Site: Cajundome; Lafayette, LA
- Champions: Arkansas State (1st title)
- Winning coach: Dickey Nutt (1st title)
- MVP: Chico Fletcher (Arkansas State)

1998–99 Sun Belt Conference men's basketball standings
	Conf.				Overall
Team	W		L	PCT	W		L	PCT
Louisiana Tech	10	–	4	.714	19	–	9	.679
Arkansas State †	9	–	5	.643	18	–	12	.600
Florida International	7	–	7	.500	13	–	16	.448
SW Louisiana	7	–	7	.500	13	–	16	.448
Western Kentucky	7	–	7	.500	13	–	16	.448
South Alabama	6	–	8	.429	11	–	16	.407
New Orleans	5	–	9	.357	14	–	16	.467
Arkansas-Little Rock	5	–	9	.357	12	–	15	.444
† 1999 Sun Belt Conference tournament winner Rankings from AP Poll

The 1999 Sun Belt Conference men's basketball tournament was held February 27–March 2 at the Cajundome at the University of Southwestern Louisiana in Lafayette, Louisiana.

Arkansas State defeated Western Kentucky in the championship game, 65–48, to win their first Sun Belt men's basketball tournament.

The Indians, in turn, received an automatic bid to the 1999 NCAA tournament, their first appearance in the Division I event. No other Sun Belt members earned bids to the tournament.

== Format ==
The Sun Belt once again saw changes in its membership; three teams departed the conference, Jacksonville (TAAC), Lamar (Southland), and Texas–Pan American (Independent), while one was added, Florida International (TAAC). Total membership reduced from ten to eight.

With the membership changes came some slight modifications to the tournament format. All eight teams, seeded based on regular season conference records, were now placed directly into the initial quarterfinal round as part of a single-elimination style bracket.

== Bracket ==
Quarterfinals; Saturday, February 27
1	Louisiana Tech	68
8	Arkansas–Little Rock	66
5	Western Kentucky	80
4	SW Louisiana	73
3	Florida International	65
6	South Alabama	57
7	New Orleans	53
2	Arkansas State	70

Semifinals; Sunday, February 28
1	Louisiana Tech	66
5	Western Kentucky	76
3	Florida International	69
2	Arkansas State	87

Championship; Tuesday, March 2
5	Western Kentucky	48
2	Arkansas State	65

== See also ==
- Sun Belt Conference women's basketball tournament
