= Keon Thompson =

American basketball player (born 2002)

- Thompson with Manchester Basketball in 2026

No. 5 – Manchester Basketball
- Position: Point guard
- League: SBL

Personal information
- Born: October 9, 2002 (age 24) Merrillville, Indiana, U.S.
- Listed height: 6 ft 1 in (1.85 m)
- Listed weight: 200 lb (91 kg)

Career information
- High school: Merrillville (Merrillville, Indiana); Hargrave Military Academy (Chatham, Virginia)
- College: UMass (2022–2024); Stephen F. Austin (2024–2026)
- NBA draft: 2026: undrafted
- Playing career: 2026–present

Career history
- 2026–present: Manchester Basketball

Career highlights
- Southland Player of the Year (2026); First-team All-Southland (2026)

Keon Thompson Jr. (born October 9, 2002) is an American professional basketball player for Manchester Basketball of the Super League Basketball (SLB). He played college basketball for the UMass Minutemen and the Stephen F. Austin Lumberjacks.

== High school career ==
Thompson played three years of high school basketball at Merrillville High School in Merrillville, Indiana. He averaged 21.4 points, 6.2 rebounds and 2.4 assists per game as a sophomore. Thompson averaged 31 points, 10 rebounds and 2 assists per game as a junior and scored 1,353 points, becoming the school's all-time leading scorer. He did a postgraduate season at Hargrave Military Academy and played for the Tigers, earning second-team All-American honors. He committed to play college basketball at UMass and was primarily recruited by assistant coach Will Bailey.

== College career ==
Thompson started nine games as a freshman at UMass and averaged 5.8 points, 2.0 rebounds, and 2.7 assists per game. As a sophomore, he started 30 games and averaged 9.3 points, 3.8 rebounds, and 3.0 assists per game. Thompson transferred to Stephen F. Austin after his sophomore season. He averaged 13.5 points and 5.2 rebounds per game as a junior. On February 14, 2026, Thompson scored a career-high 32 points in a win against UT Rio Grande Valley and earned his fifth consecutive Southland Player of the Week nod. As a senior, Thompson averaged 18.5 points and 4.8 rebounds per game. He was named Southland Player of the Year.

== Professional career ==
=== Manchester Basketball (2026–present) ===
On August 3, 2026, Thompson signed with Manchester Basketball of the British Super League Basketball (SLB).
