= Jason Jennings (basketball) =

American basketball player (born 1979)

Personal information
- Born: April 18, 1979 (age 47) Bald Knob, Arkansas, U.S.
- Listed height: 7 ft 0 in (2.13 m)
- Listed weight: 250 lb (113 kg)

Career information
- High school: Bald Knob (Bald Knob, Arkansas)
- College: Arkansas (1997–1999); Arkansas State (2000–2002)
- NBA draft: 2002: 2nd round, 43rd overall pick
- Drafted by: Portland Trail Blazers
- Position: Center

Career highlights
- Sun Belt Defensive Player of the Year (2002)
- Stats at Basketball Reference

Jason Jennings (born April 18, 1979) is an American professional basketball player. After attending college at Arkansas State University, Jennings was the 43rd pick of the 2002 NBA draft, selected by the Portland Trail Blazers. He subsequently chose to play professionally in Europe. Jennings is 1 of 9 players selected in the 2002 NBA Draft that never played a game in the NBA.

== College career ==
Jennings began his college career at the University of Arkansas. The 7-foot, 250-pound center blocked 25 shots in his freshman year, scoring a personal-best 17 points against Bethune-Cookman. He started 17 of 31 games in his sophomore season, averaging 4.3 points on 56.7% shooting and 2.7 rebounds per game, and accumulating 36 blocked shots. Jennings scored a season-high 12 points against Mississippi State.

After his sophomore year, Jennings transferred to Arkansas State, where he sat out 1999–2000 season as required by NCAA transfer guidelines.

Playing as a junior, he was named to the Second Team All-District 8 by the National Association of Basketball Coaches. Jennings set a school record with 102 blocks (3.5 blocks per game, good for 8th in the nation). He led his team in scoring, with 13.9 points per game and leading the team in 7 games, and rebounding, with 7.1 rebounds per game and team-best 12 times. Jennings achieved the first triple-double in school history, with 31 points, 10 rebounds and 11 blocks against Morris Brown College.

In his senior season, Jennings averaged 14.6 points, 6.6 rebounds and 3.4 blocks (8th in nation) per game. He totaled 29 points, 13 rebounds and six blocks against Denver. He was selected to the All-Tournament team at the Outrigger Rainbow Classic after averaging 17.0 points, 6.7 rebounds and 5.3 blocks against Georgia, Boston College and Portland.

== Career highlights ==
- Two-time All-Sun Belt Selection
- First player in conference history to post two 100-block seasons
- Scored in double figures in 48 of 59 games at Arkansas State
- Second in school history in blocks (203)
- Sun Belt Conference Defensive Player of the Year (2002)
