= Larry Jeffries =

American basketball player

Personal information
- Listed height: 6 ft 3 in (1.91 m)

Career information
- High school: Alton (Alton, Illinois)
- College: Trinity (Texas) (1965–1969)
- NBA draft: 1969: 6th round, 75th overall pick
- Drafted by: Detroit Pistons
- Position: Forward

Career highlights
- First-team NCAA College Division All-American (1969); 2× Southland Player of the Year (1967, 1969); 4× All-Southland (1966–1969)
- Stats at Basketball Reference

Larry Jeffries is an American former basketball player who is best known for his collegiate career at Trinity University in San Antonio, Texas, between 1966 and 1969. He is 6 ft 3 in (1.91 m), played the forward position and secured himself as one of the greatest players in Southland Conference men's basketball history. He was a two-time Southland Conference Player of the Year, four-time all-conference selection and a consensus First Team NCAA College Division All-American in his senior year. His 2,464 points are the most in school history and he also holds many other records at Trinity. He was selected in the 1969 NBA draft by the Detroit Pistons as well as the 1969 ABA Draft by the Denver Nuggets.

== Career ==
Jeffries grew up in Illinois and attended Alton High School in Alton, Illinois. While playing for the Alton Redbirds he was named the area's most valuable player as a senior in 1964–65.

He enrolled at Trinity University, a Division II school at the time, and went on to spearhead one of the most successful time periods in the program's early history. Over the four years that Jeffries played for the Tigers they had a cumulative record of 69 wins and 28 losses. In 1968–69, after compiling a 19–5 record and winning the conference, Trinity earned a berth into the 1969 NCAA Men's Division I Basketball Tournament (the Southland Conference had its first season as a Division I conference in 1968–69 and Trinity became the first team to represent them in the tournament). The Tigers lost to Texas A&M in the opening round, 81–66.

Jeffries, who would later be inducted into Trinity's Hall of Fame in 1999, secured many records and accolades during his playing career. In all four seasons he was named to the All-Conference Team, was the Southland Conference Rookie of the Year as a freshman, earned two player of the year awards in 1967 and 1969, was named the Junior of the Year in 1968, and earned three All-American distinctions between 1967 and 1969 (becoming a consensus First Team All-American in his senior season). His still-standing single season school records include the top three scoring totals (813 points being the most), the top two field goals made totals (320, 239), the top field goal attempts (616), the top three free throws made (173 as the most), and all top four free throw attempts records (232 as the most). Among his career school records are the most points (2,454), second-most rebounds (1,013), most field goals made (922) and attempted (1,727), and most free throws made (598) and attempted (814). Among his school single game records are points (46, tied), field goals made (18, tied) and free throws attempted (22, tied). Jeffries was also on squads that set team records for points in a single game (126), field goals made (53), free throws made (34) and attempted (48). During his junior season in 1967–68, the Tigers set still-standing team season records for points (2,756), field goals (1,105), free throws made (546) and attempted (776), and rebounds (1,500).

After his collegiate career, Jeffries was selected in both the 1969 NBA draft and 1969 ABA Draft by the Detroit Pistons and Denver Nuggets, respectively.
