= Kevon Harris =

American basketball player (born 1997)

No. 0 – Shinshu Brave Warriors
- Position: Shooting guard
- League: B.League

Personal information
- Born: June 24, 1997 (age 29) Ellenwood, Georgia, U.S.
- Listed height: 6 ft 5 in (1.96 m)
- Listed weight: 215 lb (98 kg)

Career information
- High school: Martin Luther King Jr. (Lithonia, Georgia); DME Academy (Daytona Beach, Florida)
- College: Stephen F. Austin (2016–2020)
- NBA draft: 2020: undrafted
- Playing career: 2020–present

Career history
- 2020-2022: Raptors 905
- 2021: Zadar
- 2022–2024: Orlando Magic
- 2022–2024: →Lakeland / Osceola Magic
- 2024–2025: College Park Skyhawks
- 2025: Rio Grande Valley Vipers
- 2025–2026: Xinjiang Flying Tigers
- 2026–present: Shinshu Brave Warriors

Career highlights
- 2× NBA G League Next Up Game (2024, 2025); NBA G League Next Up Game MVP (2025); Southland Player of the Year (2020); First-team All-Southland (2020); 2× Second-team All-Southland (2018, 2019)
- Stats at NBA.com
- Stats at Basketball Reference

Kevon Lavelle Harris (/ˈkiːvɒn/ KEE-von; born June 24, 1997) is an American professional basketball player for the Shinshu Brave Warriors of the Japanese B.League. He played college basketball for the Stephen F. Austin Lumberjacks.

== Early life ==
Harris was born and grew up in Ellenwood, Georgia and attended Martin Luther King Jr. High School. As a senior, he averaged 15.8 points and 11.8 rebounds per game and led the team to a 24–6 record and the Class 5A state semifinal. After high school, Harris completed a postgraduate year at DME Academy in Daytona Beach, Florida. He signed with Stephen F. Austin for college basketball over offers from Utah State, Texas A&M and UT-Arlington.

== College career ==
Harris became a starter for the Lumberjacks during his true freshman season, averaging 8.5 points and 3.6 rebounds per game. As a sophomore, he averaged 14.5 points, 5.5 rebounds, 1.3 assists per game and was named second team All-Southland Conference. Harris averaged 17.8 points, 6.5 rebounds, 2.0 assists, 1.0 steals as a junior and was again named second team All-Southland Conference. He surpassed the 1,000 point milestone during the season. He initially declared for the 2019 NBA draft, but opted to return to Stephen F. Austin for his senior season. Harris became the school's all-time leading scorer at the Division I level on February 19, during a 14-point performance in a win over Central Arkansas, passing Thomas Walkup. Following the end of the regular season, Harris was named the Southland Conference Men's Basketball Player of the Year and first team All-Southland Conference. He finished fourth in the conference in scoring with 17.5 points per game and also averaged 5.7 rebounds, 2.1 assists, and 1.5 steals per game.

== Professional career ==
=== Raptors 905 (2020–2022) ===
After going undrafted in the 2020 NBA draft, Harris was selected 11th overall in the January 2021 NBA G League draft by the Raptors 905.

On August 20, 2021, Harris signed with Zadar of the HT Premijer liga and the ABA League. On October 6, 2021, he parted ways with Zadar. Harris rejoined the Raptors 905 in October 2021.

=== Orlando Magic (2022–2024) ===
Harris joined the Minnesota Timberwolves in the 2022 NBA Summer League. In his Summer League debut, Harris scored thirteen points in a 85–77 win over the Denver Nuggets.

On July 25, 2022, Harris signed with the Orlando Magic on a two-way contract. On December 29, he was suspended by the NBA for one game without pay due to coming off the bench during an altercation in a game against the Detroit Pistons the day before.

=== College Park Skyhawks (2024–2025) ===
On September 18, 2024, Harris signed an Exhibit 10 deal with the Atlanta Hawks, but was waived on October 18. On October 26, he joined the College Park Skyhawks.

On March 1, 2025, Harris signed a 10-day contract with the Hawks. He did not appear in a game before his contract was terminated on March 4, when Atlanta signed Dominick Barlow to a standard contract.

=== Rio Grande Valley Vipers (2025) ===
On July 3, 2025, Harris signed a two-way contract with the Houston Rockets. He was waived by Houston on December 2 following the signing of Tyler Smith, having played for the Rio Grande Valley Vipers, but never appearing in a game for the parent club Rockets.

=== Xinjiang Flying Tigers (2025–present) ===
On December 14, 2025, Harris signed with the Xinjiang Flying Tigers of the Chinese Basketball Association (CBA).

== Career statistics ==
Legend
GP	Games played	GS	Games started	MPG	Minutes per game
FG%	Field goal percentage	3P%	3-point field goal percentage	FT%	Free throw percentage
RPG	Rebounds per game	APG	Assists per game	SPG	Steals per game
BPG	Blocks per game	PPG	Points per game	**Bold**	Career high

=== NBA ===
Year	Team	GP	GS	MPG	FG%	3P%	FT%	RPG	APG	SPG	BPG	PPG
2022–23	Orlando	**34**	0	**13.4**	.439	.372	.756	**2.1**	**.5**	**.5**	**.1**	**4.1**
2023–24	Orlando	2	0	3.0	**.667**	—	—	1.0	**.5**	.0	.0	2.0
Career		36	0	12.9	.445	.372	.756	2.0	.5	.5	.1	4.0
