= Marvin Speight =

American basketball player and coach

Marvin Speight (September 5, 1921 – March 13, 2017) was an American basketball coach who served as head coach at Arkansas State University.

Born in Hickory Plains, Arkansas, Speight went on to be a standout at Beebe High School and played collegiately at the University of Central Arkansas. His collegiate career was split due to his service in World War II.

== Coaching career ==
=== High school ===
After college, Speight went on to take the head coaching job at tiny Moro High School in eastern Arkansas where he held the position of head basketball coach. He left Moro to take the coaching job at Searcy High School.

=== ASU-Beebe ===
Speight was offered the head coaching position at what is now Arkansas State University-Beebe in 1953. He would find success at Beebe the town where he played high school ball. He remained at ASU-Beebe until 1963 when he took the job at Arkansas State University in Jonesboro, Arkansas.

=== Arkansas State University ===
Speight took over for John Rauth in 1963 at Arkansas State and guided the Indians to several postseason appearances, with their best season coming in the 1966 campaign. Speight also coached ASU star Jerry Rook for Rook's final two seasons. Speight remained with the school until 1969 when he stepped down to engage in teaching full-time.
