= Steve Brooks (basketball) =

American basketball player (1950–2022)

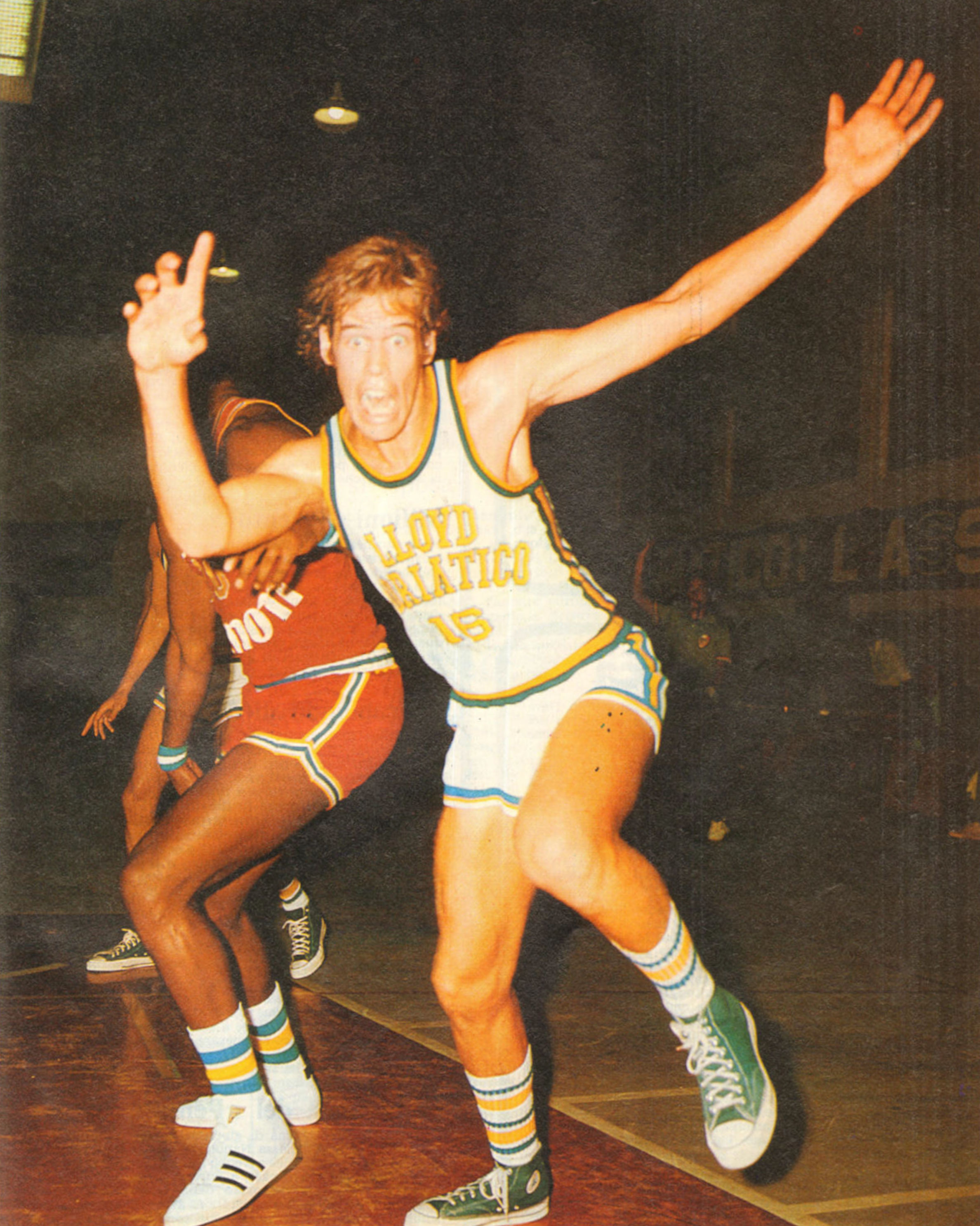
- Brooks playing for SG Triestina in 1974

Personal information
- Born: November 18, 1950 St. Louis, Missouri, U.S.
- Died: December 18, 2022 (aged 72) Tampa, Florida, U.S.
- Listed height: 6 ft 9 in (2.06 m)
- Listed weight: 220 lb (100 kg)

Career information
- High school: McCluer (Florissant, Missouri)
- College: Arkansas State (1969–1974)
- NBA draft: 1974: 8th round, 131st overall pick
- Drafted by: Houston Rockets
- Position: Center

Career highlights
- Southland Player of the Year (1974); 2× First-team All-Southland (1972, 1974); Second-team All-Southland (1971)
- Stats at Basketball Reference

Stephen Robert Brooks (November 18, 1950 – December 18, 2022) was an American professional basketball player. He played college basketball for the Arkansas State Red Wolves from 1969 to 1974 and was the Southland Player of the Year in 1974. Brooks was selected by the Houston Rockets in the 1974 NBA draft and played professionally overseas.

== Early life and college career ==
Brooks was born in St. Louis, Missouri, as the oldest of four sons to parents Robert and Shirley. He attended McCluer High School in Florissant, Missouri.

Brooks accepted a full scholarship to attend Arkansas State University and play for the Arkansas State Red Wolves. He was selected to the All-Southland Conference second-team in 1971 and first-team in 1972. Brooks did not play during the 1972–73 season. He was awarded as the Southland Conference Men's Basketball Player of the Year and selected to the All-Southland first-team in 1974.

Brooks ranks ninth on Arkansas State's career scoring list and sixth on the career rebounds list. He was inducted into the Arkansas State University Athletics Hall of Honor in 1995. Brooks was named to the Southland Conference 1970s All-Decade Team in 2013.

== Professional playing career ==
Brooks was selected in the 8th round of the 1974 NBA draft by the Houston Rockets. He was selected in the fifth round of the 1974 ABA draft by the Utah Stars. Brooks played professionally in Italy and the Philippines before he decided to focus on private business.

== Later career ==
Brooks was an entrepreneur and worked in the security, hardware and hospitality industries for 45 years. He was the senior vice president of three businesses in St. Louis for over 20 years. He relocated to Florida where he founded his final business, a hotel operating supplies company, at the age of 60.

== Personal life ==
Brooks was married to his wife for 50 years and had two sons. He was a member of Salem United Methodist Church in St. Louis and Journey Christian Church in Orlando, Florida.

Brooks died on December 18, 2022, in Tampa, Florida.
