= Jerry Rook =

American basketball player and coach (1943–2019)

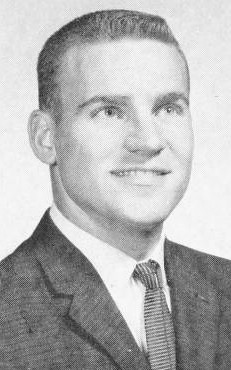

Personal information
- Born: October 27, 1943 Jonesboro, Arkansas, U.S.
- Died: August 25, 2019 (aged 75) Jonesboro, Arkansas, U.S.
- Listed height: 6 ft 5 in (1.96 m)
- Listed weight: 219 lb (99 kg)

Career information
- High school: Nettleton (Jonesboro, Arkansas)
- College: Arkansas State (1961–1965)
- NBA draft: 1965: 14th round, 97th overall pick
- Drafted by: Baltimore Bullets
- Playing career: 1969–1970
- Position: Forward
- Number: 22

Career history
- 1969–1970: New Orleans Buccaneers

Career highlights
- 2× Southland Player of the Year (1964, 1965); 2× First-team All-Southland (1964, 1965)
- Stats at Basketball Reference

Jerry G. Rook (October 27, 1943 – August 25, 2019) was an American basketball player, best known for his success at Arkansas State University. He played one season for the New Orleans Buccaneers in the American Basketball Association (ABA).

== High school ==
Rook was born and raised in rural Arkansas. He attended Nettleton High School in Jonesboro. The school system was so small that all elementary, junior high and high school students shared the same three-story school building. As a basketball player for Nettleton, Rook was voted All-Conference and All-District three times (1959–61). He was twice named All-State (1960, 1961) and, his senior season of 1960–61, Scholastic Magazine named him an All-American. Rook was also named the State Tournament MVP that year after his team finished 40–3 and as state champions (he scored 52 points in the state final and 144 points in the state tournament). The previous season, Nettleton had finished as state runners-up.

Rook finished his prep career with 3,103 points. Mississippi State and Kentucky were both interested in him, but a decision to stay close to home kept Rook in his home state.

On February 24, 2009, Rook's high school jersey number (#33) was retired at Nettleton. A banner commemorating some of his major achievements was also unveiled and is now a permanent fixture in the gymnasium.

== Arkansas State College ==
Though Rook would have gained more exposure playing at a higher-level Division I school such as Kentucky (then coached by Hall of Famer Adolph Rupp), he instead played for John Rauth's Indians.

As a true freshman in 1961–62, Rook averaged 19.8 points to lead the team in scoring (a feat he would accomplish for all four years). He averaged 22 points as a sophomore the following season. At the conclusion of that year, however, coach Rauth departed and Rook played the final two seasons under Marvin Speight. Rook averaged 25 points per game as a junior (1963–64) and then 23 as a senior (1964–65).

During Rook's career, ASC moved into the Southland Conference, giving him the opportunity to earn Southland Conference Player of the Year twice (he was, coincidentally, the recipient of the league's first two awards). ASC advanced to NCAA Division II regional play twice during his career. Rook's highest-scoring game came during his sophomore season when he scored 43 points against Louisiana College. He scored 35 or more points in 11 other games, including a 39-point outing against Lamar University during his senior season. Additionally, he put up those numbers more than 20 years before there was a three-point line in college basketball. Rook estimated that one-third or more of his 816 field goals at ASC would have been three-pointers.

Jerry Rook finished his collegiate career as the holder of many Arkansas State University records. Among them, his 2,153 career points, 22.9 points per game average, and 816 field goals made are all still number one.

== Professional ==
He was drafted by the Baltimore Bullets in the 14th round (1st pick, 97th overall) of the 1965 NBA draft, although he never made any final NBA rosters. Rook's professional career lasted one season (1969–70) as a member of the New Orleans Buccaneers in the relatively new American Basketball Association (ABA). At the time, the maximum salary a player could hope to earn was $65,000 per year. That money, coupled with the decision that he would rather stay close to home without needing to constantly travel, led Rook to forgo any more professional basketball aspirations.

== Later life ==
Rook returned to Arkansas and launched a successful high school coaching career that included stops at Stuttgart and Pine Bluff, among others. He led Pine Bluff to two state championships (including an overall title) and coached in the State All-Star Game multiple times. He later coached at Brookland.

On February 13, 2009, Rook was inducted into the Arkansas Sports Hall of Fame.

Battling numerous health issues for years, Jerry Rook died on August 25, 2019, surrounded by family in Jonesboro, Arkansas.
