= Dan Henderson (basketball) =

American basketball player

Personal information
- Born: Memphis, Tennessee, U.S.
- Listed height: 6 ft 7 in (2.01 m)
- Listed weight: 225 lb (102 kg)

Career information
- High school: Carver (Memphis, Tennessee)
- College: Arkansas State (1973–1977)
- NBA draft: 1977: 3rd round, 59th overall pick
- Drafted by: San Antonio Spurs
- Position: Forward / center

Career highlights
- Southland Player of the Year (1977); 2× First-team All-Southland (1976, 1977); Second-team All-Southland (1975)
- Stats at Basketball Reference

Dan Henderson is an American former basketball player. He played college basketball for the Arkansas State Indians and was the Southland Player of the Year in 1977. Henderson was selected in the third round of the 1977 NBA draft by the San Antonio Spurs.

== Playing career ==
Henderson is a native of Memphis, Tennessee, and attended Carver High School. He was recruited to play for the Arkansas State Indians as a forward but was moved to center due to a lack of height on the team. Henderson averaged 12.0 points and a team-high 9.8 rebounds per game during the 1974–75 season; he was selected to the All-Southland Conference second-team. He was shifted to his natural forward position for the 1975–76 season, and averaged 23 points per game to earn All-Southland first-team honors. Henderson was moved back to center for the 1976–77 season. He averaged 21.6 points and 10.4 rebounds per game, and earned the Southland Player of the Year award and a second All-Southland first-team selection.

Henderson was selected in the third round of the 1977 NBA draft by the San Antonio Spurs. He signed with the Spurs on July 20, 1977, and played during preseason with the team.

Henderson was inducted into the Arkansas State Athletics Hall of Honor in 1995. He ranks sixth in scoring (1,543) and fourth in rebounding (910) in Arkansas State basketball history.
