= John Dickson (basketball) =

American basketball player

Personal information
- Born: November 18, 1945 (age 80) Searcy, Arkansas, U.S.
- Listed height: 6 ft 10 in (2.08 m)
- Listed weight: 240 lb (109 kg)

Career information
- High school: Jonesboro (Jonesboro, Arkansas)
- College: Arkansas State (1963–1967)
- NBA draft: 1967: 2nd round, 22nd overall pick
- Drafted by: Chicago Bulls
- Playing career: 1967–1968
- Position: Center
- Number: 31

Career history
- 1967–1968: New Orleans Buccaneers

Career highlights
- Southland Player of the Year (1966)
- Stats at Basketball Reference

John Dickson (born November 18, 1945) is an American former basketball player who played for the New Orleans Buccaneers of the American Basketball Association (ABA). While playing college basketball for the Arkansas State Red Wolves, Dickson was named the Southland Conference Men's Basketball Player of the Year. In his one season in the ABA, he averaged 1.7 points per game and 1.6 rebounds per game.

== Career statistics ==
Legend
GP	Games played	GS	Games started	MPG	Minutes per game
FG%	Field goal percentage	3P%	3-point field goal percentage	FT%	Free throw percentage
RPG	Rebounds per game	APG	Assists per game	SPG	Steals per game
BPG	Blocks per game	PPG	Points per game	**Bold**	Career high

=== ABA ===
==== Regular season ====
Year	Team	GP	MPG	FG%	3P%	FT%	RPG	APG	PPG
1967–68	New Orleans	21	4.8	.359	–	.615	1.6	.1	1.7

==== Playoffs ====
Year	Team	GP	MPG	FG%	3P%	FT%	RPG	APG	PPG
1968	New Orleans	1	3.0	.000	–	–	2.0	.0	.0
