= Chico Fletcher =

American basketball player (born 1977)

Personal information
- Born: October 25, 1977 (age 49) Osceola, Arkansas, U.S.
- Listed height: 5 ft 6 in (1.68 m)
- Listed weight: 170 lb (77 kg)

Career information
- High school: Osceola (Osceola, Arkansas)
- College: Arkansas State (1996–2000)
- NBA draft: 2000: undrafted
- Position: Point guard

Career highlights
- Honorable mention All-American – AP (1999); 2× Sun Belt Player of the Year (1998, 1999); 3× All-Sun Belt (1998–2000); Sun Belt tournament MVP (1999)

Chico Fletcher (born October 25, 1977) is an American former basketball player who is best known for his collegiate career at Arkansas State University. Between 1996–97 and 1999–2000, Fletcher recorded 893 assists, which at the time of his graduation was the 11th highest total in NCAA Division I history. He was twice named the Sun Belt Conference Men's Basketball Player of the Year, and as a junior he led the Red Wolves to their first ever, and so far only NCAA tournament appearance.

Fletcher is 5'6" tall, weighs 170 pounds and played the point guard position. A native of Osceola, Arkansas, he was recruited by Arkansas State to play for their football team. He redshirted his true freshman football season in 1996 due to a left shoulder injury, but then decided to try out for the men's basketball team as a walk-on. He made the team, and by midway through the 1996–97 season Fletcher had become a key player. Fletcher started the final 20 games of the regular season and led the Sun Belt Conference with a 6.3 assist-per-game average.

As a sophomore the following season, Fletcher once again led the conference in assists as the Red Wolves compiled a 20–9 record, which was their first 20-win season in seven years. He was named all-conference as well as the Sun Belt Player of the Year. In 1998–99, his junior year, Fletcher's 17.0 points per game led the team and his 8.3 assists per game was the second best average in the nation behind Doug Gottlieb's 8.9. He also recorded 250 total assists during the season, and on November 23, 1998, had 17 in a game against TCU. Both of these totals still stand as school records. In the Sun Belt tournament's championship game against Western Kentucky, Fletcher scored 21 points, dished out eight assists, recorded three rebounds and had two steals in the win. He was named the Tournament MVP as Arkansas State gained the automatic bid into the 1999 NCAA tournament for the school's first ever appearance. Although they would lose to Utah in the first round, Fletcher had earned his second consecutive Sun Belt Player of the Year award. In Fletcher's final season, he once again averaged 8.3 assists per game, which was the third best average in Division I. The Red Wolves finished with a 10–18 record, however, and so he did not repeat the conference player of the year for a third consecutive season.

Fletcher was also passed up during the 2000 NBA draft, but he did manage to sign with the Sioux Falls Skyforce of the Continental Basketball Association. He played for the one season with the team.

== See also ==
- List of NCAA Division I men's basketball career assists leaders
