= Arkansas State Red Wolves men's basketball =

American college basketball team

| 2026–27 Arkansas State Red Wolves men's basketball team |
- University: Arkansas State University
- First season: 1926–27; 100 years ago
- Athletic director: Chris Pezman
- Head coach: Ryan Pannone; 2nd season, 20–12 (.625)
- Location: Jonesboro, Arkansas
- Arena: First National Bank Arena (capacity: 10,038)
- NCAA division: Division I
- Conference: Sun Belt Conference
- Nickname: Red Wolves
- Colors: Scarlet and black
- Student section: The Den
- All-time record: 1,322–1,269 (.510)
- NCAA tournament record: 0–1 (.000)

NCAA Division I tournament appearances
- 1999

Conference tournament champions
- 1999

Conference regular-season champions
- 1967, 1971, 1974, 1991, 1998, 2025

Conference division champions
- 1998, 2007, 2011, 2013

Uniforms
| Home | Away |

The Arkansas State Red Wolves men's basketball (formerly the Indians) team represents Arkansas State University in Jonesboro, Arkansas, United States. The school's team currently competes in the Sun Belt Conference. They play their home games at the First National Bank Arena. On March 30, 2025, Ryan Pannone was named the program’s 18th head coach. The Red Wolves made their first and to date only appearance in the NCAA tournament in 1999 after winning the 1999 Sun Belt Conference Championship. Their most notable alum is ‘Hoop Dreams’ star, Arthur Agee.

== History ==
Season results:

| Season | Head Coach | Overall | Conference | Standing | Postseason |
Sun Belt Conference
| 2012-13 | John Brady | 19–12 | 12–8 | 1st (West) | – |
| 2013-14 | John Brady | 19–13 | 10–8 | 4th of 10 | – |
| 2014-15 | John Brady | 11–18 | 6–14 | 10th of 11 | – |
| 2015-16 | John Brady | 11–20 | 7–13 | T-9th of 11 | – |
| 2016-17 | Grant McCasland | 20–12 | 11–7 | T-3rd of 12 | – |
| 2017-18 | Mike Balado | 11–21 | 6–12 | 11th of 12 | – |
| 2018-19 | Mike Balado | 13–19 | 7–11 | 9th of 12 | – |
| 2019-20 | Mike Balado | 16–16 | 8–12 | T-8th of 12 | – |
| 2020-21 | Mike Balado | 11–13 | 7–8 | 4th (West) | – |
| 2021-22 | Mike Balado | 18–11 | 8–7 | 6th of 12 | – |
| 2022-23 | Mike Balado | 13–20 | 4–14 | 13th of 14 | – |
| 2023-24 | Bryan Hodgson | 20–17 | 11–7 | 4th of 14 | – |
| 2024-25 | Bryan Hodgson | 25–11 | 13–5 | T-1st of 14 | – |
| Totals | 13 Years 4 Coaches | 0-0 | 0–0 | 1 Conf. Championships | 0 Postseason Appearances |

== Postseason results ==
=== NCAA Division I Tournament results ===
The Red Wolves have appeared in one NCAA Division I Tournament. Their record is 0–1.

| Year | Seed | Round | Opponent | Result |
|---|---|---|---|---|
| 1999 | #15 | First Round | #2 Utah | L 58–80 |

=== NCAA Division II Tournament results ===
The Red Wolves have appeared in six NCAA Division II Tournaments. Their combined record is 5–7.

| Year | Round | Opponent | Result |
|---|---|---|---|
| 1958 | Regional semifinals Regional 3rd-place game | Regis; Centenary | L 47–48; W 83–70 |
| 1960 | Regional semifinals Regional 3rd-place game | Evansville; Buffalo | L 74–91; L 52–53 |
| 1962 | Regional semifinals Regional Finals | Lamar; Southeast Missouri State | W 66–65; L 64–76 |
| 1963 | Regional semifinals Regional 3rd-place game | Lamar; Southeast Missouri State | L 88–89; W 77–75 |
| 1966 | Regional semifinals Regional 3rd-place game | Missouri State; Jackson State | L 71–72; W 84–77 |
| 1967 | Regional semifinals Regional 3rd-place game | Lincoln (MO); Arkansas AM&N | L 80–93; W 105–93 |

=== NAIA Tournament results ===
The Red Wolves have appeared in two NAIA Tournaments. Their combined record is 0–2.

| Year | Round | Opponent | Result |
|---|---|---|---|
| 1947 | First round | Beloit | L 60–75 |
| 1949 | First round | Hamline | L 43–76 |

=== NIT results ===
The Red Wolves have appeared in the National Invitation Tournament (NIT) five times. Their combined record is 5–5.

| Year | Round | Opponent | Result |
|---|---|---|---|
| 1987 | First round | Arkansas | L 64–67 |
| 1988 | First round Second Round; Quarterfinals | Louisiana–Monroe; Stanford; Colorado State | W 70–54; W 60–59; L 49–69 |
| 1989 | First round | Nebraska | L 79–81 |
| 1991 | First round Second Round; Quarterfinals | Rice; Memphis; Colorado | W 78–71; W 58–57; L 75–81 |
| 2025 | First round Second Round | Saint Louis; North Texas | W 103–78; L 63–65 |

=== CBI results ===
The Red Wolves have appeared in the College Basketball Invitational (CBI) once. Their combined record is 2–1.

| Year | Round | Opponent | Result |
|---|---|---|---|
| 2024 | First round Quarterfinals; Semifinals | Bethune–Cookman; Montana; High Point | W 86–85; W 74–61; L 80–81 |

== Notable players ==
=== Red Wolves in the NBA ===
Arkansas State has had 3 former players who have gone on to play in the NBA.

| Name | Years in NBA |
|---|---|
| John Dickson | 1968 |
| Patrick Eddie | 1992 |
| Jerry Rook | 1970 |

=== Conference players of the year ===
- Southland Conference POY
  - Jerry Rook (1964, 1965)
  - John Dickson (1966)
  - Allan Pruett (1971)
  - Steve Brooks (1974)
  - Dan Henderson (1977)
- Sun Belt Conference POY
  - Jeff Clifton (1994)
  - Chico Fletcher (1998, 1999)
  - Norchad Omier (2022)
