= Stephen F. Austin Lumberjacks basketball =

2026–27 Stephen F. Austin Lumberjacks basketball team
- University: Stephen F. Austin State University
- Head coach: Matt Braeuer (1st season)
- Location: Nacogdoches, Texas
- Arena: William R. Johnson Coliseum (capacity: 7,203)
- Conference: Southland
- Nickname: Lumberjacks
- Colors: Purple and white

NCAA Division I tournament round of 32
- 1983†, 2014, 2016*

NCAA Division I tournament appearances
- 1983†, 2009, 2014, 2015*, 2016*, 2018*

Conference tournament champions
- Southland: 2009, 2014, 2015*, 2016*, 2018*

Conference regular-season champions
- Southland: 1987, 2008, 2009, 2013, 2014, 2015*, 2016*, 2020, 2026; WAC: 2022

Uniforms
Home	Away
- † at Division II level * appearances vacated by NCAA

The Stephen F. Austin Lumberjacks basketball team is the men's basketball team that represents Stephen F. Austin State University (popularly abbreviated as SFA) in Nacogdoches, Texas, United States. Stephen F. Austin is currently led by head coach Matt Braeuer. The Lumberjacks have appeared five times in the NCAA Division I men's basketball tournament, most recently in 2018.

== History ==
In the 2013–2014 season, the men's basketball team had its most successful year in more than 2 decades, going 32–3 in the regular season and 18–0 in conference play. They won 29 games in a row, including the conference semi-final and finals, and the second round of the NCAA Tournament. SFA repeated the same feat in their 2015–2016 season by going 18–0 in conference and reaching the second round of the NCAA once again, but lost by Rex Pflueger's putback, which gave Notre Dame a 76–75 win over the Lumberjacks.

On May 20, 2020, following the discovery of an administrative error in certifying eligibility for student-athletes, Stephen F. Austin reached an agreement with the NCAA to vacate hundreds of wins across multiple sports from 2013 to 2019. This included all 117 men's basketball wins from the 2014 to 2015 and 2018 to 2019 seasons. As a result, three NCAA tournament appearances and three Southland conference titles were nullified.

SFA was one of four schools, all from Texas, that left the Southland Conference (SLC) on July 1, 2021, to join the Western Athletic Conference (WAC). SFA had previously played in the SLC since the 1987–88 season. SFA's affiliation with the WAC would only last three seasons, as it announced on May 29, 2024, that it would return to the SLC effective with the 2024–25 school year.

== Postseason appearances ==
=== NCAA Division I ===
The Lumberjacks have appeared in five NCAA tournaments. Their combined record is 2–5; however, as a result of their three vacated appearances, they have an "official" record of 1–2.

Year	Seed	Round	Opponent	Result
2009	#14	Round of 64	#3 Syracuse	L 44–59
2014	#12	Round of 64; Round of 32	#5 VCU #4 UCLA	W 77–75^{OT} L 60–77
2015	#12	Round of 64	#5 Utah	L 50–57*
2016	#14	Round of 64; Round of 32	#3 West Virginia #6 Notre Dame	W 70–56*; L 75–76*
2018	#14	Round of 64	#3 Texas Tech	L 60–70*

- appearances vacated by NCAA

=== NCAA Division II ===
During their time in NCAA Division II, the Lumberjacks appeared in the tournament once. Their combined record was 1–1.

Year	Round	Opponent	Result
1983	Round of 32; Regional Third Place	Central Missouri State; Tennessee–Martin	L 57–66; W 83–70

=== NIT results ===
The Lumberjacks have appeared in four National Invitation Tournaments (NIT). Their combined record is 1–4.

Year	Round	Opponent	Result
1987	First Round; Second Round	James Madison; Arkansas–Little Rock	W 70–63; L 48–54
2008	First Round	Massachusetts	L 60–80
2013	First Round	Stanford	L 57–58
2026	First Round	Tulsa	L 84–89^{OT}

=== CBI results ===
The Lumberjacks have appeared in the College Basketball Invitational (CBI) once. Their record is 0–1.

Year	Seed	Round	Opponent	Result
2022	#4	First Round	#13 UNC Asheville	L 68–80

=== CIT results ===
The Lumberjacks have appeared in one CollegeInsider.com Postseason Tournament (CIT). Their record is 0–1.

Year	Round	Opponent	Result
2017	First Round	Idaho	L 50–73

== Lumberjacks in the NBA ==
4 former Stephen F. Austin players have played at least one game in the NBA.

Name	Draft Year	Draft Team
Kevon Harris	2022	Undrafted
George Johnson	1970	Baltimore Bullets
James Silas	1972	Houston Rockets
Elvin Lowery	1959	[Detroit Pistons]]

== Lumberjacks playing in international leagues ==
- Shannon Bogues (born1997), in the French LNB Élite
- Kevon Harris (born 1997), in the Japanese B.League
- T. J. Holyfield (born 1995), in the Israeli Basketball Premier League
- Joirdon Nicholas (born 1999), in the Israeli Basketball Premier League
- Keon Thompson (born 2002), in the Super League Basketball
