= Southeastern Louisiana Lions basketball statistical leaders =

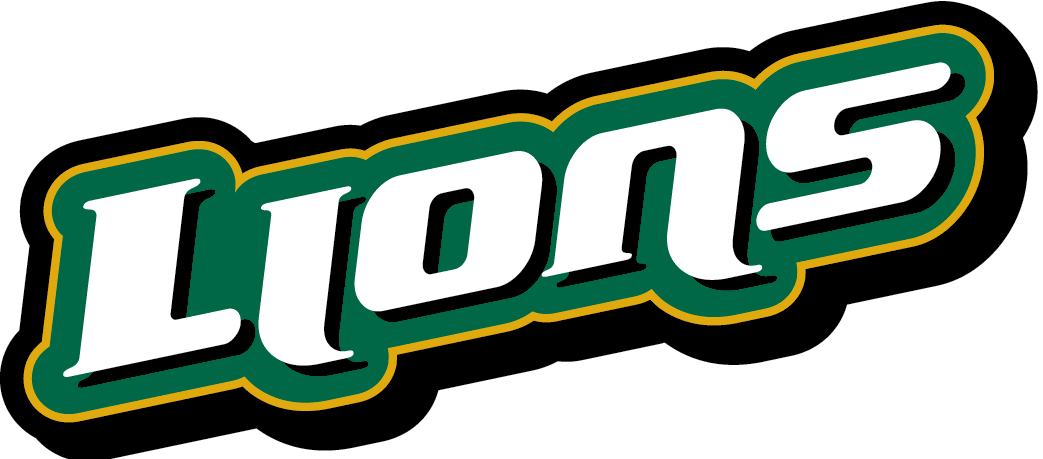

The Southeastern Louisiana Lions men's basketball statistical leaders are individual statistical leaders of the Southeastern Louisiana Lions men's basketball program in various categories, including points, assists, blocks, rebounds, and steals. Within those areas, the lists identify single-game, single-season, and career leaders. The Lions represent Southeastern Louisiana University in the NCAA's Southland Conference.

Southeastern Louisiana began competing in intercollegiate basketball in 1947. However, the school's record book does not generally list records from before the 1950s, as records from before this period are often incomplete and inconsistent. Since scoring was much lower in this era, and teams played much fewer games during a typical season, it is likely that few or no players from this era would appear on these lists anyway.

The NCAA did not officially record assists as a stat until the 1983–84 season, and blocks and steals until the 1985–86 season, but Southeastern Louisiana's record books includes players in these stats before these seasons. These lists are updated through the end of the 2020–21 season.

== Scoring ==
Career
Rk	Player	Points	Seasons
1	C.A. Core	2,046	1964–65 1965–66 1966–67 1967–68
2	Marlain Veal	1,666	2015–16 2016–17 2017–18 2018–19
3	Hank Washington	1,585	1990–91 1991–92 1992–93
4	Moses Greenwood	1,513	2015–16 2016–17 2017–18 2018–19
5	Nick Caldwell	1,412	2019–20 2020–21 2021–22 2022–23 2023–24
6	Don Wilson	1,398	1963–64 1964–65 1965–66 1966–67
7	Harvey Baker	1,352	1991–92 1992–93 1993–94 1994–95
8	Brandon Fortenberry	1,348	2008–09 2009–10 2010–11 2011–12 2012–13
9	Troy Green	1,320	1995–96 1996–97 1997–98 1998–99
10	Jerry Kelly	1,319	1979–80 1980–81 1981–82 1982–83

Season
Rk	Player	Points	Season
1	Sam Bowie	590	1995–96
2	Hank Washington	580	1992–93
3	Moses Greenwood	568	2018–19
4	Ricky Woods	566	2004–05
5	Sam Bowie	549	1994–95
6	C.A. Core	536	1964–65
7	Sam Hines Jr.	534	2024–25
8	Hank Washington	533	1991–92
9	Marlain Veal	525	2018–19
10	C.A. Core	521	1967–68

Single game
Rk	Player	Points	Season	Opponent
1	Jim McClain	43	1968–69	Mississippi College
2	Sam Bowie	39	1995–96	Central Florida
	Cedric Jenkins	39	2014–15	New Orleans
4	Gerald Jones	38	1986–87	Cal State-Bakersfield
5	Wallace Waddell	37	1960–61	Spring Hill
	Jerry Travis	37	1965–66	Univ. of Mexico
	C.A. Core	37	1965–66	Northwestern State
8	Tom Burke	36	1955–56	Louisiana College
	Bobby Perry	36	1969–70	Mississippi College
10	Sam Bowie	35	1995–96	Southern
	C.A. Core	35	1964–65	Louisiana College
	C.A. Core	35	1964–65	McNeese State
	Hank Washington	35	1992–93	Georgia State

== Rebounds ==
Career
Rk	Player	Rebounds	Seasons
1	C.A. Core	1,475	1964–65 1965–66 1966–67 1967–68
2	Freddie Lucas	820	1971–72 1972–73 1973–74 1974–75
3	Jerry Kelly	792	1979–80 1980–81 1981–82 1982–83
4	Patrick Sullivan	790	2006–07 2007–08 2008–09 2009–10
5	Moses Greenwood	765	2015–16 2016–17 2017–18 2018–19
6	Curlee Connors	729	1969–70 1970–71
7	Gary Childers	666	1962–63 1963–64 1964–65 1965–66
8	Thelander Tillman	653	1981–82 1982–83 1983–84 1984–85
9	Roger McFarlane	648	2021–22 2022–23 2023–24
10	Jimmy Cress	643	1958–59 1959–60 1960–61 1961–62 1962–63

Season
Rk	Player	Rebounds	Season
1	C.A. Core	439	1967–68
2	C.A. Core	396	1965–66
3	Curlee Connors	393	1969–70
4	C.A. Core	344	1966–67
5	Curlee Connors	336	1970–71
6	Nate Lofton	315	2003–04
7	Pete Meriweather	308	1991–92
8	Ricky Woods	304	2005–06
9	Charlie Jones	299	1972–73
10	C.A. Core	296	1964–65

Single game
Rk	Player	Rebounds	Season	Opponent
1	C.A. Core	31	1967–68	Mississippi College
	Charlie Doskey	31	1959–60	McMurray College
3	C.A. Core	28	1965–66	McNeese State
4	C.A. Core	26	1965–66	Nicholls State
	Curlee Connors	26	1969–70	Northwestern State
6	Ron Klosterman	24	1958–59	Southwestern (Tenn.)
	Jimmy Cress	24	1961–62	Spring Hill
	C.A. Core	24	1964–65	Southern Mississippi
	C.A. Core	24	1965–66	Univ. of Mexico
	C.A. Core	24	1966–67	Austin College
	C.A. Core	24	1967–68	William Carey

== Assists ==
Career
Rk	Player	Assists	Seasons
1	Marlain Veal	595	2015–16 2016–17 2017–18 2018–19
2	Leo McClure	433	1973–74 1974–75 1975–76 1976–77
3	Brandon Fortenberry	421	2008–09 2009–10 2010–11 2011–12 2012–13
4	DeShawn Patterson	381	2008–09 2009–10 2010–11 2011–12
5	Roscoe Eastmond	371	2021–22 2022–23 2023–24
6	Troy Green	357	1995–96 1996–97 1997–98 1998–99
7	Joe Venable	340	1983–84 1984–85 1985–86 1986–87
8	Terry Bryant	334	2003–04 2004–05 2005–06 2006–07
9	Von Julien	283	2018–19 2019–20
10	Zay Jackson	273	2014–15 2015–16

Season
Rk	Player	Assists	Season
1	Roscoe Eastmond	209	2023–24
2	Marlain Veal	207	2017–18
3	Leo McClure	188	1976–77
4	Zay Jackson	158	2015–16
5	Keith Gordon	157	1984–85
6	Rico Grant	151	1995–96
7	Marlain Veal	147	2018–19
	Von Julien	147	2019–20
9	Marlain Veal	144	2016–17
	Terry Bryant	144	2006–07

Single game
Rk	Player	Assists	Season	Opponent
1	Kevin Fogg	16	1974–75	Pikeville College
2	Leo McClure	15	1976–77	Tennessee-Martin
	Roscoe Eastmond	15	2023–24	Houston Christian
4	Kevin Fogg	14	1974–75	Southern
5	Roscoe Eastmond	13	2023–24	Loyola New Orleans
	Roscoe Eastmond	13	2023–24	Incarnate Word
	Scott Roniger	13	2005–06	Spring Hill
	John Shirley	13	1972–73	Livingston
9	Marlain Veal	12	2017–18	Incarnate Word
	Roscoe Eastmond	12	2023–24	Houston Christian

== Steals ==
Career
Rk	Player	Steals	Seasons
1	Marlain Veal	220	2015–16 2016–17 2017–18 2018–19
2	DeShawn Patterson	175	2008–09 2009–10 2010–11 2011–12
3	Hank Washington	169	1990–91 1991–92 1992–93
4	Nick Caldwell	127	2019–20 2020–21 2021–22 2022–23 2023–24
5	Amir Abdur-Rahim	120	2001–02 2002–03 2003–04
6	Troy Green	114	1995–96 1996–97 1997–98 1998–99
7	Ricky Woods	113	2004–05 2005–06
8	Brandon Fortenberry	110	2008–09 2009–10 2010–11 2011–12 2012–13
9	Thelander Tillman	109	1981–82 1982–83 1983–84 1984–85
10	Joe Venable	108	1983–84 1984–85 1985–86 1986–87

Season
Rk	Player	Steals	Season
1	Hank Washington	79	1992–93
2	Marlain Veal	66	2017–18
3	Bernard Sylve	60	1990–91
	Nate Lofton	60	2004–05
5	Jakevion Buckley	59	2024–25
6	Marlain Veal	58	2016–17
	Marlain Veal	58	2018–19
	Tavaris Nance	58	2007–08
9	Ricky Woods	57	2005–06
10	Ricky Woods	56	2004–05

Single game
Rk	Player	Steals	Season	Opponent
1	Ricky Woods	10	2005–06	Lamar
2	Hank Washington	9	1992–93	Texas-Pan American
3	Zay Jackson	7	2015–16	Florida A&M
	Amir Abdur-Rahim	7	2003–04	Northwestern State
	Thelander Tillman	7	1982–83	Nicholls State
	Bernard Sylve	7	1990–91	Northwestern State
7	Nick Caldwell	6	2022–23	Lamar
	Joe Kasperzyk	6	2021–22	Ecclesia College
	Marlain Veal	6	2016–17	New Orleans
	Nate Lofton	6	2004–05	Texas State
	Marcus Smith	6	2002–03	Texas State
	Lee Carney	6	2000–01	Sam Houston State
	Bobo McNair	6	1982–83	Texas-San Antonio
	Willie Samuel	6	1984–85	Northwestern State
	Hank Washington	6	1991–92	Louisiana Tech
	Greg Winnier	6	1993–94	LSU-Shreveport
	Reggie Jackson	6	1994–95	LSU
	Greg Winnier	6	1994–95	Loyola

== Blocks ==
Career
Rk	Player	Blocks	Seasons
1	Patrick Sullivan	273	2006–07 2007–08 2008–09 2009–10
2	Thelander Tillman	131	1981–82 1982–83 1983–84 1984–85
3	Moses Greenwood	104	2015–16 2016–17 2017–18 2018–19
4	Nate Lofton	99	2003–04 2004–05
	DeVonte Upson	99	2013–14 2014–15
6	Nick Caldwell	98	2019–20 2020–21 2021–22 2022–23 2023–24
7	David Ndoumba	95	2007–08 2008–09 2009–10 2010–11
8	Marvin Pierre	89	1990–91 1991–92
9	Jonathan Walker	88	2002–03 2003–04 2004–05 2005–06
10	Onochie Ochie	84	2011–12 2012–13 2013–14 2014–15

Season
Rk	Player	Blocks	Season
1	Patrick Sullivan	102	2009–10
2	Jalyn Hinton	81	2021–22
3	Patrick Sullivan	64	2008–09
4	Dominic Nelson	62	2016–17
	Thelander Tillman	62	1982–83
6	Patrick Sullivan	60	2007–08
7	Marvin Pierre	54	1991–92
8	Nate Lofton	52	2004–05
9	David Ndoumba	51	2010–11
	Patrick Sullivan	51	2006–07
	Bill Dukes	51	1984–85

Single game
Rk	Player	Blocks	Season	Opponent
1	Bill Dukes	11	1984–85	McNeese State
2	Dominic Nelson	9	2016–17	Toledo
3	Patrick Sullivan	8	2009–10	Texas State
	Thelander Tillman	8	1982–83	Arkansas-Little Rock
5	Jalyn Hinton	7	2021–22	New Orleans
	DeVonte Upson	7	2014–15	New Orleans
	David Ndoumba	7	2010–11	Southern
	Nate Lofton	7	2003–04	Northwestern State
	Bill Dukes	7	1985–86	Florida A&M
10	Jalyn Hinton	6	2021–22	Texas A&M CC
	Jalyn Hinton	6	2021–22	Nicholls
	DeVonte Upson	6	2014–15	Oklahoma
	Patrick Sullivan	6	2009–10	Sam Houston State
	Patrick Sullivan	6	2009–10	Central Arkansas
	Patrick Sullivan	6	2009–10	Nicholls State
	Patrick Sullivan	6	2009–10	Texas Southern
	Patrick Sullivan	6	2008–09	Arkansas
	Jonathan Walker	6	2005–06	Texas State
	Ricky Woods	6	2005–06	Spring Hill
	Nate Lofton	6	2003–04	Southern
