= Southland Conference men's basketball tournament =

American basketball tournament

- Conference basketball championship
- Sport: College basketball
- Conference: Southland Conference
- Number of teams: 8
- Format: Single-elimination tournament
- Current stadium: Townsley Law Arena
- Current location: Lake Charles, Louisiana
- Played: 1981–present
- Last contest: 2025
- Current champion: McNeese
- Most championships: Northeast Louisiana (6)
- TV partner: ESPN
- Official website: Southland.org Men's Basketball

Sponsors
- Jersey Mike's Subs

The Southland Conference's men's basketball tournament began in 1981, with the winner of the tournament receiving the conference's automatic bid into the NCAA Division I Men's Basketball Championship.

From 1981 to 2001, the first round of the tournament took place at the higher seed, with the remaining rounds at a set location. In 2002, the Southland changed the format to play games at the campus of sites of each higher seed, during every round of the tournament. This was changed again in 2007, the first year that the conference selected a neutral site for all rounds of the tournament.

Starting with the 2023 edition, the event is held at The Legacy Center on the campus of McNeese State University in Lake Charles, Louisiana, reportedly as part of a deal that kept McNeese in the Southland after it had been courted by Conference USA and nearly joined the Western Athletic Conference. This move followed a 15-season run (2008–2022) at Leonard E. Merrell Center in the Houston suburb of Katy, Texas.

== Tournament results ==
Year	Champion	Score	Runner-up	Tournament MVP	Location
1981	Lamar	83–69	Louisiana Tech	Mike Olliver, Lamar	first round at campus sites; rest at Beaumont Civic Center, Beaumont, Texas
1982	Southwestern Louisiana	81–75	Texas–Arlington	Alford Turner, Southwestern Louisiana	Blackham Coliseum, Lafayette, Louisiana
1983	Lamar	75–54	North Texas State	Kenneth Lyons, North Texas & Lamont Robinson, Lamar	Beaumont Civic Center
1984	Louisiana Tech	68–65	Lamar	Willie Simmons, Louisiana Tech	first round at campus sites; rest at Beaumont Civic Center
1985	Louisiana Tech	70–69	Lamar	Jerry Everett, Lamar	first round at campus sites; rest at Thomas Assembly Center, Ruston, Louisiana
1986	Northeast Louisiana	59–57	McNeese State	Arthur Hayes, Northeast Louisiana	first round at campus sites; rest at Fant–Ewing Coliseum, Monroe, Louisiana
1987	Louisiana Tech	58–51	Arkansas State	Robert Godbolt, Louisiana Tech	first round at campus sites; rest at Thomas Assembly Center
1988	North Texas	87–70	Northeast Louisiana	Tony Worrell, North Texas	first round at campus sites; rest at UNT Coliseum, Denton, Texas
1989	McNeese State	85–68	North Texas	Michael Cutright, McNeese State	first round at campus sites; rest at UNT Coliseum, Denton, Texas
1990	Northeast Louisiana	84–68	North Texas	Anthony Jones, Northeast Louisiana	Fant–Ewing Coliseum
1991	Northeast Louisiana	87–60	Texas–Arlington	Anthony Jones, Northeast Louisiana	Fant–Ewing Coliseum
1992	Northeast Louisiana	81–77	Texas–San Antonio	Ryan Stuart, Louisiana-Monroe	Convocation Center, San Antonio, Texas
1993	Northeast Louisiana	80–66	Texas–San Antonio	Ryan Stuart, Northeast Louisiana	Fant–Ewing Coliseum
1994	Southwest Texas State	69–60	North Texas	Lynwood Wade, Southwest Texas State	Fant–Ewing Coliseum
1995	Nicholls State	98–87	Northeast Louisiana	Reggie Jackson, Nicholls State	first round at campus sites; rest at Hirsch Memorial Coliseum, Shreveport, Louisiana
1996	Northeast Louisiana	71–60	North Texas	Paul Marshall, Northeast Louisiana	Hirsch Memorial Coliseum
1997	Southwest Texas State	74–64	Northeast Louisiana	Dameon Sansom, Texas State	Hirsch Memorial Coliseum
1998	Nicholls State	84–81	Texas–Arlington	Donald Harris, Texas–Arlington	Hirsch Memorial Coliseum
1999	Texas–San Antonio	71–63	Southwest Texas State	Steve Meyer, Texas–San Antonio	Gold Dome, Shreveport, Louisiana
2000	Lamar	62–55	Northwestern State	Landon Rowe, Lamar	first round at campus sites; rest at Hirsch Memorial Coliseum
2001	Northwestern State	72–71	McNeese State	Michael Byars-Dawson, Northwestern State	first round at campus sites; rest at CenturyTel Center, Bossier City, Louisiana
2002	McNeese State	65–43	Louisiana-Monroe	Fred Gentry, McNeese State	all at campus sites; finals at Burton Coliseum, Lake Charles, Louisiana
2003	Sam Houston State	69–66 (OT)	Stephen F. Austin	Donald Cole, Sam Houston State	all at campus sites; finals at Bernard Johnson Coliseum, Huntsville, Texas
2004	Texas–San Antonio	74–70	Stephen F. Austin	LeRoy Hurd, Texas–San Antonio	all at campus sites; finals at Convocation Center
2005	Southeastern Louisiana	49–42	Northwestern State	Ricky Woods, Southeastern Louisiana	all at campus sites; finals at Prather Coliseum, Natchitoches, Louisiana
2006	Northwestern State	95–87	Sam Houston State	Clifton Lee, Northwestern State	all at campus sites; finals at Prather Coliseum, Natchitoches, Louisiana
2007	Texas A&M–Corpus Christi	81–78	Northwestern State	Chris Daniels, Texas A&M–Corpus Christi	Campbell Center, Houston, Texas
2008	Texas–Arlington	82–79	Northwestern State	Anthony Vereen, Texas–Arlington	Leonard E. Merrell Center, Katy, Texas
2009	Stephen F. Austin	68–57	UTSA	Matt Kingsley, Stephen F. Austin	Leonard E. Merrell Center, Katy, Texas
2010	Sam Houston State	64–48	Stephen F. Austin	Ashton Mitchell, Sam Houston State	Leonard E. Merrell Center, Katy, Texas
2011	UTSA	75–72	McNeese State	Devin Gibson, UTSA	Leonard E. Merrell Center, Katy, Texas
2012	Lamar	70–49	McNeese State	Mike James, Lamar	Leonard E. Merrell Center, Katy, Texas
2013	Northwestern State	68–66	Stephen F. Austin	Shamir Davis, Northwestern State	Leonard E. Merrell Center, Katy, Texas
2014	Stephen F. Austin*	68–49	Sam Houston State	Thomas Walkup, Stephen F. Austin	Leonard E. Merrell Center, Katy, Texas
2015	Stephen F. Austin*	83–70	Sam Houston State	Thomas Walkup, Stephen F. Austin	Leonard E. Merrell Center, Katy, Texas
2016	Stephen F. Austin*	82–60	Texas A&M–Corpus Christi	Thomas Walkup, Stephen F. Austin	Leonard E. Merrell Center, Katy, Texas
2017	New Orleans	68–65 (OT)	Texas A&M–Corpus Christi	Erik Thomas, New Orleans	Leonard E. Merrell Center, Katy, Texas
2018	Stephen F. Austin*	59–55	Southeastern Louisiana	T. J. Holyfield, Stephen F. Austin	Leonard E. Merrell Center, Katy, Texas
2019	Abilene Christian	77–60	New Orleans	Jaren Lewis, Abilene Christian	Leonard E. Merrell Center, Katy, Texas
2020	Canceled due to COVID-19				
2021	Abilene Christian	79–46	Nicholls	Kolton Kohl, Abilene Christian	Leonard E. Merrell Center, Katy, Texas
2022	Texas A&M–Corpus Christi	73–65	Southeastern Louisiana	Terrion Murdix, Texas A&M–Corpus Christi	Leonard E. Merrell Center, Katy, Texas
2023	Texas A&M–Corpus Christi	75–71	Northwestern State	Jalen Jackson, Texas A&M–Corpus Christi	The Legacy Center/Townsley Law Arena, Lake Charles, Louisiana
2024	McNeese	92–76	Nicholls	Shahada Wells, McNeese	The Legacy Center/Townsley Law Arena, Lake Charles, Louisiana
2025	McNeese	63–54	Lamar	Javohn Garcia, McNeese	The Legacy Center/Townsley Law Arena, Lake Charles, Louisiana
2026	McNeese	76–59	Stephen F. Austin	Javohn Garcia, McNeese	The Legacy Center/Townsley Law Arena, Lake Charles, Louisiana
2027					The Legacy Center/Townsley Law Arena, Lake Charles, Louisiana
2028					The Legacy Center/Townsley Law Arena, Lake Charles, Louisiana
2029					The Legacy Center/Townsley Law Arena, Lake Charles, Louisiana

Note: Northeast Louisiana and Southwestern Louisiana became Louisiana–Monroe and Louisiana–Lafayette, respectively, in 1999; the latter has since changed its athletic branding to solely Louisiana. Southwest Texas State became Texas State in 2003.

Note on asterisks: Stephen F. Austin kept academically ineligible players from 2013 to 2020.

== Performance by school ==
Schools indicated in italics with a pink background are no longer in the SLC, as of the current 2024–25 NCAA basketball season. In 2024–25, UTRGV is playing its first SLC season, and Stephen F. Austin returned to the SLC after a three-year absence.

School	Championships	Championship Years
Louisiana–Monroe	6	1986, 1990, 1991, 1992, 1993, 1996
McNeese	5	1989, 2002, 2024, 2025, 2026
Lamar	4	1981, 1983, 2000, 2012
Northwestern State	3	2001, 2006, 2013
Louisiana Tech	3	1984, 1985, 1987
UTSA	3	1999, 2004, 2011
Texas A&M-Corpus Christi	3	2007, 2022, 2023
Abilene Christian	2	2019, 2021
Nicholls	2	1995, 1998
Sam Houston State	2	2003, 2010
Texas State	2	1994, 1997
New Orleans	1	2017
North Texas	1	1988
Southeastern Louisiana	1	2005
Stephen F. Austin	1 (Note: Stephen F. Austin used academically ineligible players from 2013-2020.)	2009, 2014, 2015, 2016, 2018
Southwestern Louisiana	1	1982
UT Arlington	1	2008
East Texas A&M	0	
Houston Christian	0	
Incarnate Word	0	
UTRGV	0	
TOTAL	44	

== All-Time Tournament Standings ==
School	Record	Winning pct	Championships	Runners-up	Appearances
Current Members
Lamar	21–14	.600	4	2	18
Northwestern State	21–15	.583	3	4	18
Stephen F. Austin	23–17	.575	5	4	22
New Orleans	5-4	.556	1	0	5
Texas A&M-Corpus Christi	8–8	.500	1	2	9
McNeese	24-28	.461	2	3	29
Southeastern Louisiana	9-14	.391	1	1	15
Nicholls	9–15	.375	2	0	17
Houston Christian	3-7	.300	0	0	7
Incarnate Word	0-0	.000	0	0	0
Former Members
Abilene Christian	2–0	1.000	1	0	1
Southwestern Louisiana (now Louisiana)	4-1	.800	1	0	2
Louisiana Tech	9-4	.692	3	1	7
Louisiana–Monroe	21-16	.568	6	4	22
UTSA	17-15	.531	3	3	18
Sam Houston	20–20	.500	2	3	22
North Texas	11-11	.500	1	5	12
Arkansas State	4-6	.400	0	1	6
Texas State	10-15	.400	2	1	17
UT Arlington	13-25	.342	1	3	26
Oral Roberts	1-2	.333	0	0	2
Central Arkansas	1–3	.250	0	0	4

Italicized indicates former member as of the 2024–25 NCAA basketball season.

== NCAA Tournament Appearances ==
Year	Southland Team	Opponent	Result
1969	Trinity	Texas A&M	L 66–81
1972	Southwestern Louisiana	Marshall; Louisville; Texas	W 112–101 (Note: Vacated due to the University of Southwestern Louisiana basketball scandal); L 84–88; W 100–70 (Note: Regional third-place game)
1973	Southwestern Louisiana	Houston; Kansas State; South Carolina	W 102–89; L 63–66; L 85–90
1979	(10) Lamar	(7) Detroit (2) Michigan State	W 95–87; L 64–95
1980	(10) Lamar	(7) Weber State (2) Oregon State (6) Clemson	W 87–86; W 81–77; L 66–74
1981	(8) Lamar	(9) Missouri (1) LSU	W 71–67; L 78–100
1982	(8) Southwestern Louisiana	(9) Tennessee	L 57–61
1983	(11) Lamar	(6) Alabama (3) Villanova	W 73–50; L 58–60
1984	(10) Louisiana Tech	(7) Fresno State (2) Houston	W 66–56; L 69–77
1985	(5) Louisiana Tech	(12) Pittsburgh (4) Ohio State (1) Oklahoma	W 78–54; W 79–67; L 84–86^{OT}
1986	(13) Northeast Louisiana	(4) UNLV	L 51–74
1987	(14) Louisiana Tech	(3) DePaul	L 62–76
1988	(15) North Texas	(2) North Carolina	L 65–83
1989	(16) McNeese State	(1) Illinois	L 71–77
1990	(15) Northeast Louisiana	(2) Purdue	L 63–75
1991	(15) Northeast Louisiana	(2) Duke	L 73–102
1992	(15) Northeast Louisiana	(2) USC	L 54–84
1993	(13) Northeast Louisiana	(4) Iowa	L 69–82
1994	(15) Southwest Texas State	(2) UMass	L 60–78
1995	(13) Nicholls State	(4) Virginia	L 72–96
1996	(15) Northeast Louisiana	(2) Wake Forest	L 50–62
1997	(16) Southwest Texas State	(1) Minnesota	L 46–78
1998	(16) Nicholls State	(1) Arizona	L 60–99
1999	(16) Texas-San Antonio	(1) Connecticut	L 66–91
2000	(16) Lamar	(1) Duke	L 55–82
2001	(16) Northwestern State	(16) Winthrop (1) Illinois	W 71–67; L 54–96
2002	(14) McNeese State	(3) Mississippi State	L 58–70
2003	(15) Sam Houston State	(2) Florida	L 55–85
2004	(16) Texas-San Antonio	(1) Stanford	L 45–71
2005	(15) Southeastern Louisiana	(2) Oklahoma State	L 50–63
2006	(14) Northwestern State	(3) Iowa (6) West Virginia	W 64–63; L 54–67
2007	(15) Texas A&M-Corpus Christi	(2) Wisconsin	L 63–76
2008	(16) Texas-Arlington	(1) Memphis	L 63–87
2009	(14) Stephen F. Austin	(3) Syracuse	L 44–59
2010	(14) Sam Houston State	(3) Baylor	L 59–68
2011	(16) Texas-San Antonio	(16) Alabama State (1) Ohio State	W 70–61; L 46–75
2012	(16) Lamar	(16) Vermont	L 59–71
2013	(14) Northwestern State	(3) Florida	L 47–79
2014	(12) Stephen F. Austin	(5) VCU (4) UCLA	W 77–75^{OT} L 60–77
2015	(12) Stephen F. Austin	(5) Utah	L 50–57
2016	(14) Stephen F. Austin	(3) West Virginia (6) Notre Dame	W 70–56; L 75–76
2017	(16) New Orleans	(16) Mount St. Mary's	L 66–67
2018	(14) Stephen F. Austin	(3) Texas Tech	L 60–70
2019	(15) Abilene Christian	(2) Kentucky	L 44–79
2021	(14) Abilene Christian	(3) Texas (11) UCLA	W 53–52; L 47–67
2022	(16) Texas A&M-Corpus Christi	(16) Texas Southern	L 67–76
2023	(16) Texas A&M-Corpus Christi	(16) Southeast Missouri State (1) Alabama	W 75–71; L 75–96
2024	(12) McNeese	(5) Gonzaga	L 65–86
2025	(12) McNeese	(5) Clemson (4) Purdue	W 69–67; L 62–76
2026	(12) McNeese	(5) Vanderbilt	L 68–78

- 2020 NCAA tournament was canceled due to COVID-19.

== Television coverage ==
Year	Network	Play-by-play	Analyst
2024	ESPN2	David Saltzman	Ben Braun
2023	ESPN2	David Saltzman	Ben Braun
2022	ESPN2	David Saltzman	Ben Braun
2021	ESPN2	Matt Schick	Joe Kleine
2020	ESPN2	Lowell Galindo	Lance Blanks
2019	ESPN2	Lowell Galindo	Reid Gettys
2018	ESPN2	Lowell Galindo	Lance Blanks
2017	ESPN2	Lowell Galindo	Lance Blanks
2016	ESPN2	Bob Wischusen	Sean Harrington
2015	ESPN2	Mark Neely	Stephen Howard
2014	ESPN2	Carter Blackburn	Stephen Howard
2013	ESPN2	Carter Blackburn	Mark Adams
2012	ESPN2	Carter Blackburn	Dereck Whittenburg
2011	ESPN2	Carter Blackburn	Dereck Whittenburg
2010	ESPN2	Lou Canellis	Mike Kelley
2009	ESPN2	Dave Barnett	Mike Kelley
2008	ESPN2	Dave Barnett	Bucky Walters
2007	ESPN2	Eric Collins	Jimmy Dykes

== See also ==
- Southland Conference women's basketball tournament
