= Mike Miller (basketball, born 1964) =

American basketball coach (born 1964)

Sacramento Kings
- Position: Assistant coach
- League: NBA

Personal information
- Born: August 14, 1964 (age 62) Monmouth, Illinois, U.S.

Career information
- High school: Monmouth (Monmouth, Illinois)
- College: Southeastern CC (1982–1983); East Texas A&M (1983–1986)
- Coaching career: 1989–present

Career history

Coaching
- 1989–1990: Western Illinois (assistant)
- 1990–1991: Sam Houston State (assistant)
- 1991–1994: Southwest Texas State (assistant)
- 1994–2000: Southwest Texas State
- 2000–2005: Kansas State (assistant)
- 2005–2012: Eastern Illinois
- 2012–2013: UC Riverside (assistant)
- 2013–2015: Austin Toros/Spurs (assistant)
- 2015–2019: Westchester Knicks
- 2019: New York Knicks (assistant)
- 2019–2020: New York Knicks (interim HC)
- 2020–2021: Oklahoma City Thunder (assistant)
- 2021–2024: Washington Wizards (assistant)
- 2025—present: Sacramento Kings (assistant)

Career highlights
- NBA G League Coach of the Year (2018); Southland tournament champion (1997); 2× Southland regular season champion (1997, 1999); Southland Coach of the Year (1997)

Michael E. Miller (born August 14, 1964) is an American basketball coach who is an assistant coach of the Sacramento Kings of the National Basketball Association (NBA).

== Early life ==
Miller was born on August 14, 1964, in Monmouth, Illinois, and graduated from Monmouth High School where he was a standout basketball player where the Monmouth "Zippers" finished second in the 1982 state championship game. He played college basketball at Burlington Junior College (now Southeastern Community College) in Burlington, Iowa and East Texas State University (now Texas A&M University–Commerce). At East Texas State, he was a member of the team that won the Lone Star Conference championship in 1984. He graduated from East Texas State in 1987.

== Coaching career ==
=== Early coaching career (1987–1994) ===
Miller began his coaching career as an assistant coach Cistercian Prep School in Irving, Texas in 1987. He was an assistant football and baseball coach, and the head coach of the JV basketball team his first year. The next year, he was head coach of the varsity basketball team, and left the following year to join the college ranks as an assistant at Western Illinois University, where he coached from 1989 to 1990. The following season, Miller was an assistant coach at Sam Houston State.

From 1991 to 1994, Miller was an assistant coach at Southwest Texas State (now Texas State) under Jim Wooldridge, where he helped Southwest Texas State achieve an NCAA tournament appearance and school record 25 wins in the 1993–94 season.

=== Southwest Texas State (1994–2000) ===
At age 29, Miller was promoted as head coach at Southwest Texas State in 1994 and was the second youngest NCAA Division I head coach that year. As head coach, Miller led Southwest Texas State to the Southland Conference regular season and conference tournament titles and an NCAA tournament appearance in 1996–97, for which he won Coach of the Year honors from the Southland. Southwest Texas State finished second in the Southland standings in 1997–98 and won another regular season title in 1998–99. Miller also coached center/power forward Jeff Foster, who would be a 1999 NBA first-round draft selection and play his entire 13-season career with the Indiana Pacers. In six seasons as head coach at Southwest Texas State, Miller had an 87–79 record.

=== Later college coaching career (2000–2013) ===
In 2000, Miller reunited with Wooldridge, this time as associate head coach at Kansas State, where he would remain for five seasons.

Miller had his second head coaching job at Eastern Illinois from 2005 to 2012, during which he went 75–130. His only winning season there was in 2009–10 when Eastern Illinois went 19–12. Following a 12–17 season, Eastern Illinois decided on February 27, 2012, not to renew Miller's contract that was to expire April 30.

In 2012–13, Miller was an assistant at UC Riverside, for his third assistant coaching job under Wooldridge.

=== Professional coaching career (2013–present) ===
In October 2013, Miller was named an assistant coach at the Austin Toros of the NBA D-League (now G League).

On October 7, 2015, the D-League's Westchester Knicks hired him to be their head coach. While with the Knicks, Miller won the NBA G League Coach of the Year for the 2017–18 season. After four seasons in Westchester, during which he went 108–92, Miller was promoted to the New York Knicks as an assistant coach.

Miller was named the Knicks' interim head coach on December 6, 2019.

He joined the Oklahoma City Thunder as an assistant coach for the 2020–21 season, later joining the Washington Wizards in the same role the following season.

On May 30, 2025, Miller was hired by the Sacramento Kings as part of Doug Christie's coaching staff.

== Head coaching record ==
=== College ===
Record table
Season	Team	Overall	Conference	Standing	Postseason
Southwest Texas State Bobcats (Southland Conference) (1994–2000)
1994–95	Southwest Texas State	12–14	7–11	T–7th	
1995–96	Southwest Texas State	11–15	7–11	T–7th	
1996–97	Southwest Texas State	16–13	10–6	T–1st	NCAA Division I First Round
1997–98	Southwest Texas State	17–11	10–6	T–2nd	
1998–99	Southwest Texas State	19–9	13–5	1st	
1999–2000	Southwest Texas State	12–17	8–10	T–6th	
Southwest Texas State:		87–79 (.524)	55–49 (.529)		
Eastern Illinois Panthers (Ohio Valley Conference) (2005–2012)
2005–06	Eastern Illinois	6–21	5–15	9th	
2006–07	Eastern Illinois	10–20	6–14	5th	
2007–08	Eastern Illinois	7–22	6–14	9th	
2008–09	Eastern Illinois	12–18	8–10	7th	
2009–10	Eastern Illinois	19–12	11–7	T–3rd	
2010–11	Eastern Illinois	9–20	4–14	9th	
2011–12	Eastern Illinois	12–17	5–11	10th	
Eastern Illinois:		75–130 (.366)	45–85 (.346)		
Total:		162–209 (.437)			
National champion Postseason invitational champion Conference regular season champion Conference regular season and conference tournament champion Division regular season champion Division regular season and conference tournament champion Conference tournament champion

=== NBA D-League/G League ===
Legend
Regular season	G	Games coached	W	Games won	L	Games lost	W–L %	Win–loss %
Playoffs	PG	Playoff games	PW	Playoff wins	PL	Playoff losses	PW–L %	Playoff win–loss %

Team	Year	G	W	L	W–L%	Finish	PG	PW	PL	PW–L%	Result
Westchester	2015–16	50	28	22	.560	2nd in Atlantic	2	0	2	.000	Lost quarterfinals
Westchester	2016–17	50	19	31	.380	T–3rd in Atlantic	–	–	–	–	Missed playoffs
Westchester	2017–18	50	32	18	.640	1st in Atlantic	1	0	1	.000	Lost semifinals
Westchester	2018–19	50	29	21	.580	T–2nd in Atlantic	2	1	1	.500	Lost semifinals
Career		200	108	92	.540		5	1	4	.200	

=== NBA ===
Legend
Regular season	G	Games coached	W	Games won	L	Games lost	W–L %	Win–loss %
Playoffs	PG	Playoff games	PW	Playoff wins	PL	Playoff losses	PW–L %	Playoff win–loss %

Team	Year	G	W	L	W–L%	Finish	PG	PW	PL	PW–L%	Result
New York	2019–20	44	17	27	.386	5th in Atlantic	—	—	—	—	Missed playoffs
Career		44	17	27	.386		–	–	–	–	
