= Pat Foster =

American former college basketball coach

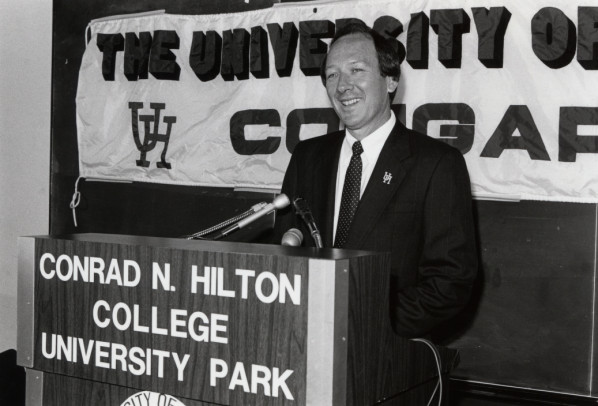

Biographical details
- Born: June 22, 1939 (age 87); Emerson, Arkansas, U.S.

Playing career
- 1958–1961: Arkansas

Coaching career (HC unless noted)
- 1962–1972: Camden Fairview HS (AR)
- 1972–1980: Arkansas (assistant)
- 1980–1986: Lamar
- 1986–1993: Houston
- 1993–1999: Nevada

Administrative career (AD unless noted)
- 1983–1985: Lamar

Head coaching record
- Overall: 366–203 (.643) (college); 215–95 (.694) (high school)
- Tournaments: 2–5 (NCAA Division I); 4–8 (NIT)

Accomplishments and honors

Championships
- 3 Southland regular season (1981, 1983, 1984); 2 Southland tournament (1981, 1983); SWC regular season (1992); SWC tournament (1992); Big West regular season (1997)

Awards
- Southland Coach of the Year (1984); SWC Coach of the Year (1992)

Pat Foster (born June 22, 1939) is an American former college basketball coach. He served as the head men's basketball coach at Lamar University (1980–1986), University of Houston (1986–1993), and the University of Nevada, Reno (1993–1999), compiling a career record of 366–203. Foster also served as athletic director at Lamar from 1983 to 1985. At Houston, he succeeded Guy Lewis. He then left Houston to coach Nevada before retiring.

== Head coaching record ==
Record table
Season	Team	Overall	Conference	Standing	Postseason
Lamar Cardinals (Southland Conference) (1980–1986)
1980–81	Lamar	25–5	8–2	1st	NCAA Division I second round
1981–82	Lamar	22–7	7–3	2nd	NIT first round
1982–83	Lamar	23–8	9–3	1st	NCAA Division I second round
1983–84	Lamar	26–5	11–1	1st	NIT second round
1984–85	Lamar	20–12	8–4	3rd	NIT second round
1985–86	Lamar	18–12	6–6	T–4th	NIT first round
Lamar:		134–49 (.732)	49–19 (.721)		
Houston Cougars (Southwest Conference) (1986–1993)
1986–87	Houston	18–12	9–7	T–3rd	NCAA Division I first round
1987–88	Houston	18–13	10–6	T–4th	NIT second round
1988–89	Houston	17–14	8–8	T–4th	
1989–90	Houston	25–8	13–3	2nd	NCAA Division I first round
1990–91	Houston	18–11	10–6	3rd	NIT first round
1991–92	Houston	25–6	11–3	T–1st	NCAA Division I first round
1992–93	Houston	21–9	9–5	3rd	NIT first round
Houston:		142–73 (.660)	70–38 (.648)		
Nevada Wolf Pack (Big West Conference) (1993–1999)
1993–94	Nevada	11–17	6–12	T–8th	
1994–95	Nevada	18–11	12–6	4th	
1995–96	Nevada	16–13	9–9	5th	
1996–97	Nevada	21–10	12–4	T–1st (East)	NIT second round
1997–98	Nevada	16–12	11–5	2nd	
1998–99	Nevada	8–18	4–12	5th	
Nevada:		90–81 (.526)	54–48 (.529)		
Total:		366–203 (.643)			
National champion Postseason invitational champion Conference regular season champion Conference regular season and conference tournament champion Division regular season champion Division regular season and conference tournament champion Conference tournament champion
