= List of Kansas State Wildcats men's basketball head coaches =

The following is a list of Kansas Wildcats men's basketball head coaches. The Wildcats have had 24 head coaches. A number of notable and successful coaches have led the Wildcats through the years. Following are all the coaches that have been at Kansas State.

Coach	Years at KSU	W	L	Win%	Conf. W	Conf. L	Conf. Win %	Awards and Achievements During Tenure
Charles W. Melick	1905–1906	7	9	.438	N/A	N/A	N/A	
Mike Ahearn	1906–1911	26	24	.520	N/A	N/A	N/A	
Guy Lowman	1911–1914	30	16	.652	0	10	.000	
Carl J. Merner	1914–1916	19	15	.559	13	13	.500	
Zora Clevenger	1916–1920	54	17	.761	38	16	.704	• 2 Conference Regular Season Championships (1917, 1919)
E. A. Knoth	1920–1921	14	6	.700	11	4	.733	
E. C. Curtiss	1921–1923	5	28	.152	5	27	.156	
Charles Corsaut	1923–1933	89	81	.524	61	63	.492	
Frank Root	1933–1939	38	72	.345	19	47	.287	
Jack Gardner^{†}^	1939–1942; 1946–1953	147	81	.645	66	46	.589	• 1 NCAA Championship Game (1951) • 2 Final Fours (1948, 1951) • 1 Sweet Sixteen (1951) • 2 Tournament Appearances (1948, 1951) • 3 Conference Regular Season Championships (1948, 1950, 1951) • 3 Conference Holiday Tournament Championships (1947, 1950, 1952) • 2 times ranked in top 6 of final AP and UPI polls (1951, 1952)
Chili Cochrane	1942–1943	6	14	.300	1	9	.100	
Cliff Rock	1943–1944	7	15	.318	1	9	.100	
Fritz Knorr	1944–1946	14	33	.298	6	14	.300	
Tex Winter^{†}^	1953–1968	261	118	.689	154	57	.730	• 2 Final Fours (1958, 1964) • 4 Elite Eights (1958, 1959, 1961,1964) • 6 Sweet Sixteens (1956, 1958, 1959, 1961, 1964, 1968) • 6 Tournament Appearances (1956, 1958, 1959, 1961, 1964, 1968) • 8 Conference Regular Season Championships (1956, 1958–1961, 1963, 1964, 1968) • 4 Conference Holiday Tournament Championships (1958, 1960, 1961, 1963) • Ranked No. 1 in final AP and UPI polls (1959) • 4 times ranked in top 6 of final AP and UPI polls (1958, 1959, 1961, 1962) • UPI National Coach of the Year (1958) • Big 7 Coach of the Year (1958) • 2-time Big 8 Coach of the Year (1959, 1960) • Undefeated conference season (14–0) (1959) • Developed the Triangle offense
Cotton Fitzsimmons	1968–1970	34	20	.630	19	9	.679	• 1 Sweet Sixteen (1970) • 1 Tournament Appearances (1970) • 1 Conference Regular Season Championship (1970) • Big 8 Coach of the Year (1970) • NABC District Coach of the Year (1970)
Jack Hartman	1970–1986	295	169	.636	133	91	.594	• 4 Elite Eights (1972, 1973, 1975, 1981) • 6 Sweet Sixteens (1972, 1973, 1975, 1977, 1981, 1982) • 7 Tournament Appearances (1972, 1973, 1975, 1977, 1980–1982) • 3 Conference Regular Season Championships (1972, 1973, 1977) • 2 Conference Tournament Championships (1977, 1980) • NABC Coach of the Year (1980) • 2-time Big 8 Coach of the Year (1975, 1977) • NABC District Coach of the Year (1977) • Most wins in program history
Lon Kruger	1986–1990	81	46	.638	34	22	.607	• 1 Elite Eight (1988) • 1 Sweet Sixteen (1988) • 4 Tournament Appearances (1987–1990) • NABC District Coach of the Year (1988) • Only KSU coach to take squads to NCAA Tournament in four consecutive seasons
Dana Altman	1990–1994	68	54	.557	19	37	.339	• 1 Tournament Appearance (1993) • Big 8 Coach of the Year (1993)
Tom Asbury	1994–2000	85	88	.491	29	63	.315	• 1 Tournament Appearance (1996)
Jim Wooldridge	2000–2006	83	90	.480	32	64	.333	
Bob Huggins	2006–2007	23	12	.657	10	6	.625	
Frank Martin	2007–2012	117	54	.684	50	32	.610	• 1 Elite Eight (2010) • 1 Sweet Sixteen (2010) • 4 Tournament Appearances (2008, 2010–2012) • Big 12 Coach of the Year (AP and coaches) (2010) • Highest NCAA seed (2) in program history (2010) • Most wins (29) in one season in program history (2010) • CollegeInsider.com Big 12 Coach of the Year (2008) • Jim Phelan Award as mid-season National Coach of the Year (2009–10) • USBWA District VI Coach of the Year (2010) • NABC District 8 Coach of the Year (2010) • Only KSU coach to win 20 or more games in first 5 seasons
Bruce Weber	2012–2022	143	85	.627	63	55	.534	• 1 Elite Eight (2018) • 1 Sweet Sixteen (2018) • 5 NCAA Tournament Appearances (2013, 2014, 2017-2019) • 2 Conference regular season Championships (2013, 2019) • Big 12 Coach of the Year (AP and coaches) (2013) • USBWA District VI Coach of the Year (2013) • Most wins (27) by a first-year coach in program history (2013) • Most wins (47) in the first 2 years. • Most conference wins (14) by a first-year coach in program history (2013) • Most conference wins (24) in the first 2 years. • Most conference wins (32) in the first 3 years. • Most all-time Top 25 victories (27) • Only KSU coach to win 25 or more games in back to back seasons
Jerome Tang	2022–2026	71	57	.555	29	39	.426	• Best start in program history by a first year coach • Naismith College Coach of the Year (2023) • Big 12 Coach of the Year (2023) • AP Big 12 Coach of the Year (2023) • USBWA District VI Coach of the Year (2023) • NABC District 8 Coach of the Year (2023)

†Inducted into the Naismith Memorial Basketball Hall of Fame
^Inducted into the National Collegiate Basketball Hall of Fame
