= Andy Russo =

Biographical details
- Born: May 26, 1948 (age 78)

Playing career
- 1966–1970: Lake Forest

Coaching career (HC unless noted)
- 1976–1979: Panola College
- 1979–1985: Louisiana Tech
- 1985–1989: Washington
- 1989–1991: Reyer Venezia
- 1991–1999: Florida Tech
- 1999–2003: Lynn

Head coaching record
- Overall: 376–253

Accomplishments and honors

Championships
- 2 Southland tournament (1984, 1985); Southland regular season (1985); European Cup (1990)

Awards
- 2× Southland Coach of the Year (1983, 1985); Sunshine State Coach of the Year (1994)

Andy Russo (born May 26, 1948) is a former college basketball coach at Louisiana Tech and at Washington. He compiled a 60–61 record through four seasons at Washington, and resigned at the end of the 1988-89 season after he led the Huskies to a pair of NCAA post season appearances and one NIT tournament during his tenure. Russo enjoyed greater success at Louisiana Tech. In 1983, Russo's Bulldogs team ended Lamar University's home game winning streak, thus earning the university's first NCAA men's bid to the "Big Dance." During the 1984 season, Louisiana Tech went 29–3, and had the best season in school history. His overall record at Louisiana Tech was 122–55.

As a collegiate player, Russo co-captained the Lake Forest College basketball team in 1970 with Mike Maiman.

== Head coaching record ==
Record table
Season	Team	Overall	Conference	Standing	Postseason
Panola College (NJCAA Region XIV Athletic Conference) (1976–1979)
1976–77	Panola College				
1977–78	Panola College				
1978–79	Panola College				Region XIV Champions; NJCAA National Tournaments
Panola College:		47–18			
Louisiana Tech Bulldogs (Southland Conference) (1979–1985)
1979–80	Louisiana Tech	17–10	10–5		
1980–81	Louisiana Tech	20–10	7–3		
1981–82	Louisiana Tech	11–16	2–8		
1982–83	Louisiana Tech	19–9	8–4		
1983–84	Louisiana Tech	26–7	8–4	3rd	NCAA Division I second round
1984–85	Louisiana Tech	29–3	11–1	1st	NCAA Division I Sweet 16
Louisiana Tech:		124–55	48–25		
Washington Huskies (Pac-10 Conference) (1985–1989)
1985–86	Washington	19–12	13–5	2nd	NCAA Division I first round
1986–87	Washington	20–15	10–8	3rd	NIT Quarterfinals
1987–88	Washington	10–19	5–13	T–8th	
1988–89	Washington	12–16	8–10	6th	
Washington:		61–62	36–36		
Florida Tech (Sunshine State Conference) (1991–1999)
1991–92	Florida Tech	15–13	6–6	4th	
1992–93	Florida Tech	10–16	3–9	6th	
1993–94	Florida Tech	15–12	7–7	4th	
1994–95	Florida Tech	17–10	10–4	T–2nd	
1995–96	Florida Tech	12–14	4–10	T–7th	
1996–97	Florida Tech	21–8	11–3	2nd	
1997–98	Florida Tech	19–10	7–5	T–2nd	
1998–99	Florida Tech	16–11	8–6	3rd	
Florida Tech:		125–94	56–50		
Lynn Fighting Knights (Sunshine State Conference) (1999–2003)
1999–2000	Lynn	19–8	8–6	3rd	
2000–01	Lynn	17–10	8–6	4th	
2001–02	Lynn	15–11	6–8	6th	
2002–03	Lynn	15–13	7–7	T–4th	
Lynn University:		66–42	29–27		
Total:		376–253			
National champion Postseason invitational champion Conference regular season champion Conference regular season and conference tournament champion Division regular season champion Division regular season and conference tournament champion Conference tournament champion
