= Billy Kennedy (basketball) =

American basketball coach (born 1964)

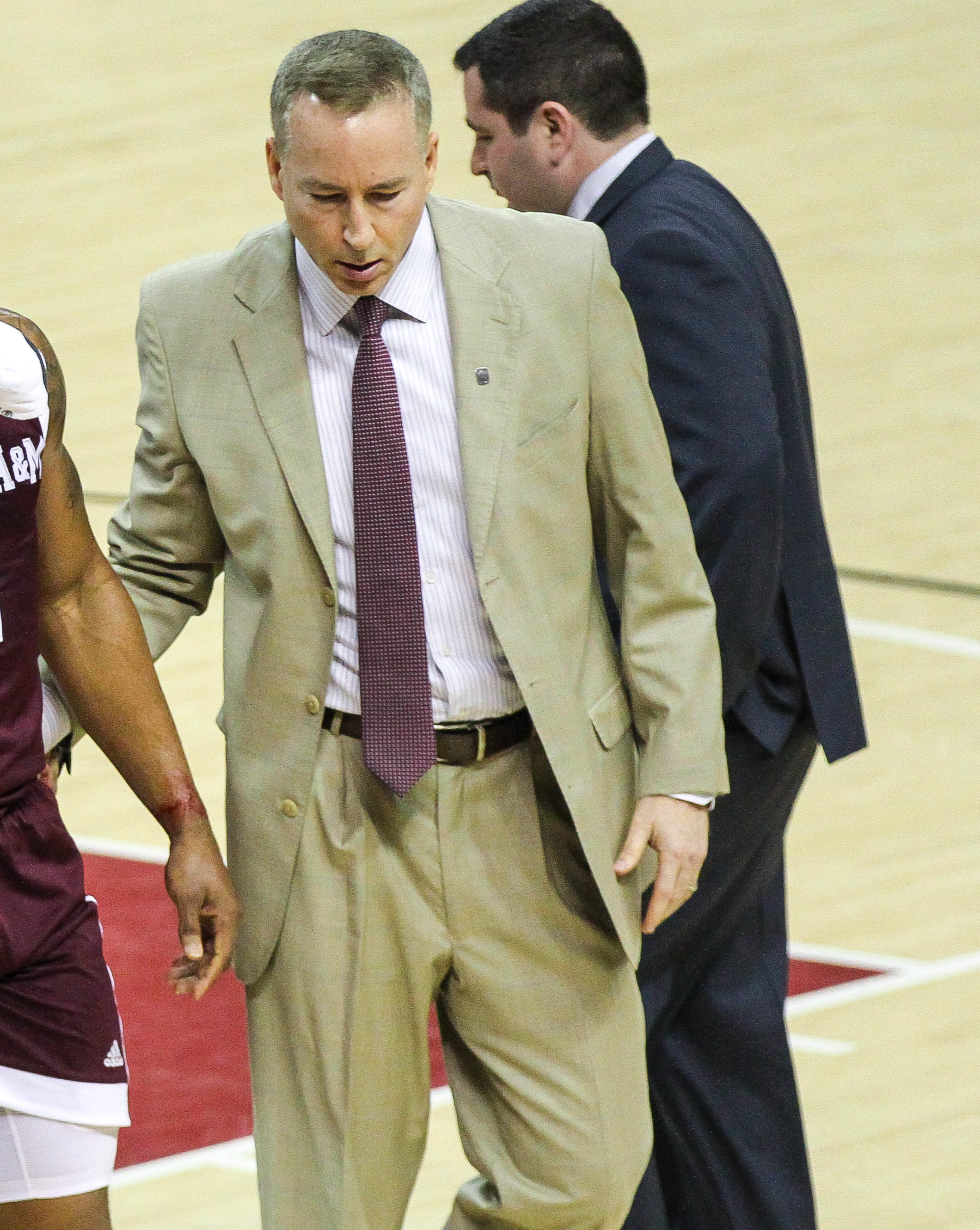

Biographical details
- Born: February 2, 1964 (age 62); Cape Canaveral Air Force Station, Florida, U.S.
- Education: Delgado CC; Southeastern Louisiana

Coaching career (HC unless noted)
- 1985–1986: Southeastern Louisiana (assistant)
- 1986–1987: New Orleans (assistant)
- 1987–1988: Wyoming (assistant)
- 1988–1989: Northwestern State (assistant)
- 1989–1990: Tulane (assistant)
- 1990–1991: Texas A&M (assistant)
- 1991–1993: Creighton (assistant)
- 1993–1997: California (assistant)
- 1997–1999: Centenary
- 1999–2005: Southeastern Louisiana
- 2005–2006: Miami (FL) (assistant)
- 2006–2011: Murray State
- 2011–2019: Texas A&M
- 2020–2023: Wichita State (assistant)

Head coaching record
- Overall: 356–289 (.552)
- Tournaments: 5–4 (NCAA Division I); 1–2 (NIT); 1–1 (CBI)

Accomplishments and honors

Championships
- Southland tournament (2005); 2 Southland regular season (2004, 2005); OVC tournament (2010); 2 OVC regular season (2010, 2011); SEC regular season (2016)

Awards
- Southland Coach of the Year (2004); 2× OVC Coach of the Year (2010, 2011); SEC Coach of the Year (2016)

William Joseph Kennedy Jr. (born February 2, 1964) is an American basketball coach who last served as an assistant coach for Wichita State University men's basketball team. Previously, Kennedy was the head coach of the Texas A&M University men's basketball team. He took over the position vacated by Mark Turgeon in May 2011. Prior to this, he held the same position at Murray State University for five seasons. Kennedy previously held the same position at Centenary and Southeastern Louisiana. He has served 13 seasons as a collegiate head coach and 13 as an assistant.

Kennedy is a 1986 graduate of Southeastern Louisiana and 1984 graduate of Delgado Community College in New Orleans. He played basketball and attended Holy Cross High School in New Orleans.

== Coaching career ==
=== Centenary ===
After serving 12 years as an assistant coach, including the previous four at California, Kennedy's first collegiate head coaching job came at Centenary. There, he took over a program that had won only 30 games in the previous three seasons. His first team won 10 games but his second improved to a 14-14 overall record and a 9-7 Trans America Athletic Conference mark, its best finish in five years.

=== Southeastern Louisiana ===
Southeastern Louisiana hired Kennedy in 1999 and he steadily improved his alma mater, winning 10 games in his first season and doubling that total four seasons later, winning the Southland Conference regular-season championship. His sixth team went 24-9, the most wins in school history, and won both the conference regular-season and tournament titles. The Lions advanced to the NCAA tournament for the first time in school history, where it lost to Oklahoma State 63-50.

The Louisiana Sports Writers Association, the Louisiana Association of Basketball Coaches, and the National Association of Basketball Coaches (District 8) selected Kennedy coach of the year in 2004 end 2005.

Kennedy resigned from his position at Southeastern Louisiana to become the associate head coach at Miami.

=== Murray State ===
After serving one season as an assistant at Miami, Kennedy was named Murray State's 14th men's basketball coach in 2006, taking over after Mick Cronin departed for Cincinnati.

Taking over a team with only one returning starter, he led the Racers to a 16-14 season and second-place finish in the Ohio Valley Conference. His next two squads won 18 and 19 games, again placing second in the conference regular-season standings, and advanced as far as the OVC tournament semifinals.

His fourth team at Murray State won more games than any in school history, reaching the second round of the NCAA tournament. The 13th-seeded Racers beat fourth-seed Vanderbilt University 66-65 in the first round in the West Regional at San Jose, California–only the third NCAA Tournament win in school history. They then lost a close second-round contest against fifth-seeded Butler University in the 54-52. During the season, the Racers won a school record 17 games in a row before losing 70-65 at Morehead State University on February 25, 2010. The Racers finished the season with a 31-5 record, including a 17-1 conference mark, and avenged their lone league loss with a 62-51 win over Morehead State in the OVC tournament championship game.

Kennedy was named 2010 OVC and National Association of Basketball Coaches (District 19) coach of the year.

In 2010-11, Kennedy's Racers repeated as OVC regular-season champions but fell in the conference tournament semifinals. As OVC regular-season champions, Murray State earned a berth in the National Invitation Tournament where it lost 89-76 at Missouri State to finish with a 23-9 season record. Kennedy was again selected OVC coach of the year.

=== Texas A&M ===
Texas A&M hired Kennedy in May 2011. Kennedy previously coached at A&M from 1990-91. Kennedy stated at the press conference that A&M is his destination job and he plans to retire there. He was given the honors of SEC Men's Basketball Coach of the Year in 2016.

On October 27, 2011, it was announced that Kennedy had been diagnosed with early-stage Parkinson's disease and would be leaving the team to undergo treatment. Kennedy said he planned to return following treatment and temporarily put Associate Coach Glynn Cyprien in charge of the team.

On November 13, 2011, in A&M's second game of the regular season, Kennedy returned to the bench for the Aggies' game against Southern.

Kennedy led A&M to its first conference title in 30 years when he shared the SEC crown with Kentucky in 2015-16. The Aggies also made the SEC tournament final before losing to Kentucky in overtime. For his efforts, Kennedy was given a new 5-year contract. Coach Kennedy's squad that year also orchestrated the largest final-minute come-from-behind victory in college basketball history by overcoming a 12 point deficit in the final 34 seconds of the Second Round of the 2016 NCAA tournament. A&M would tie up the game before finally defeating Northern Iowa in double overtime in order to advance to the Sweet 16 against the University of Oklahoma.

Kennedy led A&M to a number five ranking early in the 2017-2018 season and the team finished with 20 regular season wins. The team advanced to the second round of the NCAA tournament to play defending National champion North Carolina, ultimately beating North Carolina by 21 points to advance to the Sweet 16 and a game against Michigan.

After a disappointing 2018-19 season, losing four of five starters from the previous season also riddled with injuries and only seven scholarship players, he was fired at the conclusion of the season with two years remaining on his contract.

=== Wichita State ===
After Gregg Marshall's resignation from Wichita State, Kennedy was hired as an assistant for the 2020-21 season by the interim head coach Isaac Brown. While at Wichita State, Kennedy and his wife were recipients of the Coach Wooden "Keys to Life" Award in 2021.

== Head coaching record ==
Record table
Season	Team	Overall	Conference	Standing	Postseason
Centenary Gentlemen (Trans America Athletic Conference) (1997–1999)
1997–98	Centenary	10–20	8–8	3rd (West)	
1998–99	Centenary	14–14	9–7	5th	
Centenary:		24–34 (.414)	17–15 (.531)		
Southeastern Louisiana Lions (Southland Conference) (1999–2005)
1999–00	Southeastern Louisiana	10–17	5–13	T–9th	
2000–01	Southeastern Louisiana	8–21	5–15	11th	
2001–02	Southeastern Louisiana	7–20	6–14	10th	
2002–03	Southeastern Louisiana	11–16	9–11	8th	
2003–04	Southeastern Louisiana	20–9	11–5	T–1st	
2004–05	Southeastern Louisiana	24–9	13–3	T–1st	NCAA Division I Round of 64
Southeastern Louisiana:		80–92 (.465)	49–61 (.445)		
Murray State Racers (Ohio Valley Conference) (2006–2011)
2006–07	Murray State	16–14	13–7	T–2nd	
2007–08	Murray State	18–13	13–7	2nd	
2008–09	Murray State	19–12	13–5	T–2nd	
2009–10	Murray State	31–5	17–1	1st	NCAA Division I Round of 32
2010–11	Murray State	23–9	14–4	1st	NIT First Round
Murray State:		107–53 (.669)	70–24 (.745)		
Texas A&M Aggies (Big 12 Conference) (2011–2012)
2011–12	Texas A&M	14–18	4–14	9th	
Texas A&M Aggies (Southeastern Conference) (2012–2019)
2012–13	Texas A&M	18–15	7–11	11th	
2013–14	Texas A&M	18–16	8–10	9th	CBI Quarterfinals
2014–15	Texas A&M	21–12	11–7	T–3rd	NIT Second Round
2015–16	Texas A&M	28–9	13–5	T–1st	NCAA Division I Sweet 16
2016–17	Texas A&M	16–15	8–10	T–9th	
2017–18	Texas A&M	22–13	9–9	T–7th	NCAA Division I Sweet 16
2018–19	Texas A&M	14–18	6–12	11th	
Texas A&M:		151–116 (.566)	66–78 (.458)		
Total:		361–294 (.551)			
National champion Postseason invitational champion Conference regular season champion Conference regular season and conference tournament champion Division regular season champion Division regular season and conference tournament champion Conference tournament champion
