= 1997 Southland Conference men's basketball tournament =

Basketball Tournament March 1997 in Louisiana

- Classification: Division I
- Season: 1996–97
- Teams: 6
- Site: Hirsch Memorial Coliseum; Shreveport, Louisiana
- Champions: Southwest Texas State Bobcats (2nd title)
- Winning coach: Mike Miller (1st title)
- MVP: Dameon Sansom (Southwest Texas State)

1996–97 Southland Conference men's basketball standings
	Conf.				Overall
Team	W		L	PCT	W		L	PCT
McNeese State	10	–	6	.625	18	–	12	.600
Southwest Texas State †	10	–	6	.625	16	–	13	.552
Northeast Louisiana	10	–	6	.625	14	–	14	.500
Northwestern State	8	–	8	.500	13	–	15	.464
Stephen F. Austin	8	–	8	.500	12	–	15	.444
Texas-Arlington	8	–	8	.500	12	–	15	.444
Nicholls State	7	–	9	.438	10	–	16	.385
Sam Houston State	7	–	9	.438	8	–	18	.308
UTSA	4	–	12	.250	9	–	17	.346
† 1997 Southland tournament winner Rankings from AP Poll

The 1997 Southland Conference men's basketball tournament was held March 6–8 at Hirsch Memorial Coliseum in Shreveport, Louisiana.

Southwest Texas State defeated Louisiana-Monroe in the championship game, 74–64, to win their second Southland men's basketball tournament.

The Bobcats received a bid to the 1997 NCAA Tournament as the No. 16 seed in the Midwest region.

== Format ==
Six of the ten conference members participated in the tournament field. They were seeded based on regular season conference records, with the top two seeds receiving a bye to the semifinal round. Tournament play began with the quarterfinal round.

== Bracket ==
Quarterfinals; March 6
4	Northwestern State	85
5	Stephen F. Austin	64
3	McNeese State	81
6	Texas–Arlington	50

Semifinals; March 7
1	Northeast Louisiana	72
4	Northwestern State	54
3	McNeese State	59
2	Southwest Texas State	76

Championship; March 8
1	Louisiana–Monroe	64
2	Southwest Texas State	74
