= 1994 Southland Conference men's basketball tournament =

Basketball Tournament March 1994 in Louisiana

- Classification: Division I
- Season: 1993–94
- Teams: 8
- Site: Fant-Ewing Coliseum; Monroe, Louisiana
- Champions: Southwest Texas State (1st title)
- Winning coach: Jim Wooldridge (1st title)

1993–94 Southland Conference men's basketball standings
	Conf.				Overall
Team	W		L	PCT	W		L	PCT
NE Louisiana	15	–	3	.833	19	–	9	.679
SW Texas State †	14	–	4	.778	25	–	7	.781
Nicholls State	12	–	6	.667	19	–	9	.679
North Texas	9	–	9	.500	14	–	15	.483
McNeese State	9	–	9	.500	11	–	16	.407
UTSA	8	–	10	.444	12	–	15	.444
Sam Houston State	7	–	11	.389	7	–	20	.259
Northwestern State	6	–	12	.333	11	–	15	.423
Stephen F. Austin	6	–	12	.333	9	–	18	.333
Texas–Arlington	4	–	14	.222	7	–	22	.241
† 1994 Southland Conference tournament winner Rankings from AP Poll

The 1994 Southland Conference men's basketball tournament was held March 4–6 at Fant-Ewing Coliseum in Monroe, Louisiana.

Southwest Texas State defeated North Texas in the championship game, 69–60, to win their first Southland men's basketball tournament.

The Bobcats received a bid to the 1994 NCAA Tournament as the No. 15 seed in the Midwest region.

== Format ==
Eight of the ten conference members participated in the tournament field. They were seeded based on regular season conference records, with tournament play began with the quarterfinal round. Northwestern State and Texas-Arlington did not participate.

== Bracket ==
Quarterfinals; March 4
1	Northeast Louisiana	92
8	Stephen F. Austin	73
4	McNeese State	65
5	North Texas	69
3	Nicholls State	101
6	Texas-San Antonio	89
2	SW Texas State	65
7	Sam Houston State	56

Semifinals; March 5
1	Northeast Louisiana	74
5	North Texas	77
3	Nicholls State	65
2	SW Texas State	68

Championship; March 6
5	North Texas	60
2	SW Texas State	69
