= 1983 Southland Conference men's basketball tournament =

- Classification: Division I
- Season: 1982–83
- Teams: 7
- Site: Beaumont Civic Center; Beaumont, TX
- Champions: Lamar (2nd title)
- Winning coach: Pat Foster (2nd title)
- MVP: Kenneth Lyons, (North Texas); Lamont Robinson (Lamar)

1982–83 Southland Conference men's basketball standings
	Conf.				Overall
Team	W		L	PCT	W		L	PCT
Lamar †	9	–	3	.750	23	–	8	.742
Louisiana Tech	8	–	4	.667	19	–	9	.679
McNeese State	6	–	6	.500	16	–	13	.552
Northeast Louisiana	6	–	6	.500	14	–	14	.500
Arkansas State	5	–	7	.417	17	–	12	.586
North Texas State	5	–	7	.417	15	–	15	.500
Texas-Arlington	3	–	9	.250	9	–	19	.321
† 1983 Southland tournament winner Rankings from AP poll

The 1983 Southland Conference men's basketball tournament was held March 10–12 at the Beaumont Civic Center in Beaumont, Texas. This was the third edition of the tournament.

Lamar defeated North Texas in the championship game, 75–54, to win their second Southland men's basketball tournament.

The Cardinals received a bid to the 1983 NCAA Tournament. They were the only Southland member invited to the NCAA tournament.

== Format ==
All seven of the conference's members participated in the tournament field. They were seeded based on regular season conference records, with the top seed earning a bye into the semifinal round. The other six teams entered into the quarterfinal round.

All games were played at the Beaumont Civic Center in Beaumont, Texas, the home court of regular season champion Lamar.

== Bracket ==
Quarterfinals; Tuesday, March 10
5	Arkansas State	66
7	Texas-Arlington	56
3	Northeast Louisiana	74
4	McNeese State	79
2	Louisiana Tech	73
6	North Texas	87

Semifinals; Wednesday, March 11
1	Lamar	66
5	Arkansas State	46
4	McNeese State	60
6	North Texas	66

Championship; Thursday, March 12
1	Lamar	75
6	North Texas	54
