= 1984 Southland Conference men's basketball tournament =

- Classification: Division I
- Season: 1983–84
- Teams: 7
- First round site: Campus Sites; Campus Arenas
- Finals site: Beaumont Civic Center; Beaumont, Texas
- Champions: Louisiana Tech (1st title)
- Winning coach: Andy Russo (1st title)
- MVP: Willie Simmons (Louisiana Tech)

1983–84 Southland Conference men's basketball standings
	Conf.				Overall
Team	W		L	PCT	W		L	PCT
Lamar	11	–	1	.917	26	–	5	.839
Louisiana-Monroe	9	–	3	.750	17	–	12	.586
Louisiana Tech †	8	–	4	.667	26	–	7	.788
McNeese State	6	–	6	.500	16	–	15	.516
Arkansas State	4	–	8	.333	13	–	15	.464
North Texas	3	–	9	.250	9	–	19	.321
Texas-Arlington	1	–	11	.083	5	–	23	.179
† 1984 Southland tournament winner Rankings from AP poll

The 1984 Southland Conference men's basketball tournament was held March 8–10, 1984 with quarterfinal matchups being held at the home arena of the higher seed and the semifinals and championship game played at the Beaumont Civic Center in Beaumont, Texas.

Louisiana Tech defeated Lamar in the championship game, 68–65, to win their first Southland men's basketball tournament.

The Bulldogs received a bid to the 1984 NCAA Tournament as No. 10 seed in the Midwest region. They were the only Southland member invited to the NCAA tournament. Tournament runner-up and conference regular season champion Lamar received an invitation to the 1984 NIT Tournament.

== Format ==
All seven of the conference's members participated in the tournament field. They were seeded based on regular season conference records, with the top seed earning a bye into the semifinal round. The other six teams began play in the quarterfinal round.

First round games were played at the home court of the higher-seeded team. All remaining games were played at the Beaumont Civic Center in Ruston, Louisiana.

== Bracket ==
Quarterfinals; Tuesday, March 8
4	McNeese State	88
5	Arkansas State	72
3	Louisiana Tech	92
6	North Texas State	68
2	NE Louisiana	108
7	Texas-Arlington	86

Semifinals; Wednesday, March 9
1	Lamar	85
4	McNeese State	66
3	Louisiana Tech	69
2	NE Louisiana	56

Championship; Thursday, March 10
1	Lamar	65
3	Louisiana Tech	68
