= 1991–92 Northeast Louisiana Indians men's basketball team =

American college basketball season

1991–92 Northeast Louisiana Indians men's basketball

Southland tournament champions

NCAA tournament
- Conference: Southland Conference
- Record: 19–10 (12–6 Southland)
- Head coach: Mike Vining (11th season)
- Home arena: Fant–Ewing Coliseum

1991–92 Southland Conference men's basketball standings
	Conf.				Overall
Team	W		L	PCT	W		L	PCT
UTSA	15	–	3	.833	21	–	8	.724
NE Louisiana †	12	–	6	.667	19	–	10	.655
Nicholls State	12	–	6	.667	15	–	13	.536
North Texas State	12	–	6	.667	15	–	14	.517
UT Arlington	11	–	7	.611	16	–	13	.552
Stephen F. Austin	10	–	8	.556	15	–	13	.536
Northwestern State	9	–	9	.500	15	–	13	.536
Southwest Texas State	4	–	14	.222	7	–	20	.259
McNeese State	4	–	14	.222	7	–	22	.241
Sam Houston State	1	–	17	.056	2	–	25	.074
† 1992 Southland Conference tournament winner Rankings from AP Poll

The 1991–92 Northeast Louisiana Indians men's basketball team represented Northeast Louisiana University in the 1991–92 NCAA Division I men's basketball season. The Indians, led by head coach Mike Vining, played their home games at Fant–Ewing Coliseum in Monroe, Louisiana, as members of the Southland Conference. They finished the season 19–10, 12–6 in Southland play to finished in second place. They followed the regular season by winning the Southland tournament to earn an automatic bid to the NCAA tournament as No. 15 seed in the Midwest region. Northeast Louisiana fell to No. 2 seed USC in the opening round, 84–54.

== Roster ==
1991–92 Northeast Louisiana Indians men's basketball team
Players	Coaches
Pos. / # / Name / Height / Weight / Year / Hometown; F / 30 / Ryan Stuart / 6 ft 4 in (1.93 m) / — / Jr	Head coach: Mike Vining; Assistant coach(es) Legend: (C) Team captain; (S) Suspended; (I) Ineligible; (W) Walk-on; Injured; Current redshirt

== Schedule and results ==
Date time, TV	Rank^{#}	Opponent^{#}	Result	Record	Site (attendance) city, state
Regular season
Nov 22, 1991*		at No. 6 LSU	L 76–77	0–1	Maravich Assembly Center; Baton Rouge, Louisiana
Nov 30, 1991*		at Illinois	L 70–95	0–2	Assembly Hall; Champaign, Illinois
Dec 13, 1991*		vs. Oregon	W 61–59	1–2	
Dec 14, 1991*		vs. East Tennessee State	L 77–86	1–3	
Dec 30, 1991*		at Eastern Washington	W 81–77	2–3	Reese Court; Cheney, Washington
Southland tournament
Mar 7, 1992*		vs. North Texas; Semifinals	W 78–71	18–9	Convocation Center; San Antonio, Texas
Mar 8, 1992*		at UTSA; Championship Game	W 81–77	19–9	Convocation Center; San Antonio, Texas
NCAA Tournament
Mar 19, 1992*	(15 MW)	vs. (2 MW) No. 8 USC; First Round	L 54–84	19–10	Bradley Center; Milwaukee, Wisconsin
*Non-conference game. ^{#}Rankings from AP poll. (#) Tournament seedings in parentheses. MW=Midwest. All times are in Central.

== Awards and honors ==
- Ryan Stuart – Southland Player of the Year
