= 1983–84 Louisiana Tech Bulldogs basketball team =

American college basketball season

1983–84 Louisiana Tech Bulldogs basketball

Southland Conference tournament champions

NCAA tournament, Second round
- Conference: Southland Conference
- Record: 26–7 (8–4 Southland)
- Head coach: Andy Russo (5th season)
- Home arena: Thomas Assembly Center

1983–84 Southland Conference men's basketball standings
	Conf.				Overall
Team	W		L	PCT	W		L	PCT
Lamar	11	–	1	.917	26	–	5	.839
Northeast Louisiana	9	–	3	.750	17	–	12	.586
Louisiana Tech †	8	–	4	.667	26	–	7	.788
McNeese State	6	–	6	.500	16	–	15	.516
Arkansas State	4	–	8	.333	13	–	15	.464
North Texas	3	–	9	.250	9	–	19	.321
Texas-Arlington	1	–	11	.083	5	–	23	.179
† 1984 Southland tournament winner Rankings from AP poll

The 1983–84 Louisiana Tech Bulldogs basketball team represented Louisiana Tech University in Ruston, Louisiana for the 1983–84 season. Led by head coach Andy Russo, the Bulldogs played their home games at Thomas Assembly Center in Ruston, Louisiana. After finishing 3rd in the conference regular season standings, Louisiana Tech won the Southland Conference men's basketball tournament to earn a bid to the NCAA tournament. After an opening round win over Fresno State, the team was beaten by eventual National runner-up Houston, 77–69. Louisiana Tech finished the season with a 26–7 record (8–4 Southland).

== Roster ==
1983–84 Louisiana Tech Bulldogs men's basketball team
Players
Coaches

Pos.	#	Name	Height	Weight	Year	Hometown
F/C	32	Karl Malone	6 ft 9 in (2.06 m)	250 lb (113 kg)	So	Summerfield, Louisiana
F		Rennie Bailey	6 ft 4 in (1.93 m)	—	Sr
G		Wayne Smith	6 ft 4 in (1.93 m)	—	So
F		Willie Simmons	6 ft 10 in (2.08 m)	—	Jr
G		Alan Davis	6 ft 2 in (1.88 m)	—	Jr
F		Robert Godbolt	6 ft 6 in (1.98 m)	—	Fr
F		Ken Roberson	6 ft 6 in (1.98 m)	—	Sr
G		Tony Dawson	6 ft 1 in (1.85 m)	—	So
G		Adam Frank	6 ft 1 in (1.85 m)	—	Jr
F		Hiram Harris	6 ft 6 in (1.98 m)	—	So

Head coach

- Andy Russo

Assistant coach(es)

Legend

- (C) Team captain
- (S) Suspended
- (I) Ineligible
- (W) Walk-on
- Injured
- Current redshirt

== Schedule and results ==
Date time, TV	Rank^{#}	Opponent^{#}	Result	Record	Site city, state
Regular season
Nov 28, 1983*		at Western Kentucky	W 73–71 ^{2OT}	1–0	E.A. Diddle Arena (5,400); Bowling Green, Kentucky
Nov 30, 1983*		Northwestern State	W 79–55	2–0	Thomas Assembly Center (4,550); Ruston, Louisiana
Dec 3, 1983*		at Rice	W 77–69	3–0	Tudor Fieldhouse (500); Houston, Texas
Dec 5, 1983*		at Centenary	W 92–77	4–0	Gold Dome (3,322); Shreveport, Louisiana
Dec 8, 1983*		at Northwestern State	W 77–61	5–0	Prather Coliseum (700); Natchitoches, Louisiana
Dec 10, 1983*		Kent State	W 75–66	6–0	Thomas Assembly Center (3,880); Ruston, Louisiana
Dec 16, 1983*		vs. Western Carolina	W 72–48	7–0	Stokely Athletic Center (6,500); Knoxville, Tennessee
Dec 17, 1983*		at Tennessee	L 61–71	7–1	Stokely Athletic Center (6,500); Knoxville, Tennessee
Dec 19, 1983*		at No. 18 UTEP	L 70–82	7–2	Special Events Center (11,221); El Paso, Texas
Dec 22, 1983*		at Hawaii	W 76–63	8–2	Neal S. Blaisdell Center (3,372); Honolulu, Hawaii
Jan 7, 1984*		East Texas Baptist	W 90–46	9–2	Thomas Assembly Center (2,705); Ruston, Louisiana
Jan 9, 1984*		Pan American	W 56–52	10–2	Thomas Assembly Center (1,940); Ruston, Louisiana
Jan 11, 1984*		Southwestern Louisiana	W 63–62	11–2	Thomas Assembly Center (4,110); Ruston, Louisiana
Jan 14, 1984		Northeast Louisiana	W 79–63	12–2 (1–0)	Thomas Assembly Center (8,825); Ruston, Louisiana
Jan 19, 1984		at Arkansas State	L 52–53	12–3 (1–1)	Indian Fieldhouse (3,964); Jonesboro, Arkansas
Jan 21, 1984		Lamar	W 83–60	13–3 (2–1)	Thomas Assembly Center (4,415); Ruston, Louisiana
Jan 26, 1984		McNeese State	W 74–61	14–3 (3–1)	Thomas Assembly Center (3,440); Ruston, Louisiana
Jan 28, 1984*		at Southwestern Louisiana	W 77–73	15–3	Blackham Coliseum (9,127); Lafayette, Louisiana
Feb 2, 1984		at North Texas	W 75–68 ^{OT}	16–3 (4–1)	The Super Pit (2,100); Denton, Texas
Feb 4, 1984		Texas–Arlington	W 89–74	17–3 (5–1)	Thomas Assembly Center (2,850); Ruston, Louisiana
Feb 9, 1984		at Northeast Louisiana	L 79–82	17–4 (5–2)	Fant–Ewing Coliseum (4,955); Monroe, Louisiana
Feb 11, 1984		Arkansas State	W 87–71	18–4 (6–2)	Thomas Assembly Center (2,750); Ruston, Louisiana
Feb 16, 1984		at Lamar	L 60–85	18–5 (6–3)	Beaumont Civic Center (5,923); Beaumont, Texas
Feb 18, 1984		at McNeese State	L 79–97	18–6 (6–4)	Lake Charles Civic Center (4,000); Lake Charles, Louisiana
Feb 21, 1984*		Centenary	W 85–76 ^{OT}	19–6	Thomas Assembly Center (4,560); Ruston, Louisiana
Feb 25, 1984		North Texas	W 96–69	20–6 (7–4)	Thomas Assembly Center (1,750); Ruston, Louisiana
Mar 1, 1984		at Texas–Arlington	W 94–78	21–6 (8–4)	Texas Hall (700); Arlington, Texas
Mar 3, 1984		at Pan American	W 69–63	22–6	Pan Am Fieldhouse (3,055); Edinburg, Texas
Southland Conference tournament
Mar 8, 1984*		North Texas; Quarterfinals	W 92–68	23–6	Thomas Assembly Center (1,850); Ruston, Louisiana
Mar 9, 1984*		vs. Louisiana-Monroe; Semifinals	W 69–56	24–6	Beaumont Civic Center (5,538); Beaumont, Texas
Mar 10, 1984*		at Lamar; Championship game	W 68–65	25–6	Beaumont Civic Center (5,553); Beaumont, Texas
NCAA tournament
Mar 15, 1984*	(10 MW)	vs. (7 MW) Fresno State; First round	W 66–56	26–6	Mid-South Coliseum (11,200); Memphis, Tennessee
Mar 17, 1984*	(10 MW)	vs. (2 MW) No. 5 Houston; Second round	L 69–77	26–7	Mid-South Coliseum (11,200); Memphis, Tennessee
*Non-conference game. ^{#}Rankings from AP Poll. (#) Tournament seedings in parentheses. MW=Midwest.
