= 1992 Southland Conference men's basketball tournament =

Basketball Tournament March 1992 in Texas

- Classification: Division I
- Season: 1991–92
- Teams: 6
- Site: Convocation Center; San Antonio, Texas
- Champions: Northeast Louisiana (4th title)
- Winning coach: Mike Vining (4th title)
- MVP: Ryan Stuart (Northeast Louisiana)

1991–92 Southland Conference men's basketball standings
	Conf.				Overall
Team	W		L	PCT	W		L	PCT
UTSA	15	–	3	.833	21	–	8	.724
NE Louisiana †	12	–	6	.667	19	–	10	.655
Nicholls State	12	–	6	.667	15	–	13	.536
North Texas State	12	–	6	.667	15	–	14	.517
UT Arlington	11	–	7	.611	16	–	13	.552
Stephen F. Austin	10	–	8	.556	15	–	13	.536
Northwestern State	9	–	9	.500	15	–	13	.536
Texas State	4	–	14	.222	7	–	20	.259
McNeese State	4	–	14	.222	7	–	22	.241
Sam Houston State	1	–	17	.056	2	–	25	.074
† 1992 Southland Conference tournament winner Rankings from AP Poll

The 1992 Southland Conference men's basketball tournament was held March 6–8 at Convocation Center in San Antonio, Texas.

Northeast Louisiana defeated Texas–San Antonio in the championship game, 81–77, to win their third consecutive Southland men's basketball tournament.

The Indians received a bid to the 1992 NCAA Tournament as the No. 15 seed in the Midwest region.

== Format ==
Six of the ten conference members participated in the tournament field. They were seeded based on regular season conference records, with the top two seeds receiving a bye to the semifinal round. Tournament play began with the quarterfinal round.

== Bracket ==
Quarterfinals; March 6
4	Nicholls State	62
5	Texas–Arlington	77
3	North Texas State	91
6	Stephen F. Austin	71

Semifinals; March 7
1	Texas–San Antonio	94
5	Texas–Arlington	75
3	North Texas State	71
2	NE Louisiana	78

Championship; March 8
1	Texas-San Antonio	77
2	NE Louisiana	81
