= Jim Wooldridge =

American basketball player-coach

Biographical details
- Born: August 22, 1955 (age 71); Oklahoma City, Oklahoma, U.S.

Playing career
- 1974–1977: Louisiana Tech
- Position: Guard

Coaching career (HC unless noted)
- 1977–1978: Louisiana Tech (GA)
- 1978–1982: East Central (asst.)
- 1982–1985: Central Missouri State (asst.)
- 1985–1991: Central Missouri State
- 1991–1994: Southwest Texas State
- 1994–1998: Louisiana Tech
- 1998–2000: Chicago Bulls (asst.)
- 2000–2006: Kansas State
- 2007–2013: UC Riverside

Administrative career (AD unless noted)
- 2013–2015: UC Riverside
- 2015–2020: Riverside CC

Head coaching record
- Overall: 381–350 (.521)
- Tournaments: 0–1 (NCAA Division I); 3–3 (NCAA Division II)

Accomplishments and honors

Championships
- Southland tournament (1994)

Awards
- Southland Coach of the Year (1994)

James Allen Wooldridge (born August 22, 1955) is an American former college basketball coach and athletics administrator. Wooldridge was head coach at Central Missouri State, Texas State, Louisiana Tech, Kansas State, and UC Riverside. After his coaching career, Wooldridge served as athletic director at UC Riverside and Riverside City College.

== Early life and education ==
Born and raised in Oklahoma City, Oklahoma, Wooldridge played on Putnam City High School's class 4A state basketball championship team in 1972. Playing at guard for the Louisiana Tech Bulldogs under head coach Emmett Hendricks from 1974 to 1977, Wooldridge was part of the Louisiana Tech team that won the 1976 Southland Conference regular season title. He earned his bachelor's degree in physical education from Louisiana Tech University in 1977 and master's degree in education from East Central University in 1979.

== Coaching career ==
=== Early coaching career (1977–1985) ===
Wooldridge began his coaching career as a graduate assistant at Louisiana Tech in 1977–78 under new head coach J.D. Barnett. His first full time coaching job was at East Central, an NCAA Division II school where he was an assistant coach from 1978 to 1982. From 1982 to 1985, Wooldridge was an assistant coach at Central Missouri State (now Central Missouri) under Lynn Nance.

=== Central Missouri State (1985–1991) ===
In 1985, Wooldridge was promoted to head coach. In six seasons as head coach, Wooldridge went 130–49, with three consecutive NCAA tournament appearances from 1989 to 1991. The 1989–90 team went 27–6 for the second most wins in program history.

=== Southwest Texas State (1991–1994) ===
Wooldridge got his first NCAA Division I head coaching job at Southwest Texas State (now Texas State) in 1991. In three seasons, Texas State improved from 7–20 in 1991–92 to 25–7 with the Southland Conference men's basketball tournament title in 1993–94. As a result of winning the Southland Tournament, Southwest Texas State qualified for the NCAA tournament for the first time in program history. In three seasons, Wooldridge was 46–40 at Southwest Texas State.

=== Louisiana Tech head coach and NBA assistant (1994–2000) ===
In 1994, Wooldridge returned to his alma mater to be head coach at Louisiana Tech. After debuting with a 14–13 record, Wooldridge was less successful at Louisiana Tech than his previous two head coaching jobs. In four seasons, Wooldridge went 52–59. From 1998 to 2000, Wooldridge was an assistant coach for the Chicago Bulls of the NBA under former college teammate Tim Floyd.

=== Kansas State (2000–2006) ===
Wooldridge returned to college coaching in 2000 at Kansas State. In six seasons, Wooldridge went 83–90 at Kansas State. Although his last two teams had winning records, none of his teams had more than six wins in Big 12 Conference play or qualified for the NCAA Tournament or NIT. Kansas State fired Wooldridge on March 9, 2006; athletic director Tim Weiser said that an NCAA Tournament invitation was necessary for Wooldridge to keep his job.

Kansas State's 59–55 win at rival Kansas on January 14, 2006, was the only win in the Sunflower Showdown rivalry series during the Wooldridge era and Kansas State's most recent win at Allen Fieldhouse as of 2024.

=== UC Riverside (2007–2013) ===
From 2007 to 2013, Wooldridge was head coach at UC Riverside, where he went 70–112. In his second season, Wooldridge led UC Riverside to a 17–13 record in 2008–09, which would end up being his only winning season there. Wooldridge's college coaching career concluded in 2013 with a 381–350 record over 25 seasons at five programs.

== Administrative career ==
After stepping down as head coach of UC Riverside basketball, Wooldridge was named interim athletic director at UC Riverside in July 2013 and later named Director of Intercollegiate Athletics in January 2014. After two years in this role, Wooldridge resigned in October 2014. In July 2015, Wooldridge was named interim athletic director at Riverside City College. In the summer of 2016, Wooldridge was elevated to the job long term. On March 30, 2020, Wooldridge announced that he would retire in July.

== Head coaching record ==
Record table
Season	Team	Overall	Conference	Standing	Postseason
Central Missouri State Mules (Missouri Intercollegiate Athletic Association) (1985–1991)
1985–86	Central Missouri State	17–10	9–3	2nd	
1986–87	Central Missouri State	20–8	8–6	T–3rd	
1987–88	Central Missouri State	18–10	8–6	4th	
1988–89	Central Missouri State	22–9	8–6	4th	NCAA Division II Regional Final
1989–90	Central Missouri State	27–6	12–4	2nd (North)	NCAA Division II Regional Final
1990–91	Central Missouri State	27–5	13–3	T–2nd	NCAA Division II Regional Final
Central Missouri State:		131–48 (.732)	58–28 (.674)		
Southwest Texas State Bobcats (Southland Conference) (1991–1994)
1991–92	Southwest Texas State	7–20	4–14	T–8th	
1992–93	Southwest Texas State	14–13	9–9	T–5th	
1993–94	Southwest Texas State	25–7	14–4	2nd	NCAA Division I First Round
Southwest Texas State:		46–40 (.535)	27–27 (.500)		
Louisiana Tech Bulldogs (Sun Belt Conference) (1994–1998)
1994–95	Louisiana Tech	14–13	9–9	T–5th	
1995–96	Louisiana Tech	11–17	6–12	T–9th	
1996–97	Louisiana Tech	15–14	10–8	T–4th	
1997–98	Louisiana Tech	12–15	9–9	T–5th	
Louisiana Tech:		52–59 (.468)	34–38 (.472)		
Kansas State Wildcats (Big 12 Conference) (2000–2006)
2000–01	Kansas State	11–18	4–12	10th	
2001–02	Kansas State	13–16	6–10	T–7th	
2002–03	Kansas State	13–17	4–12	11th	
2003–04	Kansas State	14–14	6–10	T–9th	
2004–05	Kansas State	17–12	6–10	10th	
2005–06	Kansas State	15–13	6–10	T–7th	
Kansas State:		83–90 (.480)	32–64 (.333)		
UC Riverside Highlanders (Big West Conference) (2007–2013)
2007–08	UC Riverside	9–21	4–12	7th	
2008–09	UC Riverside	17–13	8–8	T–4th	
2009–10	UC Riverside	12–17	5–11	9th	
2010–11	UC Riverside	12–19	6–10	T–7th	
2011–12	UC Riverside	14–17	7–9	5th	
2012–13	UC Riverside	6–25	3–15	10th	
UC Riverside:		70–112 (.424)	30–58 (.386)		
Total:		381–350 (.521)			
National champion Postseason invitational champion Conference regular season champion Conference regular season and conference tournament champion Division regular season champion Division regular season and conference tournament champion Conference tournament champion
