= 1996–97 Southwest Texas State Bobcats men's basketball team =

American college basketball season

1996–97 Southwest Texas State Bobcats men's basketball

Southland regular season co-champions Southland tournament champions

NCAA tournament
- Conference: Southland Conference
- Record: 16–13 (10–6 Southland)
- Head coach: Mike Miller (3rd season)
- Home arena: Strahan Arena

1996–97 Southland Conference men's basketball standings
	Conf.				Overall
Team	W		L	PCT	W		L	PCT
McNeese State	10	–	6	.625	18	–	12	.600
Southwest Texas State †	10	–	6	.625	16	–	13	.552
Northeast Louisiana	10	–	6	.625	14	–	14	.500
Northwestern State	8	–	8	.500	13	–	15	.464
Stephen F. Austin	8	–	8	.500	12	–	15	.444
Texas-Arlington	8	–	8	.500	12	–	15	.444
Nicholls State	7	–	9	.438	10	–	16	.385
Sam Houston State	7	–	9	.438	8	–	18	.308
UTSA	4	–	12	.250	9	–	17	.346
† 1997 Southland tournament winner Rankings from AP Poll

The 1996–97 Southwest Texas State Bobcats men's basketball team represented Southwest Texas State University in the 1996–97 NCAA Division I men's basketball season. The Bobcats, led by head coach Mike Miller, played their home games at Strahan Arena in San Marcos, Texas as members of the Southland Conference.

The Bobcats finished atop the regular season conference standings, won the Southland tournament, and received an automatic bid to the NCAA tournament. As No. 16 seed in the Midwest region, Southwest Texas State was beaten by No. 1 seed and eventual Final Four participant Minnesota, 78–46.

== Roster ==
1996–97 Texas State Bobcats men's basketball team
Players
Coaches

Pos.	#	Name	Height	Weight	Year	Hometown
C	42	Jeff Foster	6 ft 11 in (2.11 m)	235 lb (107 kg)	RS So	San Antonio, Texas
F		Solomon Clark	6 ft 7 in (2.01 m)	—	Sr
G		Geoff Golden	5 ft 10 in (1.78 m)	—	Sr
F		Elijah Hobley	6 ft 6 in (1.98 m)	—	Sr
G		Kenyatta Isable	6 ft 4 in (1.93 m)	—	Jr
F		Ross Johnson	6 ft 6 in (1.98 m)	—	Jr
F		Dennis Malone	6 ft 7 in (2.01 m)	—	Jr
G		Donte Mathis	6 ft 4 in (1.93 m)	—	So	San Antonio, Texas
F		Jermal McCoy	6 ft 5 in (1.96 m)	—	Sr
F		Carlos Morris	6 ft 5 in (1.96 m)	—	Jr
G		Dameon Samson	6 ft 0 in (1.83 m)	—	Sr
G		Rodney Walton	5 ft 10 in (1.78 m)	—	Sr
G		Wesley Williams	6 ft 3 in (1.91 m)	—	Fr

Head coach

- Mike Miller (Texas A&M–Commerce)

Assistant coach(es)

Legend

- (C) Team captain
- (S) Suspended
- (I) Ineligible
- (W) Walk-on
- Injured
- Current redshirt

Roster

== Schedule and results ==
Date time, TV	Rank^{#}	Opponent^{#}	Result	Record	Site (attendance) city, state
Regular season
Nov 25, 1996*		Texas Southern	W 78–73	1–0	Strahan Coliseum; San Marcos, Texas
Nov 29, 1996*		vs. Troy	L 52–85	1–1	Worthen Arena; Muncie, Indiana
Nov 30, 1996*		vs. Coastal Carolina	W 74–58	2–1	Worthen Arena; Muncie, Indiana
Dec 2, 1996*		at Connecticut	L 49–66	2–2	Harry A. Gampel Pavilion (14,104); Storrs, Connecticut
Dec 7, 1996*		at Centenary	L 75–78	2–3	Gold Dome; Shreveport, Louisiana
Dec 10, 1996*		San Diego State	W 81–77 ^{OT}	3–3	Strahan Coliseum; San Marcos, Texas
Dec 14, 1996*		Hardin-Simmons	W 71–45	4–3	Strahan Coliseum; San Marcos, Texas
Dec 21, 1996*		at Lamar	L 67–73	4–4	Montagne Center; Beaumont, Texas
Dec 27, 1996*		vs. Tulsa; All-College Tournament	L 60–76	4–5	Myriad Convention Center; Oklahoma City, Oklahoma
Dec 28, 1996*		vs. Western Illinois; All-College Tournament	L 61–68	4–6	Myriad Convention Center; Oklahoma City, Oklahoma
Jan 2, 1997		McNeese State	W 80–64	5–6 (1–0)	Strahan Coliseum; San Marcos, Texas
Jan 4, 1997		Nicholls State	W 82–73	6–6 (2–0)	Strahan Coliseum; San Marcos, Texas
Jan 9, 1997		at Louisiana-Monroe	L 54–58	6–7 (2–1)	Fant–Ewing Coliseum; Monroe, Louisiana
Jan 11, 1997		at Northwestern State	W 65–58	7–7 (3–1)	Prather Coliseum; Natchitoches, Louisiana
Jan 15, 1997		at Texas-Arlington	L 63–66 ^{OT}	7–8 (3–2)	Texas Hall; Arlington, Texas
Jan 18, 1997		Sam Houston State	W 75–60	8–8 (4–2)	Strahan Coliseum; San Marcos, Texas
Jan 20, 1997		Stephen F. Austin	W 86–71	9–8 (5–2)	Strahan Coliseum; San Marcos, Texas
Jan 25, 1997		at UTSA	W 100–85	10–8 (6–2)	Convocation Center; San Antonio, Texas
Jan 30, 1997		Northwestern State	W 87–77	11–8 (7–2)	Strahan Coliseum; San Marcos, Texas
Feb 1, 1997		Louisiana-Monroe	W 72–62	12–8 (8–2)	Strahan Coliseum; San Marcos, Texas
Feb 6, 1997		at Nicholls State	L 73–76	12–9 (8–3)	Stopher Gymnasium; Thibodaux, Louisiana
Feb 8, 1997		at McNeese State	L 70–87	12–10 (8–4)	Burton Coliseum; Lake Charles, Louisiana
Feb 15, 1997		UTSA	W 86–78 ^{OT}	13–10 (9–4)	Strahan Coliseum; San Marcos, Texas
Feb 20, 1997		Texas-Arlington	W 64–63	14–10 (10–4)	Strahan Coliseum; San Marcos, Texas
Feb 27, 1997		at Stephen F. Austin	L 55–65	14–11 (10–5)	William R. Johnson Coliseum; Nacogdoches, Texas
Mar 1, 1997		at Sam Houston State	L 69–71	14–12 (10–6)	Bernard Johnson Coliseum; Huntsville, Texas
Southland tournament
Mar 7, 1997*	(2)	vs. (3) McNeese State; Semifinals	W 76–59	15–12	Hirsch Memorial Coliseum; Shreveport, Louisiana
Mar 8, 1997*	(2)	vs. (1) Louisiana-Monroe; Championship game	W 74–64	16–12	Hirsch Memorial Coliseum; Shreveport, Louisiana
NCAA tournament
Mar 14, 1997*	(16 MW)	vs. (1 MW) No. 3 Minnesota; First round	L 46–78	16–13	Kemper Arena; Kansas City, Missouri
*Non-conference game. ^{#}Rankings from AP Poll. (#) Tournament seedings in parentheses. All times are in Central.
