= 1983–84 Lamar Cardinals basketball team =

American college basketball season

1983–84 Lamar Cardinals men's basketball

Southland Conference regular season champions

1984 National Invitation Tournament, Second round
- Conference: Southland Conference
- Record: 26–5 (11–1 Southland)
- Head coach: Pat Foster (4th season)
- Home arena: Beaumont Civic Center (Capacity: 6,500)

1983–84 Southland Conference men's basketball standings
	Conf.				Overall
Team	W		L	PCT	W		L	PCT
Lamar	11	–	1	.917	26	–	5	.839
Northeast Louisiana	9	–	3	.750	17	–	12	.586
Louisiana Tech †	8	–	4	.667	26	–	7	.788
McNeese State	6	–	6	.500	16	–	15	.516
Arkansas State	4	–	8	.333	13	–	15	.464
North Texas	3	–	9	.250	9	–	19	.321
Texas-Arlington	1	–	11	.083	5	–	23	.179
† 1984 Southland tournament winner Rankings from AP poll

The 1983–84 Lamar Cardinals basketball team represented Lamar University during the 1983–84 NCAA Division I men's basketball season. The Cardinals were led by fourth-year head coach Pat Foster and played their home games at the Beaumont Civic Center in Beaumont, Texas as members of the Southland Conference. The Cardinals won the regular season conference championship. They fell to the Louisiana Tech in the 1984 SLC tournament. They received an invitation to the 1984 National Invitation Tournament where they defeated New Mexico in the first round and lost to Santa Clara in the second round. Lamar finished the season with a record of 26–5 (11–1 Southland).

== Roster ==
1983–84 Lamar Cardinals men's basketball team
Players
Coaches

Pos.	#	Name	Height	Weight	Year	Hometown
G		Tom Sewell	6 ft 5 in (1.96 m)	—	Sr	Pensacola, FL
G		Jerry Everett	6 ft 5 in (1.96 m)	185 lb (84 kg)	Jr
F		Kenneth Perkins	6 ft 6 in (1.98 m)	—	Jr	Beaumont, TX
G		Lamont Robinson	6 ft 3 in (1.91 m)	—	Sr
F		George Milhouse	6 ft 5 in (1.96 m)	—	Sr
G		James Nance	6 ft 2 in (1.88 m)	—	Fr
		Wayne McKinney	6 ft 5 in (1.96 m)	—	So
C		Anthony Todd	6 ft 9 in (2.06 m)	—	Fr
G		Tony Kellybrew	6 ft 2 in (1.88 m)	—	Jr
G		Darrin Sublet	6 ft 4 in (1.93 m)	—	Fr
C		Brad Olson	6 ft 10 in (2.08 m)	—	Sr

Head coach

- Pat Foster (Arkansas)

Assistant coach(es)

Legend

- (C) Team captain
- (S) Suspended
- (I) Ineligible
- (W) Walk-on
- Injured
- Current redshirt

Roster
Last update: December 18, 2023

== Schedule and results ==
Date time, TV	Rank^{#}	Opponent^{#}	Result	Record	Site (attendance) city, state
Non-conference regular season
Nov 26, 1983*		at Wichita State	L 58–59	0–1	Charles Koch Arena (10,666); Wichita, Kansas
Nov 28, 1983*		St. Mary's (TX)	W 78–57	1–1	Beaumont Civic Center (4,212); Beaumont, Texas
Dec 5, 1983*		Texas State	W 77–56	2–1	Beaumont Civic Center (4,344); Beaumont, Texas
Dec 9, 1983*		vs. Saint Mary's (CA); Cougar Classic	W 61–57	3–1	Marriott Center (22,668); Provo, Utah
Dec 10, 1983*		vs. Utah State; Cougar Classic	L 58–59	3–2	Marriott Center (22,668); Provo, Utah
Dec 12, 1983*		at Weber State	W 58–55	4–2	Dee Events Center (8,668); Ogden, Utah
Dec 16, 1983*		vs. Northern Arizona; Holiday Tournament	W 91–61	5–2	Roberts Municipal Stadium (7,612); Evansville, Indiana
Dec 17, 1983*		at Evansville; Holiday Tournament	W 81–71	6–2	Roberts Municipal Stadium (7,667); Evansville, Indiana
Dec 22, 1983*		Hardin–Simmons	W 109–63	7–2	Beaumont Civic Center (4,134); Beaumont, Texas
Dec 29, 1983*		vs. Eastern Michigan; Blade/Glass City Classic	W 78–70 ^{3OT}	8–2	Centennial Hall (4,500); Toledo, Ohio
Dec 30, 1983*		at Toledo; Blade/Glass City Classic	W 81–78	9–2	Centennial Hall (8,042); Toledo, Ohio
Jan 10, 1984*		UTSA	W 75–51	10–2	Beaumont Civic Center (5,013); Beaumont, Texas
Southland regular season
Jan 14, 1984		Arkansas State	W 86–53	11–2 (1–0)	Beaumont Civic Center (5,445); Beaumont, Texas
Jan 19, 1984		at Northeast Louisiana	W 77–60	12–2 (2–0)	Fant–Ewing Coliseum (1,740); Monroe, Louisiana
Jan 21, 1984		at Louisiana Tech	L 60–83	12–3 (2–1)	Thomas Assembly Center (4,415); Ruston, Louisiana
Jan 26, 1984		UT Arlington	W 110–79	13–3 (3–1)	Beaumont Civic Center (4,969); Beaumont, Texas
Jan 28, 1984		North Texas	W 96–69	14–3 (4–1)	Beaumont Civic Center (5,499); Beaumont, Texas
Feb 2, 1984		at McNeese	W 68–54	15–3 (5–1)	Lake Charles Civic Center (4,898); Lake Charles, Louisiana
Feb 6, 1984*		Pan American; Non–conference	W 85–61	16–3	Beaumont Civic Center (4,835); Beaumont, Texas
Feb 9, 1984		at Arkansas State	W 77–65	17–3 (6–1)	Indian Fieldhouse (4,311); Jonesboro, Arkansas
Feb 11, 1984		Northeast Louisiana	W 68–66	18–3 (7–1)	Beaumont Civic Center (5,581); Beaumont, Texas
Feb 16, 1984		Louisiana Tech	W 85–60	19–3 (8–1)	Beaumont Civic Center (5,923); Beaumont, Texas
Feb 18, 1984		at UT Arlington	W 94–73	20–3 (9–1)	Texas Hall (1,150); Arlington, Texas
Feb 23, 1984		at North Texas	W 89–66	21–3 (10–1)	The Super Pit (2,300); Denton, Texas
Feb 25, 1984		McNeese	W 86–79	22–3 (11–1)	Beaumont Civic Center (5,667); Beaumont, Texas
Feb 27, 1984*		at Pan American; Non–conference	W 66–63	23–3	Pan Am Fieldhouse (3,374); Edinburg, Texas
Feb 29, 1984*		at UTSA; Non–conference	W 86–73	24–3	Convocation Center (4,040); San Antonio, Texas
Southland tournament
Mar 9, 1984		McNeese State; Semifinals	W 85–66	25–3	Beaumont Civic Center (5,538); Beaumont, Texas
Mar 10, 1984		Louisiana Tech; Championship game	L 65–68	25–4	Beaumont Civic Center (5,553); Beaumont, Texas
National Invitation Tournament
Mar 14, 1984*		at New Mexico; First round	W 64–61	26–4	The Pit (12,971); Albuquerque, New Mexico
Mar 19, 1983*		Santa Clara; Second round	L 74–76	26–5	Beaumont Civic Center (5,932); Beaumont, Texas
*Non-conference game. ^{#}Rankings from AP Poll. (#) Tournament seedings in parentheses. All times are in Central Time.
