= Brandon Fortenberry =

American basketball player

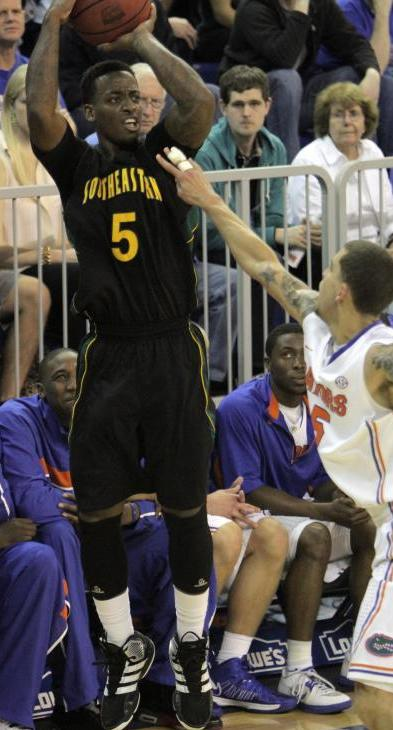

Personal information
- Born: May 18, 1990 (age 36) Picayune, Mississippi
- Listed height: 6 ft 3 in (1.91 m)
- Listed weight: 185 lb (84 kg)

Career information
- High school: Picayune (Picayune, Mississippi)
- College: Southeastern Louisiana (2008–2013)
- NBA draft: 2013: undrafted
- Playing career: 2013–present
- Position: Shooting guard

Career history
- 2015–2016: Balkan Botevgrad
- 2016–2017: Igokea
- 2017–2018: Balkan Botevgrad

Career highlights
- First-team All-Southland (2013); Third-team All-Southland (2011)

Brandon Fortenberry (born May 18, 1990) is an American professional basketball player for Balkan Botevgrad of the Bulgarian National Basketball League. He played college basketball for Southeastern Louisiana University He was born in Picayune.

== Career ==
In the 2011–12 season, as a senior in the Picayune Memorial High School, he was played only seven games because of a foot injury. He was later named a Preseason All-Southland Conference selection.

Fortenberry was selected by the Bakersfield Jam in the round 6 of the 2013 NBA Development League Draft. He left the Jam before the start of the season. He did not play pro basketball from 2013 to 2015.

For the 2015–16 season he signed with Balkan Botevgrad of the Bulgarian NBL. In 33 games he averaged 13.4 points per game. He was named the best foreign player in the 2015–16 Bulgarian championship.

On July 22, 2016, Fortenberry signed with Igokea for the 2016–17 season. On January 11, 2017, he was released by Igokea. In 15 ABA League games, he averaged 5.5 points, 2.1 rebounds and 1.7 assists per game.

On July 22, 2017, Fortenberry returned to Balkan Botevgrad.
