= 2004–05 Southeastern Louisiana Lions basketball team =

American college basketball season

2004–05 Southeastern Louisiana Lions basketball
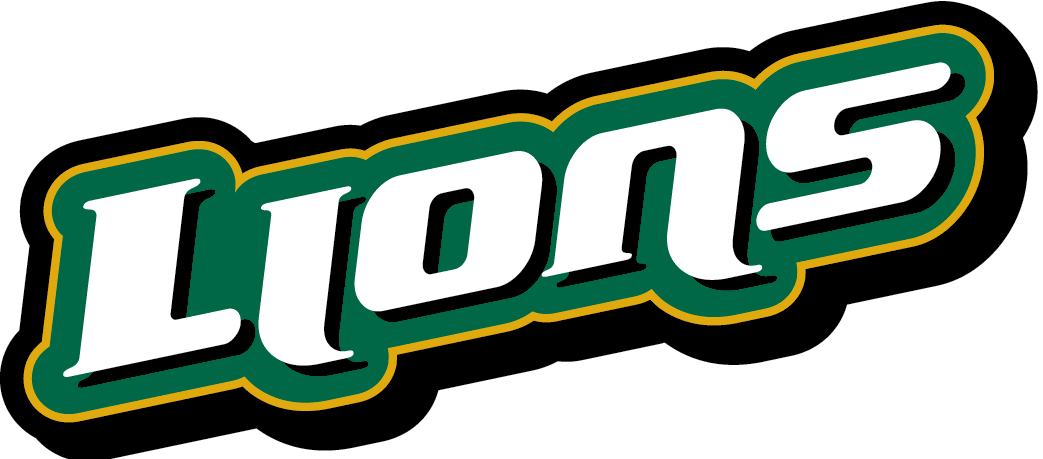

Southland tournament champions Southland regular season co-champions

NCAA tournament, First round
- Conference: Southland Conference
- Record: 24–9 (13–3 Southland)
- Head coach: Billy Kennedy (6th season)
- Home arena: University Center (Capacity: 7,500)

2004–05 Southland Conference men's basketball standings
	Conf.				Overall
Team	W		L	PCT	W		L	PCT
Southeastern Louisiana †	13	–	3	.813	24	–	9	.727
Northwestern State	13	–	3	.813	21	–	12	.636
Sam Houston State	11	–	5	.688	18	–	12	.600
UTSA	10	–	6	.625	15	–	13	.536
Lamar	9	–	7	.563	18	–	11	.621
Texas State	8	–	8	.500	14	–	14	.500
McNeese State	8	–	8	.500	13	–	15	.464
Texas–Arlington	7	–	9	.438	13	–	15	.464
Stephen F. Austin	6	–	10	.375	12	–	15	.444
Louisiana–Monroe	2	–	14	.125	8	–	19	.296
Nicholls State	1	–	15	.063	6	–	21	.222
† 2005 Southland tournament winner

The 2004–05 Southeastern Louisiana Lions basketball team represented Southeastern Louisiana University during the 2004–05 NCAA Division I men's basketball season. The Lions, led by sixth-year head coach Billy Kennedy, played their home games at the University Center in Hammond, Louisiana as members of the Southland Conference. They finished the season 24–9, 13–3 in Southland play to finish in a tie for the Southland regular season championship with Northwestern State. As the No. 2 seed in the Southland tournament, they defeated Texas State, Sam Houston State, and Northwestern State to earn the conference's automatic bid to the NCAA tournament – the first, and only, appearance in program history. Playing as the No. 15 seed in the Chicago region, the Lions were beaten by No. 2 seed Oklahoma State in the opening round.

== Roster ==
2004–05 Southeastern Louisiana Lions men's basketball team
Players
Coaches

Pos.	#	Name	Height	Weight	Year	Hometown
F	1	Ricky Woods	6 ft 6 in (1.98 m)	210 lb (95 kg)	Jr	New Orleans, Louisiana
G	10	Terry Bryant	6 ft 1 in (1.85 m)	170 lb (77 kg)	So	Hattiesburg, Mississippi
G	12	Scott Roniger	6 ft 2 in (1.88 m)	180 lb (82 kg)	Jr	Metairie, Louisiana
G	13	Neill Berry	6 ft 3 in (1.91 m)	190 lb (86 kg)	Sr	Madison, Mississippi
G	20	Thomas Woods	6 ft 1 in (1.85 m)	175 lb (79 kg)	Fr	New Orleans, Louisiana
F	21	Justin Edwards	6 ft 4 in (1.93 m)	215 lb (98 kg)	So	Detroit, Michigan
G	22	Chris Lee	6 ft 3 in (1.91 m)	185 lb (84 kg)	Jr	Shawnee Mission, Kansas
	23	Cavin Payton	6 ft 4 in (1.93 m)	190 lb (86 kg)	Fr	Moss Point, Mississippi
G	24	Jonathan Patton	6 ft 2 in (1.88 m)	200 lb (91 kg)	Sr	Picayune, Mississippi
C	25	Nate Lofton	6 ft 10 in (2.08 m)	250 lb (113 kg)	Sr	New Orleans, Louisiana
G	32	Michael Cyprien	6 ft 3 in (1.91 m)	180 lb (82 kg)	So	New Orleans, Louisiana
G	33	Dee Gadsden	6 ft 2 in (1.88 m)	185 lb (84 kg)	Sr	Marietta, Georgia
C	42	Jonathan Walker	6 ft 8 in (2.03 m)	215 lb (98 kg)	Jr	Atlanta, Georgia
C	52	Leonard Harden	6 ft 9 in (2.06 m)	260 lb (118 kg)	Jr	Detroit, Michigan

Head coach

- Billy Kennedy (Southeastern Louisiana)

Assistant coach(es)

Legend

- (C) Team captain
- (S) Suspended
- (I) Ineligible
- (W) Walk-on
- Injured
- Current redshirt

Roster

== Schedule and results ==
Date time, TV	Rank^{#}	Opponent^{#}	Result	Record	Site (attendance) city, state
Non-conference regular season
Nov 19, 2004*		vs. Henderson State	W 73–59	1–0	Taco Bell Arena (1,119); Boise, Idaho
Nov 20, 2004*		vs. Idaho	W 63–54	2–0	Taco Bell Arena (674); Boise, Idaho
Nov 21, 2004*		at Boise State	W 56–48	3–0	Taco Bell Arena (2,177); Boise, Idaho
Nov 24, 2004*		at Southern Miss	L 62–65	3–1	Reed Green Coliseum (3,736); Hattiesburg, Mississippi
Nov 30, 2004*		LSU–Shreveport	W 80–53	4–1	University Center (728); Hammond, Louisiana
Dec 3, 2004*		vs. Arkansas–Little Rock	L 48–58	4–2	Hammons Student Center (6,147); Springfield, Missouri
Dec 4, 2004*		vs. Youngstown State	W 77–55	5–2	Hammons Student Center (6,186); Springfield, Missouri
Dec 11, 2004*		at Southern	L 65–67	5–3	F. G. Clark Center (754); Baton Rouge, Louisiana
Dec 15, 2004*		Wiley	W 82–51	6–3	University Center (676); Hammond, Louisiana
Dec 18, 2004*		at Houston	L 61–68	6–4	Hofheinz Pavilion (3,080); Houston, Texas
Dec 22, 2004*		Loyola (LA)	W 62–35	7–4	University Center (402); Hammond, Louisiana
Dec 31, 2004*		at Ole Miss	L 48–64	7–5	Tad Smith Coliseum (2,044); University, Mississippi
Jan 3, 2005*		Arkansas Baptist	W 83–61	8–5	University Center (286); Hammond, Louisiana
Southland regular season
Jan 5, 2005		Lamar	W 60–56	9–5 (1–0)	University Center (637); Hammond, Louisiana
Jan 8, 2005		Texas–Arlington	W 57–41	10–5 (2–0)	University Center (822); Hammond, Louisiana
Jan 11, 2005		Sam Houston State	W 56–54	11–5 (3–0)	University Center (787); Hammond, Louisiana
Jan 15, 2005		at Northwestern State	L 63–65	11–6 (3–1)	Prather Coliseum (2,812); Natchitoches, Louisiana
Jan 19, 2005		at Lamar	W 66–60	12–6 (4–1)	Montagne Center (4,641); Beaumont, Texas
Jan 27, 2005		Texas State	W 51–39	13–6 (5–1)	University Center (2,035); Hammond, Louisiana
Jan 29, 2005		at UTSA	W 63–54	14–6 (6–1)	Convocation Center (1,535); San Antonio, Texas
Feb 2, 2005		at Nicholls State	W 60–49	15–6 (7–1)	Stopher Gym (1,049); Thibodaux, Louisiana
Feb 5, 2005		Stephen F. Austin	W 54–33	16–6 (8–1)	University Center (1,216); Hammond, Louisiana
Feb 10, 2005		at Louisiana–Monroe	W 70–57	17–6 (9–1)	Fant–Ewing Coliseum (1,426); Monroe, Louisiana
Feb 12, 2005		McNeese State	L 69–71	17–7 (9–2)	University Center (1,289); Hammond, Louisiana
Feb 17, 2005		UTSA	W 69–66	18–7 (10–2)	University Center (1,328); Hammond, Louisiana
Feb 19, 2005		at Stephen F. Austin	W 52–41	19–7 (11–2)	William R. Johnson Coliseum (1,438); Nacogdoches, Texas
Feb 26, 2005		Louisiana–Monroe	W 64–62	20–7 (12–2)	University Center (2,612); Hammond, Louisiana
Mar 2, 2005		McNeese State	L 68–76	20–8 (12–3)	Burton Coliseum (1,080); Lake Charles, Louisiana
Mar 5, 2005		at Sam Houston State	W 58–55	21–8 (13–3)	Johnson Coliseum (2,649); Huntsville, Texas
Southland tournament
Mar 8, 2005*	(2)	(7) Texas State; Quarterfinals	W 75–58	22–8	University Center (1,786); Hammond, Louisiana
Mar 10, 2005*	(2)	(3) Sam Houston State; Semifinals	W 71–62	23–8	University Center (2,921); Hammond, Louisiana
Mar 13, 2005*; 2:00 p.m., ESPN2	(2)	at (1) Northwestern State; Championship game	W 49–42	24–8	Prather Coliseum (3,623); Natchitoches, Louisiana
NCAA tournament
Mar 18, 2005*	(15 CHI)	vs. (2 CHI) No. 6 Oklahoma State; First round	L 50–63	24–9	Ford Center (18,567); Oklahoma City, Oklahoma
*Non-conference game. ^{#}Rankings from AP Poll. (#) Tournament seedings in parentheses. CHI=Chicago. All times are in Central Time.
