= 2005 Southland Conference men's basketball tournament =

American basketball tournament

- Classification: Division I
- Season: 2004–05
- Teams: 8
- First round site: Campus sites
- Semifinals site: Campus sites
- Finals site: Prather Coliseum; Natchitoches, Louisiana
- Champions: Southeastern Louisiana (1st title)
- Winning coach: Billy Kennedy (1st title)
- MVP: Ricky Woods (Southeastern Louisiana)

2004–05 Southland Conference men's basketball standings
	Conf.				Overall
Team	W		L	PCT	W		L	PCT
Southeastern Louisiana †	13	–	3	.813	24	–	9	.727
Northwestern State	13	–	3	.813	21	–	12	.636
Sam Houston State	11	–	5	.688	18	–	12	.600
UTSA	10	–	6	.625	15	–	13	.536
Lamar	9	–	7	.563	18	–	11	.621
Texas State	8	–	8	.500	14	–	14	.500
McNeese State	8	–	8	.500	13	–	15	.464
Texas–Arlington	7	–	9	.438	13	–	15	.464
Stephen F. Austin	6	–	10	.375	12	–	15	.444
Louisiana–Monroe	2	–	14	.125	8	–	19	.296
Nicholls State	1	–	15	.063	6	–	21	.222
† 2005 Southland tournament winner

The 2005 Southland Conference men's basketball tournament took place March 8–13, 2005. The quarterfinal and semifinal rounds were played at the home arena of the higher seeded-teams, with the championship game played at Prather Coliseum in Natchitoches, Louisiana.

Top-seeded Southeastern Louisiana won the championship game over second-seeded Northwestern State, and earned the conference's automatic bid to the NCAA tournament. Ricky Woods of Southeastern Louisiana was named the tournament's MVP.

== Format ==
The top eight eligible men's basketball teams in the Southland Conference received a berth in the conference tournament. After the conference season, teams were seeded by conference record. For the semifinal round, the remaining teams were reseeded.

== Bracket ==
Quarterfinals; March 8
1	Northwestern State	71
8	Texas–Arlington	67
4	UTSA	83
5	Lamar	91
(Pairings are reseeded after the first round)
3	Sam Houston State	88
6	McNeese State	70
2	Southeastern Louisiana	75
7	Texas State	58

Semifinals; March 10
1	Northwestern State	90
5	Lamar	75
2	Southeastern Louisiana	71
3	Sam Houston State	62

Finals; March 13
1	Northwestern State	42
2	Southeastern Louisiana	49
