= 1993–94 Southwest Texas State Bobcats men's basketball team =

American college basketball season

1993–94 Southwest Texas State Bobcats men's basketball

Southland tournament champions

NCAA tournament
- Conference: Southland Conference
- Record: 25–7 (14–4 Southland)
- Head coach: Jim Wooldridge (3rd season)
- Home arena: Strahan Arena

1993–94 Southland Conference men's basketball standings
	Conf.				Overall
Team	W		L	PCT	W		L	PCT
NE Louisiana	15	–	3	.833	19	–	9	.679
SW Texas State †	14	–	4	.778	25	–	7	.781
Nicholls State	12	–	6	.667	19	–	9	.679
North Texas	9	–	9	.500	14	–	15	.483
McNeese State	9	–	9	.500	11	–	16	.407
UTSA	8	–	10	.444	12	–	15	.444
Sam Houston State	7	–	11	.389	7	–	20	.259
Northwestern State	6	–	12	.333	11	–	15	.423
Stephen F. Austin	6	–	12	.333	9	–	18	.333
Texas–Arlington	4	–	14	.222	7	–	22	.241
† 1994 Southland Conference tournament winner Rankings from AP Poll

The 1993–94 Southwest Texas State Bobcats men's basketball team represented Southwest Texas State University in the 1993–94 NCAA Division I men's basketball season. The Bobcats, led by head coach Jim Wooldridge, played their home games at Strahan Arena in San Marcos, Texas as members of the Southland Conference.

The Bobcats finished second in the regular season conference standings, and then won the Southland tournament to receive the conference's automatic bid to the NCAA tournament – the first appearance in program history. As No. 15 seed in the Midwest region, Southwest Texas State was beaten by No. 2 seed UMass, 78–60.

== Roster ==
1993–94 Texas State Bobcats men's basketball team
Players	Coaches
Pos. / # / Name / Height / Weight / Year / Hometown; F / / Lynwood Wade / 6 ft 4 in (1.93 m) / — / Sr	Head coach: Jim Wooldridge (Louisiana Tech); Assistant coach(es) Legend: (C) Team captain; (S) Suspended; (I) Ineligible; (W) Walk-on; Injured; Current redshirt; Roster

== Schedule and results ==
Date time, TV	Rank^{#}	Opponent^{#}	Result	Record	Site (attendance) city, state
Regular season
Dec 17, 1993*		vs. Kansas State	L 58–59	4–2	Neal S. Blaisdell Center; Honolulu, Hawaii
Dec 18, 1993*		vs. Mercer	W 69–51	5–2	Neal S. Blaisdell Center; Honolulu, Hawaii
Southland tournament
Mar 4, 1994*		vs. Sam Houston State; Quarterfinals	W 65–56	23–6	Fant-Ewing Coliseum; Monroe, Louisiana
Mar 5, 1994*		vs. Nicholls State; Semifinals	W 68–65	24–6	Fant-Ewing Coliseum; Monroe, Louisiana
Mar 6, 1994*		vs. North Texas; Championship game	W 69–60	25–6	Fant-Ewing Coliseum; Monroe, Louisiana
NCAA tournament
Mar 17, 1994*	(15 MW)	vs. (2 MW) No. 8 UMass; First round	L 60–78	25–7	Kansas Coliseum; Wichita, Kansas
*Non-conference game. ^{#}Rankings from AP Poll. (#) Tournament seedings in parentheses. MW=Midwest. All times are in Central.
