= 1982–83 Lamar Cardinals basketball team =

American college basketball season

1982–83 Lamar Cardinals men's basketball

Southland Conference regular season and tournament champions

1983 NCAA Division I men's basketball tournament, Round of 32
- Conference: Southland Conference
- Record: 23–8 (9–3 Southland)
- Head coach: Pat Foster (3rd season)
- Home arena: Beaumont Civic Center (Capacity: 6,500)

1982–83 Southland Conference men's basketball standings
	Conf.				Overall
Team	W		L	PCT	W		L	PCT
Lamar †	9	–	3	.750	23	–	8	.742
Louisiana Tech	8	–	4	.667	19	–	9	.679
McNeese State	6	–	6	.500	16	–	13	.552
Northeast Louisiana	6	–	6	.500	14	–	14	.500
Arkansas State	5	–	7	.417	17	–	12	.586
North Texas State	5	–	7	.417	15	–	15	.500
Texas-Arlington	3	–	9	.250	9	–	19	.321
† 1983 Southland tournament winner Rankings from AP poll

The 1982–83 Lamar Cardinals basketball team represented Lamar University during the 1982–83 NCAA Division I men's basketball season. The Cardinals were led by third-year head coach Pat Foster and played their home games at the Beaumont Civic Center in Beaumont, Texas as members of the Southland Conference. The Cardinals won the regular season conference championship and the 1983 Southland Conference men's basketball tournament. They received an automatic invitation to the 1983 NCAA Division I men's basketball tournament where they defeated Alabama in the first round and lost to Villanova in the second round. Lamar finished the season with a record of 23–8 (9–3 Southland).

== Roster ==
1982–83 Lamar Cardinals men's basketball team
Players
Coaches

Pos.	#	Name	Height	Weight	Year	Hometown
G		Tom Sewell	6 ft 5 in (1.96 m)	—	Jr	Pensacola, FL
		Kenneth Perkins	6 ft 6 in (1.98 m)	—	Jr	Beaumont, TX
G		Bryan Kellybrew	6 ft 5 in (1.96 m)	185 lb (84 kg)	Sr
G		Lamont Robinson	6 ft 2 in (1.88 m)	—	Jr
		Randy Gray	6 ft 9 in (2.06 m)	—	Jr
G		Nicky Snell	6 ft 2 in (1.88 m)	—	Sr
		George Milhouse	6 ft 5 in (1.96 m)	—	Jr
		Wayne McKinney	6 ft 5 in (1.96 m)	—	Fr
G		Ronnie Wennberg	6 ft 3 in (1.91 m)	—	Jr
		Brad Olson	6 ft 10 in (2.08 m)	—	Jr

Head coach

- Pat Foster (Arkansas)

Assistant coach(es)

Legend

- (C) Team captain
- (S) Suspended
- (I) Ineligible
- (W) Walk-on
- Injured
- Current redshirt

Roster
Last update: December 18, 2023

== Schedule and results ==
Date time, TV	Rank^{#}	Opponent^{#}	Result	Record	Site (attendance) city, state
Non-conference regular season
Nov 26, 1982*		vs. UTSA; Kettle Classic	W 79–59	1–0	Hofheinz Pavilion (8,000); Houston, Texas
Nov 27, 1982*		at No. 14 Houston; Kettle Classic	L 72–106	1–1	Hofheinz Pavilion (8,000); Houston, Texas
Nov 30, 1982*		at Texas State	W 57–44	2–1	Strahan Coliseum (2,320); San Marcos, Texas
Dec 6, 1982*		Sienna Heights	W 85–51	3–1	Beaumont Civic Center (4,293); Beaumont, Texas
Dec 11, 1982*		at Hardin-Simmons	W 81–60	4–1	Mabee Complex (2,149); Abilene, Texas
Dec 13, 1982*		Pan American	W 83–45	5–1	Beaumont Civic Center (3,966); Beaumont, Texas
Dec 20, 1982*		Rice	W 56–49	6–1	Beaumont Civic Center (3,912); Beaumont, Texas
Dec 22, 1982*		at Boise State	W 75–59	7–1	BSU Pavilion (2,252); Boise, Idaho
Dec 26, 1982*		vs. Drake; Far West Classic	W 66–54	8–1	(9,218); Portland, Oregon
Dec 27, 1982*		vs. Oregon State; Far West Classic	L 61–76	8–2	(9,506); Portland, Oregon
Dec 28, 1982*		vs. Oregon; Far West Classic	L 41–50	8–3	(12,117); Portland, Oregon
Jan 10, 1983*		St. Mary's	W 70–47	9–3	Beaumont Civic Center (4,859); Beaumont, Texas
Southland regular season
Jan 15, 1983		at Arkansas State	W 59–56	10–3 (1–0)	Indian Fieldhouse (4,273); Jonesboro, Arkansas
Jan 20, 1983		Northeast Louisiana	W 83–53	11–3 (2–0)	Beaumont Civic Center (4,773); Beaumont, Texas
Jan 22, 1983		Louisiana Tech	W 51–43	12–3 (3–0)	Beaumont Civic Center (5,202); Beaumont, Texas
Jan 24, 1983*		at UTSA; Non–conference	W 60–58	13–3	Convocation Center (2,063); San Antonio, Texas
Jan 27, 1983		at UT Arlington	W 81–69	14–3 (4–0)	Texas Hall (1,834); Arlington, Texas
Jan 29, 1983		at North Texas	L 55–61	14–4 (4–1)	The Super Pit (3,425); Denton, Texas
Feb 3, 1983		McNeese	W 93–62	15–4 (5–1)	Beaumont Civic Center (5,585); Beaumont, Texas
Feb 5, 1983*		at Louisville; Non–conference	L 60–85	15–5	Freedom Hall (16,613); Louisville, Kentucky
Feb 9, 1983		Arkansas State	W 62–47	16–5 (6–1)	Beaumont Civic Center (3,518); Beaumont, Texas
Feb 12, 1983		at Northeast Louisiana	L 67–68 ^{2OT}	16–6 (6–2)	Fant–Ewing Coliseum (2,407); Monroe, Louisiana
Feb 12, 1983		at Louisiana Tech	L 79–88	16–7 (6–3)	Thomas Assembly Center (3,205); Ruston, Louisiana
Feb 19, 1983		UT Arlington	W 104–69	17–7 (7–3)	Beaumont Civic Center (3,993); Beaumont, Texas
Feb 24, 1983		North Texas	W 71–63	18–7 (8–3)	Beaumont Civic Center (5,221); Beaumont, Texas
Feb 26, 1983		McNeese	W 45–41	19–7 (9–3)	Lake Charles Civic Center (5,000); Lake Charles, Louisiana
Mar 5, 1983*		Pan American; Non–conference	W 60–51	20–7	UTPA Fieldhouse (1,118); Edinburg, Texas
Southland tournament
Mar 11, 1983*		Arkansas State; Semifinals	W 66–46	21–7	Beaumont Civic Center (4,228); Beaumont, Texas
Mar 12, 1983*		North Texas; Championship game	W 75–54	22–7	Beaumont Civic Center (4,341); Beaumont, Texas
NCAA Division I men's basketball tournament
Mar 17, 1983*	(11 MW)	vs. (6 MW) Alabama; First round	W 73–50	23–7	The Summit (15,400); Houston, Texas
Mar 19, 1983*	(11 MW)	vs. (3 MW) No. 13 Villanova; Second round	L 58–60	23–8	The Summit (15,400); Houston, Texas
*Non-conference game. ^{#}Rankings from AP Poll. (#) Tournament seedings in parentheses. All times are in Central Time.
