= Ryan Stuart =

Bahamian former basketball player

Personal information
- Listed height: 6 ft 4 in (1.93 m)

Career information
- College: Lon Morris College (1989–1991); Louisiana–Monroe (1991–1993)
- NBA draft: 1993: undrafted
- Position: Small forward

Career highlights
- 2× Southland Player of the Year (1992, 1993); 2× Southland tournament MVP (1992, 1993)

Ryan Stuart is a Bahamian former basketball player who is best known for his college career at the University of Louisiana at Monroe between 1991–92 and 1992–93, which was known as Northeast Louisiana University when he attended.

A 6 ft 4 in (1.93 m) forward, Stuart moved to the United States as a youth. He briefly played on his high school's varsity team, but quit because he wasn't getting enough playing time. After graduation, Stuart worked at his father's electric shop and was playing basketball at the local YMCA gym, where he was discovered by a scout from Lon Morris College in Texas and eventually enrolled there. He spent two years playing basketball at the junior college and averaged 24 points and 14 rebounds his sophomore year, was named MVP of the Texas JUCO all-star game & earned honorable mention JUCO All-American honors by Street & Smith magazine. He then went on to Northeast Louisiana for his final two seasons. In each of his two years as a Warhawk (known as the Indians at that time), Stuart led the Southland Conference in scoring. They earned berths into the NCAA tournament each season, and Stuart broke the 20-point scoring mark both times in losing causes to the Harold Miner-led USC Trojans in the 1992 tourney and the Acie Earl-led Iowa Hawkeyes in 1993, respectively. Stuart was named the Southland Conference Men's Basketball Player of the Year both times as well, becoming the first player since Andrew Toney to do so; and was also named conference Newcomer Of The Year after the 1991-92 season. Additionally, Stuart was named the Southland Conference tournament MVP each year as he led Northeast Louisiana to conference tournament championships. The Louisiana Sports Writers Association chose him as their Louisiana State Player of the Year in both 1992 and 1993. One reporter even called Stuart the conference's most dominant player since Karl Malone. Stuart, however, was never selected in the 1993 NBA draft despite his successful collegiate career.

In 2016, Stuart was inducted into the ULM L Club Hall of Fame.
