= Ricky Woods =

American basketball player (born 1984)

Personal information
- Born: July 27, 1984 (age 41) New Orleans, Louisiana, U.S.
- Listed height: 194 cm (6 ft 4 in)
- Listed weight: 109 kg (240 lb)

Career information
- High school: Carver (New Orleans, Louisiana)
- College: Norfolk State (2002–2003); Paris JC (2003–2004); Southeastern Louisiana (2004–2006)
- NBA draft: 2006: undrafted
- Playing career: 2006–2014
- Position: Forward
- Number: 24

Career history
- 2006–2007: Stal Ostrów Wielkopolski
- 2007–2008: Alerta Cantabria Lobos
- 2008–2009: Hapoel Beeri
- 2009–2010: Oita Heat Devils
- 2010–2011: Elitzur Ramla
- 2011: Toros de Nuevo Laredo
- 2011–2012: Akita Northern Happinets
- 2012–2013: Miyazaki Shining Suns
- 2013–2014: Tokyo Cinq Rêves

Career highlights
- Southland Player of the Year (2006); 2× First-team All-Southland (2005, 2006); Southland Newcomer of the Year (2005); Southland tournament MVP (2005)

Ricky Woods (born July 27, 1984) is an American former professional basketball player. On November 1, 2007, he was selected by the Idaho Stampede with the 29th overall pick in the 2007 NBA D-League draft.

== College statistics ==
Year	Team	GP	GS	MPG	FG%	3P%	FT%	RPG	APG	SPG	BPG	PPG
2002–03	Norfolk State	29	1	18.3	.540	.091	.483	3.59	0.62	1.03	0.97	6.66
2003–04	Paris JC											
2004–05	Southeastern Louisiana	33	31	30.1	.559	.250	.652	6.79	0.94	1.70	0.79	17.15
2005–06	Southeastern Louisiana	26	24	31.0	.498	.250	.644	10.08	1.96	1.65	1.27	16.19
Career		88	56	26.5	.534	.158	.619	6.70	1.14	1.47	0.99	13.41

=== NCAA Awards & Honors ===
- Southland Player of the Year – 2006
- All-Southland First Team – 2005, 2006
- Southland Tournament MVP – 2005
- Southland All-Tournament Team – 2005
- Southland Newcomer of the Year – 2005

== Career statistics ==
Legend
GP	Games played	GS	Games started	MPG	Minutes per game
FG%	Field goal percentage	3P%	3-point field goal percentage	FT%	Free throw percentage
RPG	Rebounds per game	APG	Assists per game	SPG	Steals per game
BPG	Blocks per game	PPG	Points per game	**Bold**	Career high

=== Regular season ===
Year	Team	GP	GS	MPG	FG%	3P%	FT%	RPG	APG	SPG	BPG	PPG
2005–06	Cantabria	1		14.0	.600	.500	.000	2.0	0.0	1.0	0.0	7.0
2005–06	Ginásio	32		37.1	.492	.278	.682	7.7	2.1	2.8	0.8	20.4
2009–10	Oita	50	49	34.4	.487	.194	.592	11.7	3.3	2.1	0.6	24.1
2010–11	Ramla	4		27.3	.457	.333	.533	6.0	1.3	0.8	1.0	13.3
2011–12	Toros	2	1	13.0	.286	.000	.750	3.00	0.50	0.50	0.00	3.50
2011–12	Akita	41	36	30.4	.454	.174	.665	9.7	3.8	1.5	0.4	20.6
2012–13	Miyazaki/Tokyo CR	41	31	34.1	.406	.256	.737	9.9	4.0	1.7	0.3	21.9
2013–14	Tokyo CR	45		36.3	.423	.207	.686	8.9	3.4	1.7	0.3	21.4

=== Playoffs ===
Year	Team	GP	GS	MPG	FG%	3P%	FT%	RPG	APG	SPG	BPG	PPG
2006–07	Cantabria	4		13.3	.400	.500	.625	3.5	0.3	0.3	0.0	6.0
2011–12	Akita	4		27.5	.458	.000	.750	7.0	3.0	2.3	0.5	18.0
