= Texas A&M Aggies men's basketball statistical leaders =

The Texas A&M Aggies men's basketball statistical leaders are individual statistical leaders of the Texas A&M Aggies men's basketball program in various categories, including points, assists, blocks, rebounds, and steals. Within those areas, the lists identify single-game, single-season, and career leaders. The Aggies represent Texas A&M University in the NCAA's Southeastern Conference.

Texas A&M began competing in intercollegiate basketball in 1912. However, the school's record book does not generally list records from before the 1950s, as records from before this period are often incomplete and inconsistent. Since scoring was much lower in this era, and teams played much fewer games during a typical season, it is likely that few or no players from this era would appear on these lists anyway.

The NCAA did not officially record assists as a stat until the 1983–84 season, and blocks and steals until the 1985–86 season, but Texas A&M's record books includes players in these stats before these seasons. These lists are updated through the end of the 2021–22 season.

== Scoring ==
Career
Rk	Player	Points	Seasons
1	Wade Taylor IV	2,058	2021–22 2022–23 2023–24 2024–25
2	Bernard King	1,990	1999–00 2000–01 2001–02 2002–03
3	Vernon Smith	1,778	1977–78 1978–79 1979–80 1980–81
4	Joseph Jones	1,679	2004–05 2005–06 2006–07 2007–08
5	Acie Law IV	1,669	2003–04 2004–05 2005–06 2006–07
6	John Beasley	1,594	1963–64 1964–65 1965–66
7	Winston Crite	1,576	1983–84 1984–85 1985–86 1986–87
8	Josh Carter	1,566	2005–06 2006–07 2007–08 2008–09
9	Donald Sloan	1,522	2006–07 2007–08 2008–09 2009–10
10	Rynn Wright	1,495	1977–78 1978–79 1979–80 1980–81

Season
Rk	Player	Points	Season
1	Don Marbury	697	1985–86
2	Joe Wilbert	687	1994–95
	Wade Taylor IV	687	2023–24
4	John Beasley	668	1965–66
5	Tony Milton	639	1989–90
6	John Beasley	619	1964–65
7	Acie Law IV	614	2006–07
8	Donald Sloan	604	2009–10
9	Quenton Jackson	604	2021–22
10	Wade Taylor IV	572	2022–23

Single game
Rk	Player	Points	Season	Opponent
1	Bennie Lenox	53	1963–64	Wyoming
2	John Beasley	44	1965–66	Arkansas
3	John Beasley	43	1964–65	Baylor
	John Beasley	43	1965–66	Baylor
	Bennie Lenox	43	1962–63	Texas
6	Randy Knowles	42	1972–73	Arkansas
7	Wade Taylor IV	41	2023–24	Arkansas
	Don Marbury	41	1984–85	Baylor
9	Elston Turner	40	2012–13	Kentucky
	John Beasley	40	1965–66	TCU
	John Beasley	40	1964–65	Texas

== Rebounds ==
Career
Rk	Player	Rebounds	Seasons
1	Vernon Smith	978	1977–78 1978–79 1979–80 1980–81
2	Winston Crite	913	1983–84 1984–85 1985–86 1986–87
3	Claude Riley	870	1979–80 1980–81 1981–82 1982–83
	Rynn Wright	870	1977–78 1978–79 1979–80 1980–81
5	Rudy Woods	853	1978–79 1979–80 1980–81 1981–82
6	Joseph Jones	843	2004–05 2005–06 2006–07 2007–08
7	Kourtney Roberson	833	2010–11 2011–12 2012–13 2013–14 2014–15
8	Henry Coleman	810	2021–22 2022–23 2023–24 2024–25
9	Jimmie Gilbert	803	1982–83 1983–84 1984–85 1985–86
10	John Beasley	784	1963–64 1964–65 1965–66

Season
Rk	Player	Rebounds	Season
1	Andersson Garcia	327	2023–24
2	Claude Riley	317	1981–82
3	Tyler Davis	313	2017–18
4	Rashaun Agee	296	2025–26
5	Rudy Woods	286	1978–79
	John Beasley	286	1965–66
7	Bryan Davis	277	2009–10
8	Vernon Smith	269	1978–79
9	Ronnie Peret	267	1967–68
10	Barry Davis	264	1975–76

Single game
Rk	Player	Rebounds	Season	Opponent
1	Cedric Joseph	23	1972–73	Angelo State
2	Steve Niles	21	1969–70	Furman
	Vernon Smith	21	1978–79	UNLV
	Rynn Wright	21	1978–79	UNLV
5	Jeff Overhouse	20	1972–73	Texas Tech
	Jeff Overhouse	20	1970–71	Baylor
7	Andersson Garcia	19	2023–24	Houston Christian
	David Harris	19	1989–90	Rice
	David Harris	19	1989–90	Michigan St.
	Cedric Joseph	19	1973–74	Houston Baptist
	Randy Knowles	19	1972–73	Wayland Baptist
	Ronnie Peret	19	1967–68	Texas Tech
	Jerry Windham	19	1961–62	TCU

== Assists ==
Career
Rk	Player	Assists	Seasons
1	Alex Caruso	649	2012–13 2013–14 2014–15 2015–16
2	Dave Goff	625	1976–77 1977–78 1978–79 1979–80
3	David Edwards	602	1991–92 1992–93 1993–94
4	Bernard King	550	1999–00 2000–01 2001–02 2002–03
5	Acie Law IV	545	2003–04 2004–05 2005–06 2006–07
6	Wade Taylor IV	498	2021–22 2022–23 2023–24 2024–25
7	Todd Holloway	491	1983–84 1984–85 1985–86 1986–87
8	Dominique Kirk	382	2004–05 2005–06 2006–07 2007–08
9	Dash Harris	379	2008–09 2009–10 2010–11 2011–12
10	Donald Sloan	370	2006–07 2007–08 2008–09 2009–10

Season
Rk	Player	Assists	Season
1	David Edwards	265	1993–94
2	Dave Goff	216	1977–78
3	Tony Milton	208	1989–90
4	Darryl McDonald	196	1987–88
5	Alex Caruso	185	2015–16
6	Kyle Kessel	183	1995–96
7	Alex Caruso	182	2014–15
8	David Edwards	177	1992–93
9	Alex Caruso	170	2013–14
10	Acie Law IV	169	2006–07

Single game
Rk	Player	Assists	Season	Opponent
1	Kyle Kessel	15	1995–96	TCU
	David Edwards	15	1993–94	TCU
	Tony Milton	15	1989–90	Marshall
	Acie Law IV	15	2006–07	Texas
5	Acie Law IV	14	2004–05	Missouri
	Clifton Cook	14	1998–99	Centenary
	Clifton Cook	14	1998–99	Missouri
	David Edwards	14	1993–94	SMU
	David Edwards	14	1992–93	TCU
	Brooks Thompson	14	1990–91	Texas College
	Dave Goff	14	1976–77	Texas

== Steals ==
Career
Rk	Player	Steals	Seasons
1	Alex Caruso	276	2012–13 2013–14 2014–15 2015–16
2	David Edwards	228	1991–92 1992–93 1993–94
3	Wade Taylor IV	213	2021–22 2022–23 2023–24 2024–25
4	Todd Holloway	208	1983–84 1984–85 1985–86 1986–87
5	Dave Goff	198	1976–77 1977–78 1978–79 1979–80
6	Darryl McDonald	173	1986–87 1987–88
7	Reggie Roberts	160	1980–81 1981–82 1982–83
8	Acie Law IV	156	2003–04 2004–05 2005–06 2006–07
9	Bernard King	152	1999–00 2000–01 2001–02 2002–03
10	Dash Harris	140	2008–09 2009–10 2010–11 2011–12

Season
Rk	Player	Steals	Season
1	Darryl McDonald	90	1987–88
2	Darryl McDonald	83	1986–87
3	David Edwards	80	1993–94
4	David Edwards	79	1991–92
5	Alex Caruso	77	2015–16
6	Quenton Jackson	70	2021–22
7	Alex Caruso	69	2014–15
	Alex Caruso	69	2013–14
	David Edwards	69	1992–93
	Reggie Roberts	69	1981–82

Single game
Rk	Player	Steals	Season	Opponent
1	David Edwards	9	1991–92	Prairie View A&M
	Darryl McDonald	9	1987–88	SMU
	Darryl McDonald	9	1986–87	Lehigh
4	Michael Schmidt	8	1997–98	S.F. Austin
	Todd Holloway	8	1985–86	Texas
	Darnell Williams	8	1983–84	Texas
7	Zhuric Phelps	7	2024–25	Abilene Christian
	B.J. Holmes	7	2010–11	A&M-Corpus Christi
	Acie Law IV	7	2005–06	Oklahoma State
	Steve Houston	7	1997–98	Washington St
	David Edwards	7	1991–92	Houston
	Brooks Thompson	7	1989–90	S.F. Austin
	Darryl McDonald	7	1987–88	Hawaii
	Darryl McDonald	7	1986–87	Iona
	Reggie Roberts	7	1982–83	Arkansas
	Tyren Naulls	7	1981–82	Sam Houston State

== Blocks ==
Career
Rk	Player	Blocks	Seasons
1	Winston Crite	200	1983–84 1984–85 1985–86 1986–87
2	Rudy Woods	192	1978–79 1979–80 1980–81 1981–82
3	Robert Williams	155	2016–17 2017–18
4	Bryan Davis	154	2006–07 2007–08 2008–09 2009–10
5	Jimmie Gilbert	145	1982–83 1983–84 1984–85 1985–86
6	Josh Nebo	124	2018–19 2019–20
7	Tyler Davis	117	2015–16 2016–17 2017–18
8	Calvin Davis	110	1995–96 1996–97 1997–98
9	David Harris	108	1989–90
10	Tonny Trocha-Morelos	98	2014–15 2015–16 2016–17 2017–18

Season
Rk	Player	Blocks	Season
1	David Harris	108	1989–90
2	Robert Williams	78	2017–18
3	Robert Williams	77	2016–17
4	Rudy Woods	68	1979–80
	Josh Nebo	68	1979–80
6	Rudy Woods	65	1978–79
	Winston Crite	65	1984–85
8	Jimmie Gilbert	63	1982–83
9	Winston Crite	62	1986–87
10	Bryan Davis	58	2009–10

Single game
Rk	Player	Blocks	Season	Opponent
1	David Harris	9	1989–90	Baylor
2	Josh Nebo	8	2019–20	Oregon State
	David Harris	8	1989–90	Michigan State
4	Josh Nebo	7	2018–19	South Alabama
	Robert Williams	7	2017–18	Alabama
	Tonny Trocha-Morelos	7	2017–18	Buffalo
7	Robert Williams	6	2016–17	Auburn
	Chinemelu Elonu	6	2008–09	Florida A&M
	Calvin Davis	6	1995–96	TCU
	Calvin Davis	6	1996–97	Illinois-Chicago
	David Harris	6	1989–90	Marshall
	Winston Crite	6	1984–85	TCU
	DeAndre Jordan	6	2007–08	Baylor
