= Rudy Woods =

American basketball player (1959–2016)

Personal information
- Born: October 12, 1959 Bryan, Texas, U.S.
- Died: January 28, 2016 (aged 56) Bryan, Texas, U.S.
- Listed height: 6 ft 11 in (2.11 m)
- Listed weight: 240 lb (109 kg)

Career information
- High school: Bryan (Bryan, Texas)
- College: Texas A&M (1978–1982)
- NBA draft: 1982: 4th round, 73rd overall pick
- Drafted by: Dallas Mavericks
- Playing career: 1982–1987
- Position: Center

Career history
- 1982–1984: Napoli Basket
- 1984–1985: Wisconsin Flyers
- 1985: Lancaster Lightning
- 1985–1986: AMG Sebastiani
- 1986–1987: Breogán

Career highlights
- First-team All-SWC (1979); SWC Freshman of the Year (1979); McDonald's All-American Game MVP (1978)
- Stats at Basketball Reference
Medals
Representing United States
Men's basketball
Summer Universiade
Gold medal – first place	1979 Mexico City	Team competition

Rudy Dewayne Woods (October 12, 1959 – January 28, 2016) was an American professional basketball player. A tall and strong center, he was one of the top prospects in the 1978 high school class. He played 4 years of college basketball for the Texas A&M Aggies, and he was a 4th-round pick in the 1982 NBA draft; however, he never played in the NBA and he had a 5-year career playing professional basketball in Europe (Italy and Spain) and in the CBA.

== High school career ==
Woods started to play basketball at a young age, and as a sophomore in high school he was already 6 ft 10 in tall and a key member of the varsity team. Coached by Bobby Joe Perry, Woods averaged 16.8 points and recorded 439 rebounds in his sophomore year and he was named MVP of his district. That year he scored 257 of his 451 field goal attempts (57%), and 58 of his 131 free throws (44.3%).

In his junior year he averaged 20.5 points per game, and was already regarded as one of the top upcoming players in the nation. Again, he was named the MVP of the high school tournament. As a senior he averaged 22.8 points and 15.4 rebounds, he was an all-state selection and the MVP of the tournament for the third year in a row. Several college coaches regarded him the best big man in the nation, and in his 3 years of varsity basketball at Bryan High School he won 3 championships in a row.

His successful senior season earned him a selection as a McDonald's All-American. In the 1978 McDonald's game, which was played in Philadelphia, he scored 13 points, shooting 5/15 from the field (3/5 from the free throw line), and recorded 16 rebounds in 23 minutes of play, being named the game MVP. He also played in another high school all-star game, the Capital Classic, where he scored 16 points (7/9 shooting, 2/3 on free throws).

== College career ==
Woods was heavily recruited during his high school career, and received interest from Texas A&M, Michigan, USC, Kentucky, Hawaii, North Carolina and LSU. He finally signed with Texas A&M in April 1978, choosing to wear number 23.

Woods immediately made an impact at Texas A&M, and his freshman season was arguably his best one: he averaged 13.9 points and 8.7 rebounds while playing 28.2 minutes per game, he shot .622 from the field (Texas A&M record for a single season at the time), and led the team in rebounds and blocks (2.0). He recorded a career-high 17 rebounds against SMU on January 13, 1979. At the end of the season he was named in the All-SWC first team, he was NABC All-District, All-Defense team, and received the SWC Freshman of the Year award. That year he also played for Team USA at the 1979 Summer Universiade, winning the gold medal.

During his sophomore year at Texas A&M coach Shelby Metcalf increased his minutes, but Woods' averages slightly decreased to 11 points and 7.6 rebounds per game: he played 34 games that season, again leading the team in rebounding and blocked shots. He scored a career-high 31 points on January 28, 1980, against Houston. He was named in the NABC All-District team and in the conference All-Defense team. Since Texas A&M won the SWC conference title, they participated in the NCAA Tournament, where they were eliminated by Louisville in the Midwest Regional semifinals.

Woods' junior year was his worst during his tenure at Texas A&M: he only played 13 games, averaging 21.9 minutes, 8.2 points and 5.2 rebounds. His eligibility was on the line due to poor academic performance and missed classes, and this ended his season early. He had to attend a junior college for two semesters in order to improve his grades and be able to go back to Texas A&M. Woods was eligible again for his senior year, and he returned to be a key player for his team: he played 31 games and averaged 10.8 points, 7.8 rebounds and a team-high 1.5 blocks in 26.8 minutes per game.

He finished his career as the Aggies all-time blocks leader with 192 (his record has since been surpassed by Winston Crite with 200), he was the holder of the best field goal percentage for a career with .584 (since surpassed by Tyler Davis and Kourtney Roberson), he is 16th all-time in scoring with 1,272 points and 5th in rebounding with 853. During his time at Texas A&M he was part of "The Wall", a group of players noted for their defensive prowess, along with David Britton, Claude Riley, Vernon Smith and Rynn Wright.

=== College statistics ===
Year	Team	GP	GS	MPG	FG%	3P%	FT%	RPG	APG	SPG	BPG	PPG
1978–79	Texas A&M	33		28.2	.622	–	.598	8.7	1.1	1.4	2.0	13.9
1979–80	Texas A&M	34		30.6	.589	–	.579	7.6	1.0	0.9	2.0	11.0
1980–81	Texas A&M	13		21.9	.565	–	.455	5.2	0.5	1.0	1.1	8.2
1981–82	Texas A&M	31		26.8	.535	–	.632	7.8	0.7	1.4	1.5	10.8
Career		111		27.8	.584	–	.595	7.7	0.9	1.2	1.7	11.5

== Professional career ==
After his final college season, Woods was automatically eligible for the 1982 NBA draft: the Dallas Mavericks selected him with the 4th pick of the 4th round (73rd overall). However, he did not make the final roster, and chose to sign for Italian team Napoli Basket (named Seleco Napoli for sponsorship reasons). In his first season he scored a total of 703 points and recorded 371 rebounds in 1164 minutes of playing time; he also averaged 3.7 blocks per game. His production decreased the following season, where he scored 511 points and grabbed 306 rebounds in 1063 minutes.

In 1984, Woods came back to the United States and joined the CBA. He initially signed with the Wisconsin Flyers, and in the second part of the season he transferred to the Lancaster Lightning, where he also played during the playoffs, averaging 20.3 points and 8.0 rebounds per game. He played a total of 45 games in the 1984–85 CBA season, averaging 10.5 points, 6.4 rebounds and 1.4 blocks in 24.7 minutes per game.

In 1985, Woods returned to Italy, and played 38 games for AMG Sebastiani Rieti between the 1985–86 and 1986–87 editions of Serie A. He then moved to Spain, where he played the rest of the 1986–87 season in Liga ACB for CB Breogán. He played 15 games in the regular season, averaging 19.5 points and 8.8 rebounds in 34.9 minutes per game. He also played 4 playoffs games, recording averages of 25.5 points and 6.3 rebounds.

== Personal life ==
Rudy Woods was the fifth child of Lemon Woods Sr. and his wife Ruthie: his parents had 8 children. After his retirement from professional basketball, he worked as a truck driver, as a police officer in Denver, Colorado, and as a correctional officer in his native town of Bryan, Texas. Rudy has a son, Rudy Woods Jr. from a first marriage. In 1986, he married Vanita L. Williams, and they had one son, Samuel Alexander Woods (Aka: Samuel Warren). They divorced in 1991. He married Diane in December 1997, he was the father of 4 step-children. During his career abroad, he learned five languages; he died of complications related to diabetes, an illness he had been fighting for several years.
