= Buzz Williams =

American basketball coach (born 1972)

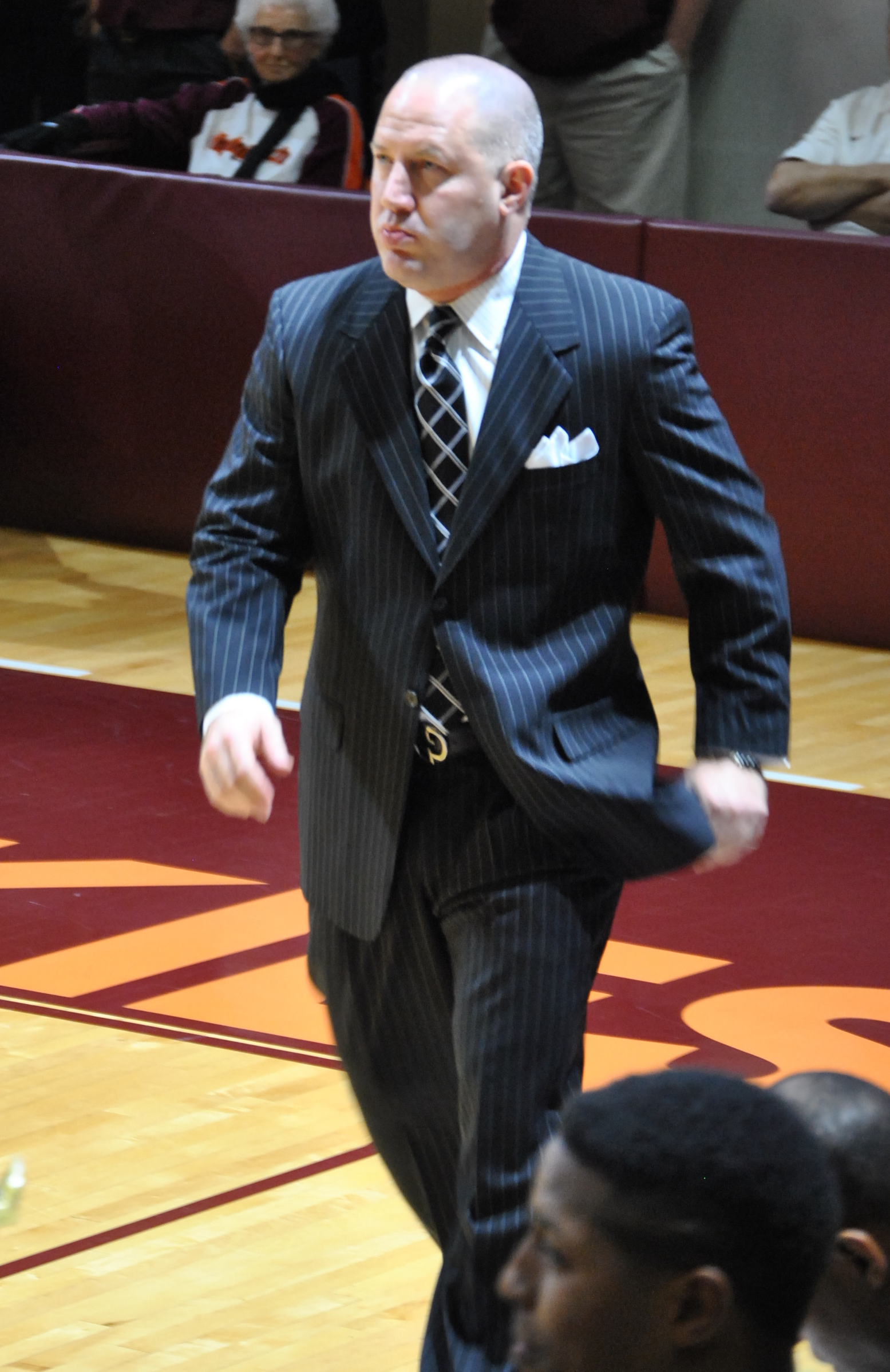

Current position
- Title: Head coach
- Team: Maryland
- Conference: Big Ten
- Record: 14–23 (.378)
- Annual salary: $4,800,000

Biographical details
- Born: September 1, 1972 (age 54); Greenville, Texas, U.S.
- Education: Oklahoma City ('94); Texas A&M–Kingsville ('99)

Coaching career (HC unless noted)
- 1994–1998: Texas–Arlington (assistant)
- 1998–1999: Texas A&M–Kingsville (assistant)
- 1999–2000: Northwestern State (assistant)
- 2000–2004: Colorado State (assistant)
- 2004–2006: Texas A&M (assistant)
- 2006–2007: New Orleans
- 2007–2008: Marquette (assistant)
- 2008–2014: Marquette
- 2014–2019: Virginia Tech
- 2019–2025: Texas A&M
- 2025–present: Maryland

Head coaching record
- Overall: 387–251 (.607)
- Tournaments: 12–11 (NCAA Division I); 5–2 (NIT)

Accomplishments and honors

Championships
- Big East regular season (2013)

Awards
- 2× SEC Coach of the Year (2020, 2023)

Brent Langdon "Buzz" Williams (born September 1, 1972) is an American basketball coach who is the head coach at the University of Maryland. He previously served as head coach at Texas A&M from 2019 to 2025, Virginia Tech from 2014 to 2019, Marquette from 2008 to 2014, and New Orleans during the 2006–07 season, and as an assistant coach at Texas-Arlington, Texas A&M–Kingsville, Northwestern State, Colorado State, and Texas A&M.

Williams has been known to bring struggling and mid-tier programs to new heights throughout his career. He has also garnered a reputation for never staying at a program for more than six seasons. He coached at Marquette for six seasons, Virginia Tech for five, and Texas A&M for six.

== Background and personal life ==
Brent Langdon Williams grew up in Van Alstyne, Texas. He earned a bachelor's degree in kinesiology from Oklahoma City University in 1994 and a master's degree in the same field at Texas A&M University–Kingsville in 1999. Williams married Corey Norman in 2000. They have two daughters (Addyson and Zera) and two sons (Calvin and Mason). Referring to his boundless energy, his coaches at Navarro College nicknamed him Buzz. He was inducted to the Navarro College athletic hall of fame in 2021.

== Head coaching ==
=== Marquette ===
Williams coached Marquette to a 25–10 record in the 2008–09 season, where they lost to the Missouri Tigers in the second round of the 2009 NCAA tournament. He coached Marquette to a 22–12 record in the 2009–10 season, which ended with a close loss to the 11th-seeded Washington Huskies in the first round of the 2010 NCAA tournament.

During the 2010–11 campaign, Williams led the Golden Eagles back to the Sweet Sixteen for the first time since 2003. His team went 22–15 including a 9–9 Big East Conference record. They lost in the quarterfinals of the 2011 Big East men's basketball tournament to Louisville. Marquette received an at-large bid in the 2011 NCAA tournament. There they defeated Xavier in the second round (formerly the first round) and Syracuse in the third round to advance to the Sweet Sixteen. In the Sweet Sixteen, they were defeated by No. 7-ranked and No. 2-seeded North Carolina.

Williams' 2012 team returned to the NCAA tournament after finishing second in the Big East regular season, finishing 14–4 in conference play. As a No. 3 seed in the NCAA Tournament, they defeated BYU and Murray State to advance to their second straight Sweet Sixteen. There, they lost to No. 7-seeded Florida.

After winning a share of the Big East Men's regular season championship, Marquette received an at-large bid in the 2013 NCAA tournament as a No. 3 seed. There, they earned come-from-behind victories over Davidson in the second round and Butler in the third round. In the Sweet Sixteen, the school's third straight under Williams, they defeated ACC regular season and conference champion Miami to earn a trip to Williams's first Elite Eight, where they lost to Syracuse.

The 2013–14 season was Williams' worst at Marquette, finishing 17–15 with a loss to Xavier in the Big East tournament.

=== Virginia Tech ===
Williams was named the head basketball coach at Virginia Tech on March 21, 2014, replacing James Johnson. The move had critics questioning why he would leave Marquette for Virginia Tech, "one of the country’s toughest rebuilding projects." Williams left behind a program at Marquette, which had only nine scholarship players – none taller than 6'7" – for new coach Steve Wojciechowski.

In Williams' first season, the Hokies finished 15th in the ACC with a 2–16 conference record, matching the lowest ACC win total in Virginia Tech history. However, with several true freshmen playing a significant number of minutes, a young nucleus was established. Expectations grew further when Williams landed commitments from Maryland transfer Seth Allen, and Zach LeDay from South Florida. Both became eligible in the 2015–16 season. After a slow start to the season, the team quickly improved. On January 4, 2016, the Hokies defeated their in-state rival and 4th ranked Virginia at home, marking Williams' biggest win at Virginia Tech to date. The team had continued success in the ACC, ending the regular season with another upset of a top-10 rival, this time 7th ranked Miami. Williams' Hokies finished the regular season at 10–8 in ACC conference play; an improvement of eight wins from the previous year. The Hokies would receive an invite to the 2016 NIT where they advanced to the second round before losing to BYU.

On July 13, 2016, Virginia Tech and Williams agreed to a contract extension through the 2022–23 season. At the same press conference, Williams also announced his establishment of a new endowment and scholarship for the university. The Buzz’s Bunch Scholarship Endowment will be awarded annually to an undergraduate student at Virginia Tech in any field of study who is registered at the school with a disability. Also, "The Buzz and Corey Williams Family Student-Athlete Scholarship – In Memory of T. Marshall Hahn" will be awarded annually to an undergraduate female student-athlete at Virginia Tech.

The Hokies began the 2016–17 season with an 11–1 non-conference record and won their first ACC conference game against No. 5 Duke in Cassell Coliseum on December 31, 2016. On January 29, 2017, Williams earned his 200th career win as a head coach with a win against Boston College in Blacksburg. After going 5–6 in their first 11 ACC games, the Hokies defeated No. 12 Virginia in double overtime, marking Williams' fourth victory over a top-15 team in the past two years. The Hokies parlayed their success with a trip to the NCAA tournament for the first time since 2007. As the No. 9 seed, they lost in the first round to Wisconsin.

The 2017–18 team had similar success, finishing the regular season with a 21–11 record and a 10–8 ACC record. Williams led the Hokies to their second consecutive NCAA tournament berth but lost in the first round to Alabama.

The 2018–19 team entered the top 10 for the first time since the 1995–96 season. Before the season started, freshman Landers Nolley (Top 100 recruit, 2017-2018 Georgia Player of the Year) was deemed ineligible due to his ACT score being suspiciously high, casting doubt on its validity despite his high school coach describing Nolley as an "Ivy League-type guy". ESPN's Jay Bilas tweeted that this was "another example of why the NCAA should get out of the eligibility business. It's just wrong". In addition, senior leader Chris Clarke was indefinitely suspended prior to the start of the season. During conference play, Justin Robinson sustained a toe injury that kept him out of over half of the Hokies' conference games. Despite these major setbacks, Williams led the Hokies to a 23–7 regular season with 12 wins in the ACC, the most in program history. In addition, Virginia Tech received the fourth seed in the east bracket of the 2019 NCAA Division I men's basketball tournament, tied for the highest seed in program history. After the Hokies defeated Saint Louis University in the first round and Liberty University in the second round, Williams earned a bid to the Sweet 16, the program's first bid since 1967. In their Sweet 16 matchup the Hokies faced ACC rival Duke, a team they defeated earlier in the season. Duke prevailed over Virginia Tech after a missed last second shot by senior Ahmed Hill.

=== Texas A&M ===
On April 3, 2019, it was announced that Williams would be leaving Virginia Tech to take the same position at Texas A&M.

In his first season, Williams took the Aggies to a 16–14 (10–8 SEC) record, and earned SEC Coach of the Year honors by the Associated Press with a strong finish to the regular season. As the team was about to tip off against Missouri in the SEC Tournament, the season was abruptly ended by the start of the COVID-19 pandemic. The team was known for Williams's trademark defense, but the transition to a new offensive scheme proved difficult, culminating in an average margin of victory just slightly over 8 points by season's end.

The next year A&M had a promising season marred by the ongoing COVID-19 pandemic and canceled a majority of their games on their way to an 8–10 (2–8 SEC) record.

In his third year as coach, the team found some success and went 20–11 (9–9 SEC) in the regular season. The team also fought all the way to the SEC championship game in the SEC tournament, defeating #4 Auburn and #15 Arkansas along the way before dropping the title game to #9 Tennessee. Though expected by many to make the NCAA Tournament, an 8 game losing streak in the regular season was the deciding factor against their entry. Earning a top seed in the NIT, Williams led the Aggies to the championship game in Madison Square Garden before falling to Xavier, finishing with a final record of 27–13 (9–9 SEC).

Williams's fourth year was a roller coaster of sorts, but was nonetheless successful. Ranked in the Top 25 early in the season, out of conference losses to Murray State and Wofford within the first few weeks led to some early doubters. The team would turn it around, however, finishing the regular season with victory over #2 Alabama and a 23–8 overall record, 15–3 in conference, the most conference wins in Texas A&M history. The successful turnaround earned Williams his 2nd SEC Coach of the Year award in 4 years. The team's won 7 of 8 at the end of the season and into the SEC tournament before falling in the championship game to Alabama. Likely due to their early-season losses, A&M was given a 7-seed in the NCAA Tournament, despite being ranked 17th in the Top 25. This led to a difficult match-up against a hot Penn State team, who defeated the Aggies in the first round 76–59.

For the 2023–24 team, Williams led the Aggies through another roller coaster season. Ranked as high as #12 before conference play, the team then proceeded to go on hot and cold streaks throughout the regular season, finishing with an overall record of 18–13 (9–9 SEC). Winning their way to the SEC tournament semifinals, including defeating #9 Kentucky, they earned an at-large bid into the NCAA Tournament as a 9-seed. The team defeated Nebraska in the first round before falling to #2 ranked Houston in overtime, concluding their season with a 21–15 record.

The 2024–25 team maintained a presence within the Top 25 all season long, culminating in a regular season final record of 22–9 (11–7 SEC). An early loss to Texas in the SEC tournament led to the team earning a 4 seed in the NCAA Tournament, where they would go on to defeat Yale in the first round, but fall to Big Ten tournament winner Michigan in the second round, ending the season with a record of 23–11.

=== Maryland ===
On April 1, 2025, Williams accepted an offer to become the head coach at Maryland. The Contract is worth a total guaranteed income of $30.3 million for 6 years, not including moving expenses ($75,000), monthly car allowance ($2,400) and monthly cell phone ($120).

== Head coaching record ==
Record table
Season	Team	Overall	Conference	Standing	Postseason
New Orleans Privateers (Sun Belt Conference) (2006–2007)
2006–07	New Orleans	14–17	9–9	4th (West)	
New Orleans:		14–17 (.452)	9–9 (.500)		
Marquette Golden Eagles (Big East Conference) (2008–2014)
2008–09	Marquette	25–10	12–6	5th	NCAA Division I Round of 32
2009–10	Marquette	22–12	11–7	5th	NCAA Division I Round of 64
2010–11	Marquette	22–15	9–9	T–9th	NCAA Division I Sweet 16
2011–12	Marquette	27–8	14–4	2nd	NCAA Division I Sweet 16
2012–13	Marquette	26–9	14–4	T–1st	NCAA Division I Elite Eight
2013–14	Marquette	17–15	9–9	6th	
Marquette:		139–69 (.668)	69–39 (.639)		
Virginia Tech Hokies (Atlantic Coast Conference) (2014–2019)
2014–15	Virginia Tech	11–22	2–16	15th	
2015–16	Virginia Tech	20–15	10–8	T–7th	NIT Second Round
2016–17	Virginia Tech	22–11	10–8	T–7th	NCAA Division I Round of 64
2017–18	Virginia Tech	21–12	10–8	7th	NCAA Division I Round of 64
2018–19	Virginia Tech	26–9	12–6	5th	NCAA Division I Sweet 16
Virginia Tech:		100–69 (.592)	44–46 (.489)		
Texas A&M Aggies (Southeastern Conference) (2019–2025)
2019–20	Texas A&M	16–14	10–8	T–6th	
2020–21	Texas A&M	8–10	2–8	14th	
2021–22	Texas A&M	27–13	9–9	T–5th	NIT Runner-up
2022–23	Texas A&M	25–10	15–3	2nd	NCAA Division I Round of 64
2023–24	Texas A&M	21–15	9–9	T–7th	NCAA Division I Round of 32
2024–25	Texas A&M	23–11	11–7	5th	NCAA Division I Round of 32
Texas A&M:		120–73 (.622)	56–44 (.560)		
Maryland Terrapins (Big Ten Conference) (2025–present)
2025–26	Maryland	12–21	4–16	17th	
2026–27	Maryland	2–2	0–0		
Maryland:		14–23 (.378)	4–16 (.200)		
Total:		387–251 (.607)			
National champion Postseason invitational champion Conference regular season champion Conference regular season and conference tournament champion Division regular season champion Division regular season and conference tournament champion Conference tournament champion
