= Ronnie Peret =

American basketball player (born 1947)

Personal information
- Born: 1947 (age 78–79) Plainview, Texas, U.S.
- Listed height: 6 ft 8 in (2.03 m)
- Listed weight: 230 lb (104 kg)

Career information
- High school: Plainview (Plainview, Texas)
- College: Texas A&M (1966–1969)
- NBA draft: 1969: 11th round, 153rd overall pick
- Drafted by: Los Angeles Lakers
- Position: Center

Career highlights
- SWC co-Player of the Year (1969); 2× First-team All-SWC (1968, 1969)
- Stats at Basketball Reference

Ronnie M. Peret (born 1947) is an American former basketball player known for his college career at Texas A&M University from 1966 to 1969. He was the Southwest Conference co-Player of the Year as a senior in 1969.

== Playing career ==
A native of Plainview, Texas, Peret was a standout basketball player at Plainview High School. When deciding upon which college to attend, he chose Texas A&M due to insistence by his parents and grandmother. When he arrived in the fall of 1965, he had to play for the school's freshman team because then-NCAA rules prohibited freshmen from competing at the varsity level. When Peret finally suited up for the Aggies as a sophomore in 1966, he led a program in which led them in rebounding all three seasons, scoring in his final two seasons, and culminated his career by leading them to the school's first-ever Sweet 16 appearance in the 1969 NCAA University Division basketball tournament. Peret was named to the All-Southwest Conference First Team in both his junior and senior years, and was named the SWC co-Player of the Year as a senior.

In 2011, Peret was inducted into Texas A&M's athletics hall of fame.

== Later life ==
Despite being selected in the 1969 NBA draft by the Los Angeles Lakers in the 11th round (153rd overall) as well as the 1969 ABA draft by the Indiana Pacers, Peret never competed in either league. He experienced a hernia-related medical issue, causing teams to cut him before his rookie season began. Peret instead chose to pursue a career in insurance, an industry he has stayed in his entire professional career as of December 2022.
