= Vernon Smith (basketball) =

American basketball player (1958–1992)

- Smith with the Texas A&M Aggies

Personal information
- Born: October 23, 1958 Dallas, Texas, U.S.
- Died: July 7, 1992 (aged 33) Dallas, Texas, U.S.
- Listed height: 6 ft 8 in (2.03 m)
- Listed weight: 220 lb (100 kg)

Career information
- High school: David W. Carter (Dallas, Texas)
- College: Texas A&M (1977–1981)
- NBA draft: 1981: 2nd round, 46th overall pick
- Drafted by: Philadelphia 76ers
- Playing career: 1982–1987
- Position: Power forward

Career history
- 1982–1983: Las Vegas Silvers
- 1983: Albany Patroons
- 1983: Wisconsin Flyers
- 1983–1984: Pallacanestro Vigevano
- 1984–1985: Corona Cremona
- 1985–1986: RCD Espanyol
- 1986–1987: CEB Llíria

Career highlights
- 3× First-team All-SWC (1979–1981); Second-team All-SWC (1978)
- Stats at Basketball Reference

Vernon Dean Smith (October 23, 1958 – July 7, 1992) was an American professional basketball player. After playing for the Texas A&M Aggies, he was drafted into the NBA by the Philadelphia 76ers in the 1981 draft. He was signed, but never played, for multiple NBA teams before traveling internationally to play basketball in Europe.

== Early life ==
Smith was born on 23 October 1958 in Dallas, Texas. He graduated from David W. Carter High School in 1977.

== Career ==
Smith played college basketball for the Texas A&M Aggies, where he was an All-SWC selection every season he played. Smith ranks second in total points scored for the Aggies. (Note: Smith held the record for total points scored until he was surpassed by Bernard King in 2003.)

Smith was selected by the Philadelphia 76ers as the 46th overall pick in the 1981 NBA draft but never played in the National Basketball Association (NBA). Instead, Smith spent one season with multiple teams in the Continental Basketball Association (CBA) before playing in Italy and Spain. In February 1982, Smith signed a 10-day contract with the Detroit Pistons but never played with the team. In October 1982, Smith was signed by the Indiana Pacers but was released later that month before the start of the 1982–83 NBA season.

After playing his final season in 1986–87 with CEB Llíria, Smith returned to his hometown of Dallas, Texas. He worked as a clerk at Sears and was a church organist.

== Death ==
Smith was fatally shot in a case of mistaken identity. He had been sitting in his car outside an Oak Cliff apartment block when a man, who had argued with a dice game opponent moments earlier, approached Smith and shot him.

Smith was inducted to the Texas A&M Athletic Hall of Fame in 2008.

== Career statistics ==
Legend
GP	Games played	GS	Games started	MPG	Minutes per game
FG%	Field goal percentage	3P%	3-point field goal percentage	FT%	Free throw percentage
RPG	Rebounds per game	APG	Assists per game	SPG	Steals per game
BPG	Blocks per game	PPG	Points per game	**Bold**	Career high

=== College ===
Year	Team	GP	GS	MPG	FG%	3P%	FT%	RPG	APG	SPG	BPG	PPG
1977–78	Texas A&M	27	–	28.4	.469	–	.609	8.4	.9	.6	**.4**	14.0
1978–79	Texas A&M	**33**	–	**35.5**	**.479**	–	.698	8.2	**2.3**	**1.2**	**.4**	**16.0**
1979–80	Texas A&M	32	–	34.5	.472	–	**.744**	7.5	1.3	.5	**.4**	14.8
1980–81	Texas A&M	27	–	34.4	.448	–	.729	**9.0**	2.1	.8	**.4**	14.8
Career		119	–	33.4	.468	–	.699	8.2	1.7	.8	.4	14.9
