= Wade Taylor IV =

American basketball player (born 2003)

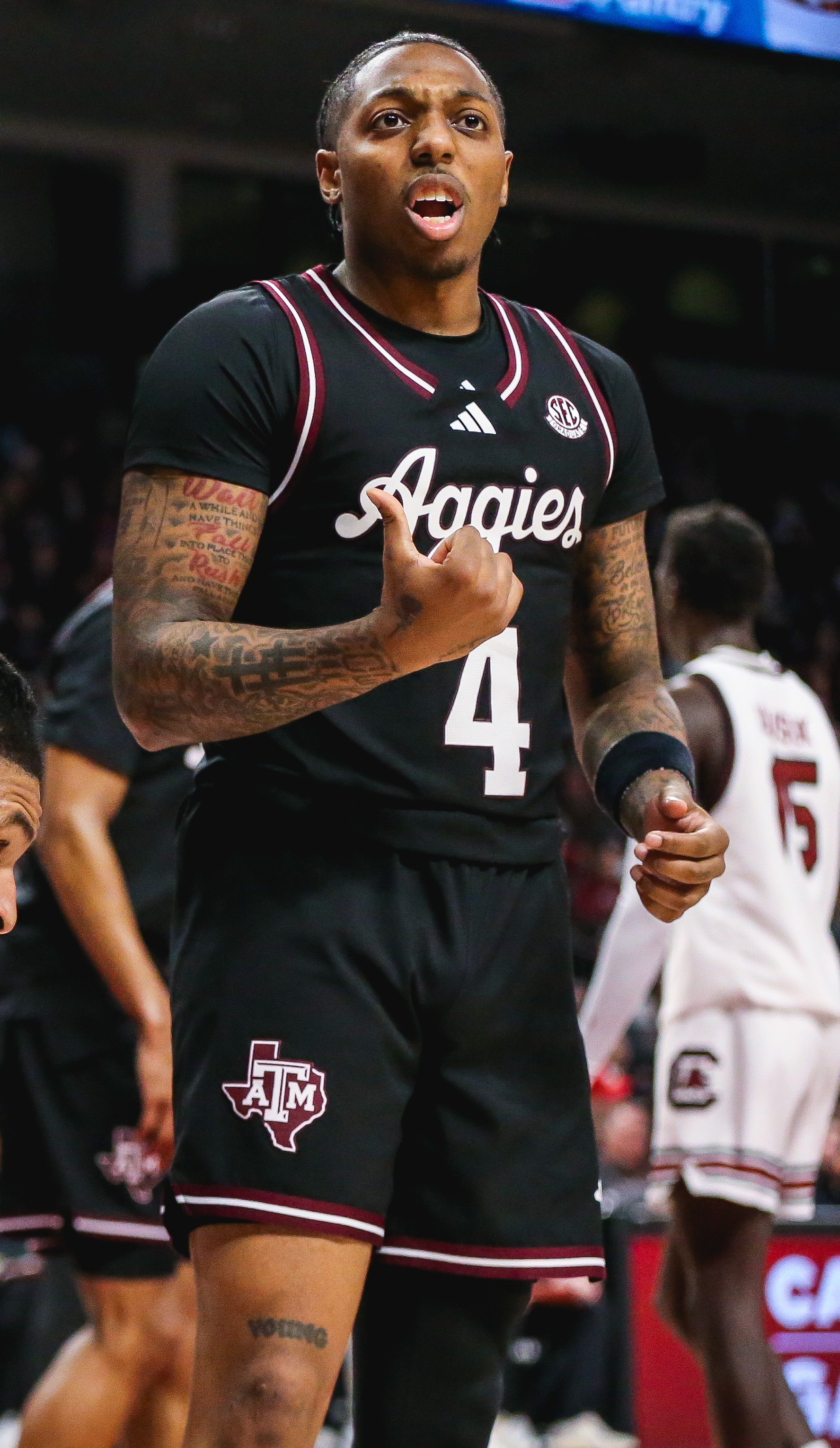
- Taylor with Texas A&M

No. 4 – Noblesville Boom
- Position: Point guard
- League: NBA G League

Personal information
- Born: June 5, 2003 (age 23) Dallas, Texas, U.S.
- Listed height: 6 ft 0 in (1.83 m)
- Listed weight: 180 lb (82 kg)

Career information
- High school: Lancaster (Lancaster, Texas)
- College: Texas A&M (2021–2025)
- NBA draft: 2025: undrafted
- Playing career: 2025–present

Career history
- 2025–2026: Mexico City Capitanes
- 2026–present: Noblesville Boom

Career highlights
- Honorable mention All-American – AP (2023); 3× First-team All-SEC (2023–2025); No. 4 honored by Texas A&M Aggies
- Stats at Basketball Reference

Wade Taylor IV (born June 5, 2003) is an American professional basketball player for the Noblesville Boom of the NBA G League. He played college basketball for Texas A&M Aggies.

== Early life and high school career ==
Taylor grew up in Dallas, Texas and attended Lancaster High School. He averaged 15.7 points, 4.3 assists, and 3.3 steals per game as a junior. Taylor was rated a four-star recruit and committed to playing college basketball for Texas A&M over offers from Iowa State, SMU, Virginia Tech, and Oklahoma State.

== College career ==
Taylor played in all 40 of Texas A&M's games during his freshman season and averaged 8.2 points, 2.2 assists, and 1.8 rebounds per game. As a sophomore, he was named first-team All-Southeastern Conference (SEC) and was an honorable mention All-American selection by the Associated Press. Taylor was named to the 2023 SEC men's basketball tournament All-Tournament team after averaging 18.7 points and 3.3 assists over three games as the Aggies went to the final before losing to Alabama. As a sophomore, he averaged 16.3 points, 3.9 assists, and 1.7 steals per game. On October 17, 2023, Taylor was named SEC Preseason Player of the Year for the 2023–24 season.

== Professional career ==
After going undrafted in the 2025 NBA draft, Taylor joined the Mexico City Capitanes.

On September 14, 2026, Taylor signed an Exhibit 10 contract with the Indiana Pacers. However, he was waived by Indiana the following day.

== Career statistics ==
Legend
GP	Games played	GS	Games started	MPG	Minutes per game
FG%	Field goal percentage	3P%	3-point field goal percentage	FT%	Free throw percentage
RPG	Rebounds per game	APG	Assists per game	SPG	Steals per game
BPG	Blocks per game	PPG	Points per game	**Bold**	Career high

=== College ===
Year	Team	GP	GS	MPG	FG%	3P%	FT%	RPG	APG	SPG	BPG	PPG
2021–22	Texas A&M	**40**	14	17.5	.341	.278	.777	1.8	2.2	1.2	**.1**	8.2
2022–23	Texas A&M	35	33	28.7	**.396**	**.356**	**.878**	2.7	3.9	1.7	**.1**	16.3
2023–24	Texas A&M	36	**36**	**32.9**	.366	.325	.847	**3.5**	4.0	**1.8**	.0	**19.1**
2024–25	Texas A&M	30	30	30.5	.354	.318	.866	3.0	**4.3**	1.3	.1	15.7
Career		141	113	27.0	.366	.323	.851	2.7	3.5	1.5	.1	14.6
