= Alex Caruso =

American basketball player (born 1994)

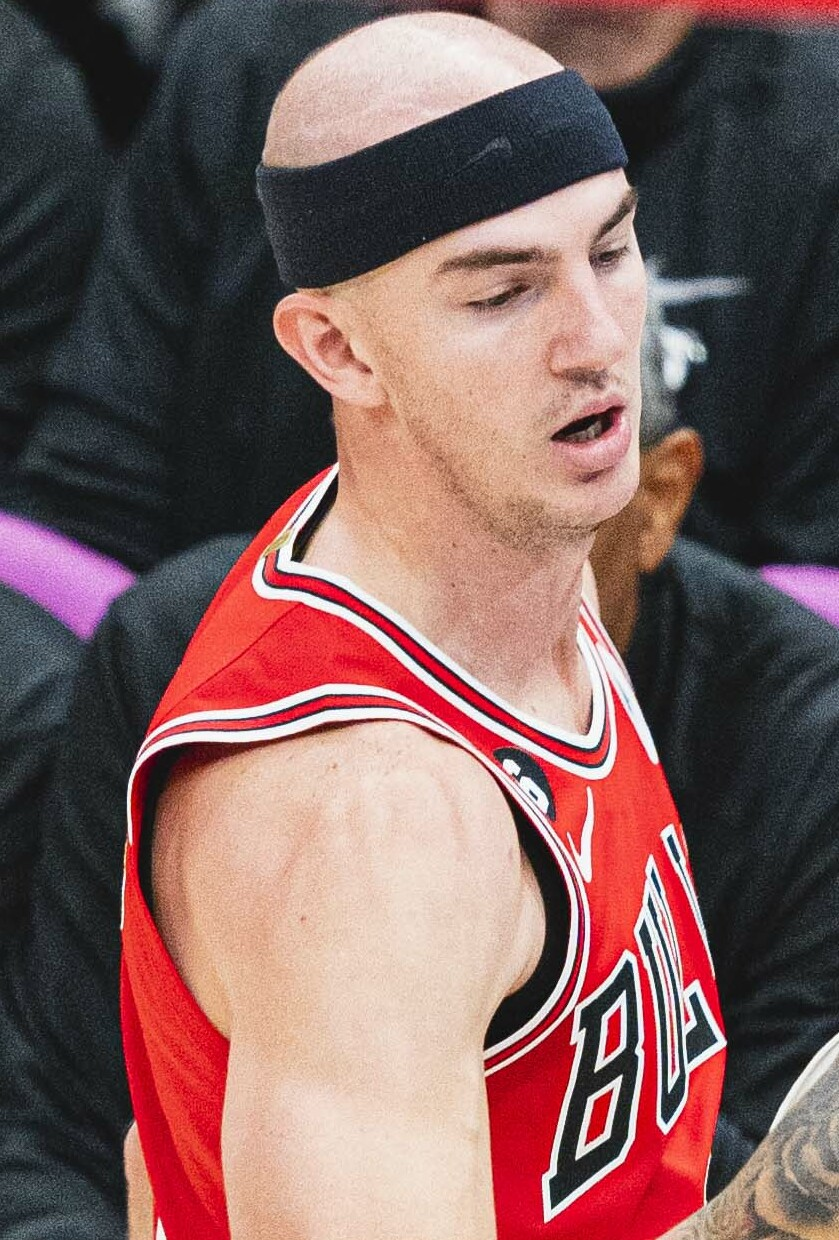
- Caruso with the Chicago Bulls in 2022

No. 9 – Oklahoma City Thunder
- Position: Shooting guard
- League: NBA

Personal information
- Born: February 28, 1994 (age 32) College Station, Texas, U.S.
- Listed height: 6 ft 5 in (1.96 m)
- Listed weight: 186 lb (84 kg)

Career information
- High school: A&M Consolidated (College Station, Texas)
- College: Texas A&M (2012–2016)
- NBA draft: 2016: undrafted
- Playing career: 2016–present

Career history
- 2016–2017: Oklahoma City Blue
- 2017–2021: Los Angeles Lakers
- 2017–2019: →South Bay Lakers
- 2021–2024: Chicago Bulls
- 2024–present: Oklahoma City Thunder

Career highlights
- 2× NBA champion (2020, 2025); NBA All-Defensive First Team (2023); NBA All-Defensive Second Team (2024); Second-team All-NBA G League (2018); Second-team All-SEC (2016); SEC All-Defensive Team (2015)
- Stats at NBA.com
- Stats at Basketball Reference

Alex Michael Caruso (born February 28, 1994) is an American professional basketball player for the Oklahoma City Thunder of the National Basketball Association (NBA). He played college basketball for the Texas A&M Aggies, earning second-team all-Southeastern Conference (SEC) honors as a senior in 2016. He is a two-time NBA champion, winning titles with the Lakers in 2020 and the Thunder in 2025. He earned two consecutive All-Defensive Team selections as a member of the Chicago Bulls in 2023 and 2024.

== Early life ==
Caruso attended A&M Consolidated High School in his native College Station, Texas, where he played basketball under head coaches Rusty Segler and Rick German. As a senior, he averaged 18 points and 9 rebounds and was named TABC All-Regional, All-State as well as TABC All-Star and district MVP after leading his team to the postseason.

== College career ==
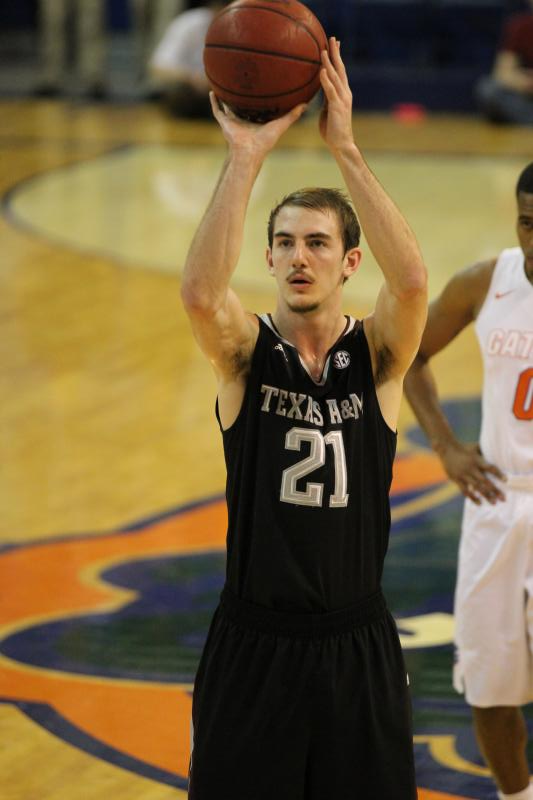
Caruso shooting a free throw in 2015

After graduating from high school, Caruso joined the Texas A&M Aggies. In 137 games over his four-year career, he averaged 8.0 points, 4.7 assists and 2.02 steals per game, finishing as the school's all-time leader in assists with 649 and steals with 276, surpassing David Edwards in those categories. As a senior he led the Aggies to the Sweet 16 of the NCAA Tournament; he also earned SEC All-Defensive Team and second-team All-SEC honors. He graduated with a Bachelor of Arts degree in sports management.

== Professional career ==
=== Oklahoma City Blue (2016–2017) ===
After going undrafted in the 2016 NBA draft, Caruso joined the Philadelphia 76ers for the 2016 NBA Summer League. On September 23, 2016, he signed with the Oklahoma City Thunder, but was later waived on October 17. On November 3, he was acquired by the Oklahoma City Blue of the NBA Development League.

=== Los Angeles Lakers (2017–2021) ===
Caruso joined the Lakers for the 2017 NBA Summer League. After several productive games, including one in which Caruso started in place of the injured Lonzo Ball and led the Lakers to a victory, he was signed to the Lakers' first two-way contract on July 13, 2017. He became the first player to go directly from the D-League (now G League) to the NBA via two-way contract. He also helped lead the Lakers win the 2017 NBA Summer League Championship in Las Vegas. Caruso made his NBA debut on October 19, 2017, against the Los Angeles Clippers. He played 12 minutes and recorded two points, two assists, and one rebound in a 108–92 loss. He had a career-high 15 points and seven rebounds in a victory in the final game of the season against the Clippers.

Caruso signed another two-way contract with the Los Angeles Lakers after a successful showing in the 2018 NBA Summer League. On March 6, 2019, he recorded a season-high 15 points, six rebounds, and three assists in a 99–115 loss to the Denver Nuggets. He scored a new career-high 32 points in a 122–117 victory over the Clippers on April 5. He also became the only Laker that season other than LeBron James to record a 30+ point, 10+ rebound, 5+ assist game. On April 7, 2019, with the Lakers missing James for the remaining six games, Caruso scored 18 points with a career-high 11 assists in a 113–109 home win over the Utah Jazz.

On July 6, 2019, Caruso signed a two-year contract with the Lakers worth $5.5 million. He won his first NBA championship with them on October 11, 2020, when the Lakers defeated the Miami Heat in six games. Caruso started the clinching game of the NBA Finals. He became an unrestricted free agent after the 2020–21 season.

=== Chicago Bulls (2021–2024) ===
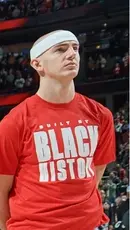
Caruso in 2023

On August 10, 2021, Caruso signed a four-year, $37 million contract with the Chicago Bulls. Caruso chose to wear number 6 with the Bulls as his usual number 4 had been retired by the team in honor of Jerry Sloan.

On January 21, 2022, during a 90–94 loss to the Milwaukee Bucks, Caruso was fouled by opposing guard Grayson Allen. Allen was ejected from the game. The next day, the Bulls announced that Caruso had a fractured right wrist and would undergo surgery, keeping him out for at least 6-to-8 weeks.

At the end of the 2023 season, Caruso was named for the first time to the NBA All-Defensive First Team.

On October 27, 2023, Caruso put up 13 points, 13 rebounds, two assists, two steals, and one block alongside a game-winning three-pointer in a 104–103 overtime win over the Toronto Raptors. He won the NBA Hustle Award in 2023–24.

=== Oklahoma City Thunder (2024–present) ===
On June 21, 2024, Caruso was traded to the Oklahoma City Thunder in exchange for Josh Giddey. The move reunited Caruso with Mark Daigneault, who coached him during his tenure with the Oklahoma City Blue. On December 22, Caruso and the Thunder agreed to a four–year, $81 million contract extension. In his first season with the team, Caruso earned his second-career NBA championship after winning the 2025 NBA Finals in seven games over the Indiana Pacers. He was a key player off the bench during the Finals, scoring 20 points in both Game 2 and Game 4 — both wins for the Thunder — before finishing the Finals averaging 10.1 points and 3.6 rebounds.

Caruso made 56 appearances for Oklahoma City as a reserve during the 2025–26 season, logging averages of 6.2 points, 2.8 rebounds, and 2.0 assists. In Game 1 of the Western Conference Finals against the San Antonio Spurs, Caruso recorded a team–high 31 points as the Thunder lost, 122–115.

== Career statistics ==
Legend
GP	Games played	GS	Games started	MPG	Minutes per game
FG%	Field goal percentage	3P%	3-point field goal percentage	FT%	Free throw percentage
RPG	Rebounds per game	APG	Assists per game	SPG	Steals per game
BPG	Blocks per game	PPG	Points per game	**Bold**	Career high
†	Won an NBA championship	*	Led the league

=== NBA ===
==== Regular season ====
Year	Team	GP	GS	MPG	FG%	3P%	FT%	RPG	APG	SPG	BPG	PPG
2017–18	L.A. Lakers	37	7	15.2	.431	.302	.700	1.8	2.0	.6	.3	3.6
2018–19	L.A. Lakers	25	4	21.2	.445	**.480**	.797	2.7	3.1	1.0	.4	9.2
2019–20†	L.A. Lakers	64	2	18.4	.412	.333	.737	1.9	1.9	1.1	.3	5.5
2020–21	L.A. Lakers	58	6	21.0	.436	.401	.645	2.9	2.8	1.1	.3	6.4
2021–22	Chicago	41	18	28.0	.398	.333	.795	3.6	**4.0**	**1.7**	.4	7.4
2022–23	Chicago	67	36	23.5	.455	.364	.808	2.9	2.9	1.5	.7	5.6
2023–24	Chicago	**71**	**57**	**28.7**	**.468**	.408	.760	**3.8**	3.5	**1.7**	**1.0**	**10.1**
2024–25†	Oklahoma City	54	3	19.3	.446	.353	**.824**	2.9	2.5	1.6	.6	7.1
2025–26	Oklahoma City	56	0	18.2	.423	.293	.804	2.8	2.0	1.3	.3	6.2
Career		473	133	21.8	.438	.365	.762	2.9	2.7	1.3	.5	6.8

==== Playoffs ====
Year	Team	GP	GS	MPG	FG%	3P%	FT%	RPG	APG	SPG	BPG	PPG
2020†	L.A. Lakers	21	1	24.3	.425	.279	.800	2.3	2.8	1.1	.6	6.5
2021	L.A. Lakers	6	0	20.2	.368	.294	**1.000**	1.3	.5	.2	.7	5.8
2022	Chicago	4	**4**	**28.3**	.391	.389	–	2.8	**4.3**	1.3	**1.0**	6.3
2025†	Oklahoma City	**23***	0	24.4	.450	.411	.795	2.7	2.2	**2.0**	.6	9.2
2026	Oklahoma City	15	0	23.5	**.478**	**.446**	.815	**3.0**	2.1	1.4	.5	**11.0**
Career		69	5	24.0	.441	.381	.806	2.5	2.3	1.4	.6	8.3

=== College ===
Year	Team	GP	GS	MPG	FG%	3P%	FT%	RPG	APG	SPG	BPG	PPG
2012–13	Texas A&M	33	17	24.7	.373	.265	.600	3.2	3.4	1.8	.5	5.5
2013–14	Texas A&M	34	33	29.8	.460	.333	.685	3.6	5.0	2.0	**.8**	9.0
2014–15	Texas A&M	33	33	**31.5**	.463	.366	.685	**4.5**	**5.5**	**2.1**	.2	**9.1**
2015–16	Texas A&M	**37**	**37**	28.8	**.502**	**.368**	**.785**	3.6	5.0	**2.1**	.2	8.1
Career		137	120	28.7	.455	.340	.685	3.7	4.7	2.0	.4	8.0

== Personal life ==
Born in the United States, Caruso is of Italian descent. He has two sisters. His father played four years at Creighton and was an associate athletic director at Texas A&M.

Caruso grew up around the A&M program, spending many seasons as a ball boy for the Aggies. While studying at Texas A&M he majored in sports management.

On June 22, 2021, Caruso was arrested at Easterwood Airport in College Station, Texas, for residual marijuana left on a grinder.

In 2022, Caruso began dating former Big Brother contestant Haleigh Broucher. On August 20, 2024, the two announced their engagement. They were married on August 9, 2025 in Houston, Texas.
