= 2022–23 Texas A&M Aggies men's basketball team =

2022–23 Texas A&M Aggies men's basketball

NCAA tournament, First Round
- Conference: Southeastern Conference

Ranking
- Coaches: No. 25
- AP: No. 17
- Record: 25–10 (15–3 SEC)
- Head coach: Buzz Williams (4th season)
- Associate head coach: Devin Johnson
- Assistant coaches: Steve Roccaforte; Lyle Wolf
- Home arena: Reed Arena

2022–23 Southeastern Conference men's basketball standings
	Conf.				Overall
Team	W		L	PCT	W		L	PCT
No. 1 Alabama†	16	–	2	.889	31	–	6	.838
No. 17 Texas A&M	15	–	3	.833	25	–	10	.714
Kentucky	12	–	6	.667	22	–	12	.647
No. 23 Missouri	11	–	7	.611	25	–	10	.714
No. 20 Tennessee	11	–	7	.611	25	–	11	.694
Vanderbilt	11	–	7	.611	22	–	15	.595
Auburn	10	–	8	.556	21	–	13	.618
Florida	9	–	9	.500	16	–	17	.485
Mississippi State	8	–	10	.444	21	–	13	.618
Arkansas	8	–	10	.444	22	–	14	.611
Georgia	6	–	12	.333	16	–	16	.500
South Carolina	4	–	14	.222	11	–	21	.344
Ole Miss	3	–	15	.167	12	–	21	.364
LSU	2	–	16	.111	14	–	19	.424
† 2023 SEC tournament winner Rankings from AP poll

The 2022–23 Texas A&M Aggies men's basketball team represented Texas A&M University during the 2022–23 NCAA Division I men's basketball season. The team were led by fourth-year head coach Buzz Williams and played their home games at Reed Arena in College Station, Texas as a member of the Southeastern Conference. They finished the season 25-10, 15–3 in SEC play to finish in second place. As the No. 2 seed in the SEC tournament, they defeated Arkansas and Vanderbilt to advance to the championship game, where they lost to Alabama. The Aggies received an at-large bid to the NCAA Tournament as a No. 7 seed, where they were defeated in the first round by Penn State.

== Previous season ==
The Aggies finished the 2021–22 season 27–13, 9–9 in SEC play to finish in a five-way tie for fifth place. As the No. 8 seed in the SEC tournament, they defeated Florida, Auburn, and Arkansas to advance to the championship game, where they lost to Tennessee. They received an at-large bid to the National Invitation Tournament as a No. 1 seed. They defeated Alcorn State, Oregon, Wake Forest, and Washington State to advance to the NIT championship game. There, they lost to Xavier.

== Offseason ==
=== Departures ===
Name	Number	Pos.	Height	Weight	Year	Hometown	Reason for departure
Aaron Cash	0	G	6'6"	201	Junior	San Francisco, CA	Transferred to UT Arlington
Marcus Williams	1	G	6'2"	197	Sophomore	Dickinson, TX	Transferred to San Francisco
Quenton Jackson	3	G	6'5"	173	GS senior	Los Angeles, CA	Graduated
Hassan Diarra	5	G	6'2"	196	Sophomore	Queens, NY	Transferred to UConn
Jalen Johnson	11	F	6'6"	210	GS senior	Baton Rouge, LA	Graduated
Everett Vaughn	12	F	6'10"	255	Junior	Bellaire, TX	Walk-on; didn't return
Zach Walker	24	G	6'4"	199	Senior	Deer Park, TX	Graduate transferred to Texas Southern

=== Incoming transfers ===
Name	Number	Pos.	Height	Weight	Year	Hometown	Previous school
Dexter Dennis	0	G	6'5"	210	GS senior	Baker, LA	Wichita State
Khalen Robinson	1	G	6'0"	180	Junior	Little Rock, AR	Arkansas
Erik Pratt	3	G	6'5"	180	Junior	Lake Worth, FL	Seward County CC
Andersson Garcia	11	G/F	6'7"	210	Junior	Moca, DR	Mississippi State
Julius Marble II	34	F	6'8"	245	Senior	Dallas, TX	Michigan State

=== Recruiting classes ===
==== 2022 recruiting class ====
College recruiting
Name	Hometown	School	Height	Weight	Commit date
Solomon Washington #45 SF	New Orleans, LA	G. W. Carver High School	6 ft 6 in (1.98 m)	190 lb (86 kg)	Nov 8, 2021
Solomon Washington #45 SF	Recruit ratings: Scout: Rivals: 247Sports: ESPN: (81)				
Jordan Williams; PG	Houston, TX	Second Baptist	6 ft 3 in (1.91 m)	210 lb (95 kg)	Oct 16, 2020
Jordan Williams; PG	Recruit ratings: Scout: Rivals: 247Sports: ESPN: (NR)				
Overall recruit ranking:
Note: In many cases, Scout, Rivals, 247Sports, On3, and ESPN may conflict in their listings of height and weight.; In these cases, the average was taken. ESPN grades are on a 100-point scale.; Sources: "Texas A&M 2022 Basketball Commitments". Rivals.; "2022 Team Ranking". Rivals.

== Roster ==
2022–23 Texas A&M Aggies men's basketball team
Players
Coaches

Pos.	#	Name	Height	Weight	Year	Previous school	Hometown
G	0	Dexter Dennis	6 ft 5 in (1.96 m)	210 lb (95 kg)	GS	Wichita State	Baker, Louisiana
G	1	Khalen Robinson	6 ft 0 in (1.83 m)	180 lb (82 kg)	Jr	Arkansas	Little Rock, Arkansas
G	2	Hayden Hefner	6 ft 6 in (1.98 m)	185 lb (84 kg)	Jr	Nederland High School	Nederland, Texas
G	3	Erik Pratt	6 ft 5 in (1.96 m)	185 lb (84 kg)	Jr	Seward County Community College	Lake Worth, Florida
G	4	Wade Taylor IV	6 ft 0 in (1.83 m)	185 lb (84 kg)	So	Lancaster High School	Lancaster, Texas
G	5	Jordan Williams	6 ft 3 in (1.91 m)	215 lb (98 kg)	Fr	Second Baptist School	Houston, Texas
F	10	Ethan Henderson	6 ft 8 in (2.03 m)	193 lb (88 kg)	RS Sr	Arkansas	Little Rock, Arkansas
F	11	Andersson Garcia	6 ft 7 in (2.01 m)	210 lb (95 kg)	Jr	Mississippi State	Moca, Dominican Republic
F	13	Solomon Washington	6 ft 7 in (2.01 m)	225 lb (102 kg)	Fr	Carver High School	New Orleans, Louisiana
F	15	Henry Coleman III	6 ft 8 in (2.03 m)	245 lb (111 kg)	Jr	Duke	Richmond, Virginia
G	20	Andre Gordon	6 ft 2 in (1.88 m)	185 lb (84 kg)	Sr	Sidney High School	Sidney, Ohio
G	22	Davin Watkins (W)	6 ft 1 in (1.85 m)	193 lb (88 kg)	So	Nolensville High School	Nolensville, Tennessee
G	23	Tyrece Radford	6 ft 2 in (1.88 m)	195 lb (88 kg)	RS Sr	Virginia Tech	Baton Rouge, Louisiana
G	24	Jaelyn Lee (W)	6 ft 6 in (1.98 m)	195 lb (88 kg)	Fr	Paris High School	Paris, Texas
F	31	Javonte Brown	7 ft 0 in (2.13 m)	255 lb (116 kg)	RS So	UConn	Toronto, Ontario
F	32	Ashton Smith	6 ft 9 in (2.06 m)	270 lb (122 kg)	RS Fr	Legacy the School of Sport Sciences	Spring, Texas
F	34	Julius Marble II	6 ft 9 in (2.06 m)	245 lb (111 kg)	Jr	Michigan State	Dallas, Texas
G	35	Manny Obaseki	6 ft 4 in (1.93 m)	189 lb (86 kg)	So	John Paul II High School	Allen, Texas

Head coach

- Buzz Williams (Oklahoma City)

Assistant coach(es)

- Devin Johnson (LSU New Orleans)
- Steve Roccaforte (Lamar)
- Lyle Wolf (Transylvania)

Legend

- (C) Team captain
- (S) Suspended
- (I) Ineligible
- (W) Walk-on
- Injured
- Current redshirt

Roster

== Schedule and results ==
Date time, TV	Rank^{#}	Opponent^{#}	Result	Record	High points	High rebounds	High assists	Site (attendance) city, state
Exhibition
November 4, 2022*; 7:00 p.m.		Texas A&M–Kingsville	W 90–47		15 – Washington	8 – Coleman III	5 – Obaseki	Reed Arena; College Station, TX
Non-conference regular season
November 7, 2022*; 7:00 p.m., SECN+/ESPN+		Louisiana–Monroe	W 87–54	1–0	18 – Taylor IV	7 – Coleman III	4 – Coleman III	Reed Arena (6,262); College Station, TX
November 11, 2022*; 7:00 p.m., SECN+/ESPN+		Abilene Christian	W 77–58	2–0	21 – Taylor IV	11 – Coleman III	2 – Taylor IV	Reed Arena (6,782); College Station, TX
November 17, 2022*; 3:00 p.m., ESPN2	No. 24	vs. Murray State; Myrtle Beach Invitational Quarterfinals	L 79–88	2–1	19 – Radford	6 – 4 Tied	6 – Radford	HTC Center (1,321); Myrtle Beach, SC
November 18, 2022*; 11:00 a.m., ESPNU	No. 24	vs. Colorado; Myrtle Beach Invitational Consolation round	L 75–103	2–2	13 – Hefner	5 – 2 Tied	3 – 2 Tied	HTC Center (1,332); Myrtle Beach, SC
November 20, 2022*; 3:30 p.m., ESPN+	No. 24	vs. Loyola–Chicago; Myrtle Beach Invitational 7th place game	W 67–51	3–2	13 – Coleman III	6 – Garcia	2 – 3 Tied	HTC Center (1,267); Myrtle Beach, SC
November 25, 2022*; 12:00 p.m., FS1		at DePaul	W 82–66	4–2	31 – Radford	7 – 2 Tied	6 – Coleman III	Wintrust Arena (2,703); Chicago, IL
November 30, 2022*; 7:00 p.m., SECN+/ESPN+		SMU	W 83–64	5–2	23 – Coleman III	6 – Radford	9 – Taylor IV	Reed Arena (6,956); College Station, TX
December 3, 2022*; 6:00 p.m., ESPNU		vs. Boise State; Battleground 2K22	L 71–86	5–3	16 – Taylor IV	5 – 2 Tied	6 – Taylor IV	Dickies Arena (2,812); Fort Worth, TX
December 11, 2022*; 5:00 p.m., ESPN2		Oregon State	W 72–54	6–3	16 – Dennis	7 – 2 Tied	6 – Taylor IV	Reed Arena (7,044); College Station, TX
December 17, 2022*; 6:00 p.m., ESPNU		at Memphis	L 79–83	6–4	25 – Taylor IV	10 – Radford	3 – Dennis	FedExForum (11,544); Memphis, TN
December 20, 2022*; 1:00 p.m., SECN+/ESPN+		Wofford	L 62–67	6–5	20 – Taylor IV	6 – Dennis	3 – Tied	Reed Arena (6,518); College Station, TX
December 27, 2022*; 7:00 p.m., SECN+/ESPN+		Northwestern State	W 64–52	7–5	24 – Coleman III	10 – Radford	3 – Taylor IV	Reed Arena (6,551); College Station, TX
December 30, 2022*; 6:00 p.m., SECN+/ESPN+		Prairie View A&M	W 86–66	8–5	20 – Radford	6 – Coleman III	3 – Coleman III	Reed Arena (7,174); College Station, TX
SEC regular season
January 4, 2023; 6:00 p.m., ESPNU		at Florida	W 66–63	9–5 (1–0)	17 – 3 Tied	6 – Dennis	2 – Taylor IV	O'Connell Center (7,023); Gainesville, FL
January 7, 2023; 5:00 p.m., SECN		LSU	W 69–56	10–5 (2–0)	17 – 2 Tied	9 – Marble	6 – Taylor IV	Reed Arena (9,319); College Station, TX
January 11, 2023; 7:30 p.m., SECN		No. 20 Missouri	W 82–64	11–5 (3–0)	16 – Radford	12 – Dennis	6 – Radford	Reed Arena (6,916); College Station, TX
January 14, 2023; 5:00 p.m., SECN		at South Carolina	W 94–53	12–5 (4–0)	20 – Taylor IV	11 – Coleman III	3 – 4 Tied	Colonial Life Arena (10,883); Columbia, SC
January 18, 2023; 6:00 p.m., SECN		Florida	W 54–52	13–5 (5–0)	19 – Marble	16 – Dennis	5 – Taylor IV	Reed Arena (12,126); College Station, TX
January 21, 2023; 1:00 p.m., ESPN		at Kentucky	L 67–76	13–6 (5–1)	22 – Radford	6 – 3 Tied	7 – Taylor IV	Rupp Arena (20,017); Lexington, KY
January 25, 2023; 8:00 p.m., ESPN2		at No. 15 Auburn	W 79–63	14–6 (6–1)	30 – Radford	9 – Radford	4 – Taylor IV	Neville Arena (9,121); Auburn, AL
January 28, 2023; 7:30 p.m., SECN		Vanderbilt	W 72–66	15–6 (7–1)	18 – Coleman III	8 – Garcia	7 – Taylor IV	Reed Arena (12,646); College Station, TX
January 31, 2023; 6:00 p.m., ESPN2		at Arkansas	L 70–81	15–7 (7–2)	18 – 2 Tied	14 – Coleman III	6 – Radford	Bud Walton Arena (19,200); Fayetteville, AR
February 4, 2023; 7:30 p.m., SECN		Georgia	W 82–57	16–7 (8–2)	15 – 2 Tied	8 – Garcia	6 – Taylor IV	Reed Arena (12,640); College Station, TX
February 7, 2023; 6:00 p.m., ESPN2		Auburn	W 83–78	17–7 (9–2)	22 – Taylor IV	7 – Marble	7 – Taylor IV	Reed Arena (10,248); College Station, TX
February 11, 2023; 7:30 p.m., SECN		at LSU	W 74–62	18–7 (10–2)	23 – Taylor IV	8 – Garcia	4 – Taylor IV	Pete Maravich Assembly Center (10,328); Baton Rouge, LA
February 15, 2023; 8:00 p.m., ESPN2		Arkansas	W 62–56	19–7 (11–2)	18 – Taylor IV	11 – Dennis	4 – Taylor IV	Reed Arena (11,315); College Station, TX
February 18, 2023; 5:00 p.m., ESPN2		at Missouri	W 69–60	20–7 (12–2)	21 – Taylor IV	10 – Dennis	6 – Taylor IV	Mizzou Arena (15,061); Columbia, MO
February 21, 2023; 6:00 p.m., ESPN	No. 25	No. 11 Tennessee	W 68–63	21–7 (13–2)	25 – Taylor IV	9 – Marble	3 – Gordon	Reed Arena (12,989); College Station, TX
February 25, 2023; 2:30 p.m., SECN	No. 25	at Mississippi State	L 62–69	21–8 (13–3)	21 – Taylor IV	7 – Tied	4 – Tied	Humphrey Coliseum (6,065); Starkville, MS
February 28, 2023; 8:00 p.m., ESPNU	No. 24	at Ole Miss	W 69–61	22–8 (14–3)	13 – Radford	8 – Gordon	7 – Taylor IV	SJB Pavilion (6,008); Oxford, MS
March 4, 2023; 11:00 a.m., CBS	No. 24	No. 2 Alabama	W 67–61	23–8 (15–3)	28 – Taylor IV	7 – Tied	4 – Radford	Reed Arena (12,989); College Station, TX
SEC tournament
March 10, 2023; 6:00 p.m., SECN	(2) No. 18	vs. (10) Arkansas; Quarterfinals	W 67–61	24–8	18 – Taylor IV	11 – Coleman III	3 – Taylor IV	Bridgestone Arena (17,989); Nashville, TN
March 11, 2023; 2:30 p.m., ESPN	(2) No. 18	vs. (6) Vanderbilt; Semifinals	W 87–75	25–8	25 – Taylor IV	7 – Dennis	5 – Radford	Bridgestone Arena (17,528); Nashville, TN
March 12, 2023; 12:00 p.m., ESPN	(2) No. 18	vs. (1) No. 4 Alabama; Championship	L 63–82	25–9	14 – Dennis	9 – Coleman III	3 – Taylor IV	Bridgestone Arena (18,690); Nashville, TN
NCAA Tournament
March 16, 2023*; 8:55 pm, TBS	(7 MW) No. 17	vs. (10 MW) Penn State; First Round	L 59–76	25–10	19 – Dennis	9 – Garcia	3 – Radford	Wells Fargo Arena (16,728); Des Moines, IA
*Non-conference game. ^{#}Rankings from AP Poll. (#) Tournament seedings in parentheses. All times are in Central Time.

== See also ==
- 2022–23 Texas A&M Aggies women's basketball team
