= David Edwards (basketball) =

American basketball player (1971–2020)

Personal information
- Born: December 2, 1971 Richmond, Virginia, U.S.
- Died: March 24, 2020 (aged 48) Queens, New York, U.S.
- Listed height: 5 ft 10 in (1.78 m)
- Listed weight: 190 lb (86 kg)

Career information
- High school: Andrew Jackson (Queens, New York)
- College: Georgetown (1989–1990); Texas A&M (1991–1994)
- NBA draft: 1994: undrafted
- Playing career: 1994–1997
- Position: Point guard

Career history
- 1995–1996: BC Šilutė
- 1996: KR

Career highlights
- LKL assist leader (1996); LKL steals leader (1996); 3× First-team All-SWC (1992–1994)

David Edwards (December 2, 1971 – March 24, 2020) was an American basketball player. A 5'10" point guard, he played college basketball for Georgetown and Texas A&M before going on to play professionally in Europe. In 1996, he set the Úrvalsdeild karla assists single game record with 18.

== High school career ==
Edwards was born in Richmond, Virginia and moved to New York City before high school, living in public housing. and played at Andrew Jackson High School under coach Chuck Granby. At Jackson he averaged 41 points per game as a senior. His 947 points during that season was a New York City scoring record. It was a New York State Public High School Athletic Association for one day that Edwards set on February 17, 1989 surpassing Curtis Aiken 924 single-season record in a playoff loss before Marcus Whitfield reached 958 in his 21st game, a playoff win for Burgard Vocational High School on February 18. He was considered to be one of the best players to ever come out of Queens, New York. His ability led to debate as to whether or not he was better than future NBA player Kenny Anderson. Edwards played streetball at Rucker Park and was known to impress the crowd. He committed to Georgetown over offers from Iowa and Loyola Marymount.

== College career ==
Edwards played initially at Georgetown University, where he averaged 5.4 points per game as a freshman. He posted 14 assists in this first game. Through his first 12 games Edwards led the Hoyas with 89 assists. He experienced disagreements with coach John Thompson and transferred. This disagreement was based on Thompson focusing on big men such as Alonzo Mourning and Dikembe Mutombo, and Edwards later admitted was immature and was not "a complete player."

Edwards transferred to play at Texas A&M under Kermit Davis, but Davis resigned after one season due to recruiting violations. Davis was replaced as head coach by Tony Barone, and Edwards needed time to adjust to the coach's structured offense. As a senior, he averaged 13.3 points, 5.6 rebounds and 8.8 assists per game. He was one of six players to post a triple-double on consecutive games on March 5, and March 10, 1994. His 265 assists as a senior remain a school record. During his senior season at Texas A&M, he was the runner-up for the Frances Pomeroy Naismith Award, given to the best senior in the country under 6-feet tall. Edwards was a three-time All-Southwest Conference selection. During his career at Texas A&M, he tallied 1,167 points, 602 assists and 228 steals, and he was the school's total assists and steals leader until 2016 when he was surpassed by Alex Caruso. Edwards maintained a 6.5 Assists college average while Caruso had a 4.7 assists college average.

== Professional career ==
=== Lithuania ===
Edwards began his professional basketball career with BC Šilutė in the Lithuanian Basketball League during the 1995–1996 season where he averaged 23.2 points, 8.7 assists and 4.4 steals per game, leading the league in assists and steals while coming in second in the league in scoring.

=== Iceland ===
He signed with KR in the Icelandic Úrvalsdeild karla in October 1996, replacing Champ Wrencher. In his first game on 17 October, he had 22 points, 8 rebounds and 7 assists in a 79–79 tie against ÍA in the Icelandic Company Cup. In the second game, he had 12 points, 13 assists and 7 steals in KR's 82–79 victory. He helped KR to the finals of the Company Cup in November where they lost to Keflavík 101–107. In the game, Edwards had 25 points, 10 assists and 5 steals. In his six games in the Company Cup, he averaged 18.2 points and 10.5 assists.

On 8 December, Edwards set a Úrvalsdeild record with 18 assists in a 88–91 loss against ÍR, breaking Jón Kr. Gíslason's old record of 17 assists set in 1991. The record stood until 21 November 2022, when it was broken by Vincent Malik Shahid. On 15 December, he scored a season high 38 points in a 106–111 loss against Grindavík in the Úrvalsdeild. Following the game, he had a heated discussion with referee Helgi Bragason which ended with Helgi disqualifying him from the game which automatically resulted in a 1-game suspension. Following the Christmas break, Edwards was replaced by Geoff Herman. He appeared in 8 games in the Úrvalsdeild, averaging 20.8 points, 10.4 assists and 4.3 steals per game.

== Post-basketball career ==
Edwards served as a recreation manager at the non-profit organization Elmcor Youth and Services Activities. He coached basketball at The Mary Louis Academy in Queens.

== Personal life and death ==
His father, Dave Edwards was a 4-year player and a 3-year captain at Virginia Commonwealth University. He had two sons, David and Corey. Corey played basketball at George Mason and coaches at Montverde Academy.

Edwards died in Queens, New York of COVID-19 on March 24, 2020. He was just 48 years old.
