= Claude Riley =

American basketball player

Claude Edward Riley Jr (born September 8, 1960) is an American retired professional basketball player.

== College career ==
Riley played in the NCAA, with the Texas A&M Aggies.

== Professional career ==
Riley was drafted by the NBA's Philadelphia 76ers, with the 64th pick of the 1983 NBA draft, but he never played in the NBA. He played professionally in Spain and Italy.

== Teams ==
- 1979–83: Texas A&M Aggies (NCAA)
- 1983–84: Cottorella Rieti (Italy)
- 1984–87: CAI Zaragoza (Spain)
- 1987–88: Spondilatte Cremona (Italy)
- 1988–90: RCD Espanyol (Spain)
- 1990–93: CB Breogán (Spain)
- 1993–94: CB Málaga (Spain)
- 1994–95: CB Salamanca (Spain)

== Personal ==
Born in Crockett, Texas, Riley currently lives in Houston.
