= Winston Crite =

Retired American professional basketball player

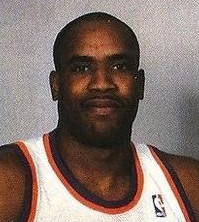
- Crite in 1987

Personal information
- Born: June 20, 1965 (age 61) Bakersfield, California, U.S.
- Listed height: 6 ft 7 in (2.01 m)
- Listed weight: 233 lb (106 kg)

Career information
- High school: South (Bakersfield, California)
- College: Texas A&M (1983–1987)
- NBA draft: 1987: 3rd round, 53rd overall pick
- Drafted by: Phoenix Suns
- Playing career: 1987–1997
- Position: Power forward
- Number: 12

Career history
- 1987–1988: Phoenix Suns
- 1988–1989: Brisbane Bullets
- 1989–1990: Grand Rapids Hoops
- 1990: Presto Tivolis
- 1990–1991: Grand Rapids Hoops
- 1991: Grupo IFA Granollers
- 1992: Alaska Milkmen
- 1992–1993: ASA Sceaux
- 1993: Cholet Basket
- 1994–1995: BCM Gravelines
- 1995–1996: Montpellier Basket
- 1996–1997: Racing de Avellaneda

Career highlights
- French 2nd Division Foreign Player's MVP (1993)
- Stats at NBA.com
- Stats at Basketball Reference

Winston Arnel Crite (born June 20, 1965) is a retired American professional basketball player. After playing college basketball for the Texas A&M Aggies, Crite was selected in the third round (53rd overall pick) in the 1987 NBA draft by the Phoenix Suns and spent two following seasons in the National Basketball Association (NBA) playing for Suns. Afterwards he played professionally in Europe. At 6 ft 7 in (2.01 m) and 233 pounds (106 kg), he played power forward.

== Early years ==
Winston Crite was born and raised in Bakersfield, California. He attended South High School Bakersfield, where, as a sophomore, he led his team to the San Joaquin Valley Championship. In his senior year, Crite was voted by The Bakersfield Californian as the All Area Player of the Year, and was later named to the All Northern California all-star team.

== Texas A&M University (1983–1987) ==
Crite chose to attend Texas A&M University and play basketball under coach Shelby Metcalf. In his very first game, against Texas Lutheran in 1983–1984, Crite became the first freshman in Aggie history to post a double-double (in this case, 24 points, 15 rebounds) in his first game. Only one other Aggie freshman, Joseph Jones, has duplicated that feat.

Crite started 118 of the 123 games of his career, and showed steady improvement throughout his four years. His freshman year (1983–1984), Crite averaged 8.9 points, 6.1 rebounds, 1.2 assists, and .9 blocks per game and completed 53% of his field goal attempts. The following year, he averaged 12.1 points per game, 8.2 rebounds, 1.2 assists, and 2.2 blocks, completing 56.7 percent of his field goals. In the 1985–1986 season, Crite completed an impressive 58.0% of his field goals, averaging 13.3 points, 8 rebounds, 1.6 assists, and 1.3 blocks per game. By his senior season he was averaging 16.8 points, 2.0 blocks, 7.4 rebounds, and 1.3 assists per game, completing 56.1% of his field goals. For his accomplishments, Crite was a four-time "All Southwest West Conference" choice and was named "All Tournament" for three straight years.

Just as Crite appeared to be at the top of his game in his senior year, the team began struggling, losing nine of their last eleven games to finish the regular season 14–13. The Aggies were seeded eighth in the Southwest Conference, meaning they would open the conference tournament facing the top-seeded TCU Horned Frogs, who were ranked 15th nationally. After Crite scored thirty points in a stunning upset of TCU, the team defeated the defending tournament champion, Texas Tech before beating number two seed Baylor in the tournament championship game, where Crite was named the tournament's Most Valuable Player. Winning the tournament gave the Aggies an automatic berth in the NCAA Tournament, their last NCAA tournament appearance until 2006.

Crite holds the Aggie record as the all-time leading shot blocker (200). He is second on the school's list of leading rebounders (913) and for field goal percentage (.562). He has attempted the third-most number of free throws, with 518 attempts, and is the fourth leading Scorer in school history.

Crite was inducted into the Texas A&M Hall of Fame in September 2009.

== Professional basketball ==
Crite was selected by the Phoenix Suns with the seventh pick in the third round of the 1987 NBA draft.

In his first season, 1987–1988, Crite scored 87 points in his 29 games, averaging 3.0 points per game with 2.2 rebounds and 0.5 assists per game. The following season, he played for a total of only 6 minutes in two games, and made only one rebound, before being placed on the injured list in January 1988.

Crite played the 1989 season in Australia's NBL, with the Brisbane Bullets. He made the Northern All-Stars team for the Australian NBL All-Star Game played at the "Glasshouse" in Melbourne, and played a significant second half in a narrow two-point loss to the South. Crite averaged 20.8 points on 57% shooting from the field, and 7.5 rebounds per game. After some questionable management decisions during the year, Winston left the Bullets in the 1990 season. He then spent several years playing professional basketball in Europe, earning All-League honors in Spain and France. Crite was named the Most Valuable Foreign Player of the French 2nd Division, while playing with ASA Sceaux in 1993 (Pro-B League). He also led that team to a French 2nd Division championship that year. After that season, he was also named to The Buckler all Europe Team.

== Retirement ==
After Crite's retirement from professional basketball, he returned to his hometown of Bakersfield. He was soon approached by parents of local student-athletes to mentor and train their children. In 2002, Crite and his wife Mechelle formed The Footwork Shop, Inc, a basketball training club. Instead of offering more traditional league-type play, Crite's company offers year-round skill training, focusing especially on advanced footwork, without playing actual basketball games. As of April 11, 2016 he is the School Community Specialist and Varsity Boys’ Basketball Coach at Frontier High School also located in Bakersfield.

== Career statistics ==
Legend
GP	Games played	GS	Games started	MPG	Minutes per game
FG%	Field goal percentage	3P%	3-point field goal percentage	FT%	Free throw percentage
RPG	Rebounds per game	APG	Assists per game	SPG	Steals per game
BPG	Blocks per game	PPG	Points per game	**Bold**	Career high

=== NBA ===
==== Regular season ====
Year	Team	GP	GS	MPG	FG%	3P%	FT%	RPG	APG	SPG	BPG	PPG
1987–88	Phoenix	**29**	0	**8.9**	**.500**	–	**.760**	**2.2**	**.5**	**.2**	**.3**	**3.0**
1988–89	Phoenix	2	0	3.0	.000	–	–	.5	.0	.0	.0	.0
Career		31	0	8.5	.479	–	.760	2.1	.5	.2	.3	2.8
