= Bernard King (basketball, born 1981) =

American basketball player (born 1981)

Personal information
- Born: July 24, 1981 (age 45) Gibsland, Louisiana, US
- Listed height: 6 ft 5 in (1.96 m)

Career information
- High school: Gibsland-Coleman Complex (Gibsland, Louisiana)
- College: Texas A&M (1999–2003)
- NBA draft: 2003: undrafted
- Playing career: 2003–2019
- Position: Guard
- Number: 32

Career history
- 2003: Fenerbahçe
- 2004–2005: Huntsville Flight
- 2005: ASVEL Villeurbanne
- 2005–2006: Tulsa 66ers
- 2006: Bnei HaSharon
- 2006–2007: Keravnos
- 2007: Strasbourg IG
- 2008: Mersin BB
- 2008: Antalya BB
- 2009: Ventspils
- 2009–2010: APOEL
- 2010–2011: STB Le Havre
- 2011–2012: Châlons Reims
- 2012: SLUC Nancy
- 2012–2013: STB Le Havre
- 2013: Selçuk Üniversitesi
- 2013–2014: Donetsk
- 2014: Krasny Oktyabr
- 2015: Chorale Roanne Basket
- 2015–2016: Olympique Antibes
- 2016–2017: STB Le Havre
- 2017–2019: UJAP Quimper 29

Career highlights
- LBL champion (2009); Louisiana Mr. Basketball (1999)

Victor Bernard King Jr. (born July 24, 1981) is an American professional basketball player for UJAP Quimper 29 of the LNB Pro B. He played college basketball for Texas A&M University.

King holds numerous Big 12 Conference and Texas A&M records. King left A&M as the top scorer in Big 12 conference history, as well as third in the league for all-time career assists. He led the Aggies in scoring and assists in all four of his seasons, and ranks among Texas A&M's all-time leaders in points (first), three-point field goals made (first), and assists (second).

== Early years ==
Bernard King was born in Gibsland, Louisiana, the son of Victor King, a former Louisiana Tech basketball player and second-round NBA draft pick by the Los Angeles Lakers from Newellton, Louisiana and Vernita King. From the time young Bernard learned to walk, he would accompany his father to the gym, and began to express an interest in playing with the basketball too.

When he was eight, King's parents brought him to basketball camps run by Louisiana Tech and the Dallas Mavericks. Organizers of those camps realized quickly that King played at a much higher level than others in his age group, and recommended that he instead play in the Amateur Athletic Union (AAU). By the time he was in eighth grade, King was playing alongside high-school juniors and seniors. When given the opportunity to play in place of a guard who had fouled out, King sank three three-pointers in a row, helping his team to win the game. As a 14-year-old, he played on an AAU team for 17-year-olds, scoring six three-pointers in one game in the state playoffs before helping the team to win a national championship.

King played with the varsity all four years of his career at Gibsland-Coleman Complex High School, helping them to a 143–34 record in that time period. In his career, he accumulated 4,018 points, more than 1,000 rebounds, and 1348 assists. In his senior year, King averaged 28.9 points, 8.3 rebounds, 11.2 assists, 5.4 steals, and 3.7 blocks, leading the team to the state championship, the school's first since 1984. He earned 1998 AAU All-America honors, and was named Louisiana Mr. Basketball by the Louisiana Sports Writers Association. Despite the time involved in maintaining his dual basketball careers, King made sure to devote enough time to his academic career, graduating from high school with a 3.8 GPA.

Bob Gibbons named King the 33rd best prospect in the country, and almost every major recruiting service ranked him as one of the top 75 prospects. Although he was recruited by Purdue University, University of Minnesota, Seton Hall, LSU, University of Wyoming, and Tulane University, King chose to attend Texas A&M University to play under coach Melvin Watkins and attempt to turn around the program.

== College career ==
As a freshman at Texas A&M, King started in all 28 games and averaged 16.9 points, 4.8 rebounds, and 4.1 assists per game. He led the Aggies in scoring, assists, blocks (0.6), and three-point field goals (79), and ranked second on the team in rebounding, steals (1.6), free-throw percentage (.702) and three-point percentage (.346). After setting a Big 12 freshman season record for scoring average and tying the Big 12 record for three-pointers, he was named the Big 12 Freshman of the Year by the Associated Press. Against Colorado, he had a career-high 34 points, while in a game versus Nebraska, he scored 30 points and had ten rebounds. After scoring 17 points with nine rebounds in the A&M upset of Oklahoma State, King wa named the ESPN.com National Freshman of the Week.

The following year, King, who started 29 of 30 games, including all 16 in conference play, was named to the NABC Second-Team All-District. He averaged 18.0 points, 3.8 rebounds, and 4.8 assists per game, joining Duke's Jason Williams and Monmouth's Rahsaan Johnson as the only Division 1 players during the 2000–01 season to achieve at least 18 points and 4.6 assists per game. King scored a season-high 31 points against Missouri, and versus Lamar University tied the school record for three-point field goals made, completing 8 of his 11 attempts, and scoring a total of 30 points in the game. In his team's two games against archrival Texas, King recorded 23 points and 21 points. King led the team in assists and steals (1.4).

In his junior season, King became the only player in the Big 12 to rank in the top ten in both scoring (fifth) and assists (sixth), and was only the fourth player in league history to record a triple-double after a 20-point, 10 rebound, ten assist performance against Texas Tech. He almost managed a second triple-double against Long Beach State University, but had to be satisfied with 20 points, 11 rebounds, and only 9 assists. For the season, King averaged 17.2 points, 4.7 rebounds, and 4.7 assists.

King played in 30 of the team's 31 games, missing the contest with Miami after suffering a concussion. He earned Big 12 Player of the Week honors after scoring 30points, with seven assists and six rebounds, against then No-24 Texas.

In his senior year, King averaged 17.0 points, 4.0 rebounds, and 5.6 assists, earning him a second team All-Big 12 honor. He posted a season-high 29 points and seven assists against Missouri, with 27 points and 7 assists against Oklahoma State.

King left A&M as the top scorer in Big 12 conference history, as well as third in the league for all-time career assists. He led the Aggies in scoring and assists in all four of his season, and ranks among Texas A&M's all-time leaders in points (first), three-point field goals made (first), and assists (second).

== Professional career ==
In 2003–2004, King played for Fenerbahçe in Turkey, averaging 12.7 points and 4.4 rebounds in the nine games he played. In the 2004 Development-League Draft, King was selected as the 28th pick overall, chosen by Huntsville in the 5th round. After playing twenty-give games with the Huntsville Flight, averaging a team-high 18.4 points, 3.7 rebounds, and 4.8 assists, King finished the season in the French ProA League, playing for ASVEL and averaging 12.0 points, 2.9 rebounds, and 4.9 assists. He signed with Bnei HaSharon in April 2006 as a replacement for Adam Harrington, but suffered a season-ending injury after playing just one game In October 2007 King signed with Strasbourg IG.

On January 18, 2008, King signed with Mersin BŞB. S.K. but later moved to BK Ventspils where he won the Latvian Championship and in the final deciding game seven scored 20 points, 9 assists and 9 rebounds. For the 2009–10 season King signed for Cypriot club APOEL and remains to be one of the only European players to hold career averages over 12.0 points, 4.0 rebounds, and 4.0 assists per game. In January 2012 he signed with SLUC Nancy until the end of the season. In July 2013, he signed with BC Donetsk.

In April 2015, he signed with Chorale Roanne Basket of the LNB Pro B.

On January 24, 2018, he signed with UJAP Quimper 29 of the LNB Pro B.
