= 2022–23 Alabama Crimson Tide men's basketball team =

American college basketball season

2022–23 Alabama Crimson Tide men's basketball

SEC regular season & tournament champions

NCAA tournament, Sweet Sixteen
- Conference: Southeastern Conference

Ranking
- Coaches: No. 4
- AP: No. 1
- Record: 31–6 (16–2 SEC)
- Head coach: Nate Oats (4th season)
- Assistant coaches: Charlie Henry (4th season); Bryan Hodgson (4th season); Antoine Pettway (11th season)
- Home arena: Coleman Coliseum

2022–23 Southeastern Conference men's basketball standings
	Conf.				Overall
Team	W		L	PCT	W		L	PCT
No. 1 Alabama†	16	–	2	.889	31	–	6	.838
No. 17 Texas A&M	15	–	3	.833	25	–	10	.714
Kentucky	12	–	6	.667	22	–	12	.647
No. 23 Missouri	11	–	7	.611	25	–	10	.714
No. 20 Tennessee	11	–	7	.611	25	–	11	.694
Vanderbilt	11	–	7	.611	22	–	15	.595
Auburn	10	–	8	.556	21	–	13	.618
Florida	9	–	9	.500	16	–	17	.485
Mississippi State	8	–	10	.444	21	–	13	.618
Arkansas	8	–	10	.444	22	–	14	.611
Georgia	6	–	12	.333	16	–	16	.500
South Carolina	4	–	14	.222	11	–	21	.344
Ole Miss	3	–	15	.167	12	–	21	.364
LSU	2	–	16	.111	14	–	19	.424
† 2023 SEC tournament winner Rankings from AP poll

The 2022–23 Alabama Crimson Tide men's basketball team represented the University of Alabama in the 2022–23 NCAA Division I men's basketball season. The team was led by fourth-year head coach Nate Oats. They played their home games at Coleman Coliseum in Tuscaloosa, Alabama, as a member of the Southeastern Conference. They finished the season 31–6, 16–2 in SEC play to win the regular season championship. They defeated Mississippi State, Missouri, and Texas A&M to win the SEC tournament championship. As a result, they received the conference's automatic bid to the NCAA tournament as the No. 1 seed in the South region. As the number one overall seed in the tournament, they defeated Texas A&M–Corpus Christi and Maryland to advance to the Sweet Sixteen. There they were upset by San Diego State.

== Previous season ==
The Crimson Tide finished the 2021–22 season 19–14, 9–9 in SEC Play to finish a five-way tie for fifth place. They lost in the second round of the SEC tournament to Vanderbilt. They received an at-large bid to the NCAA tournament as the No. 6 seed in the West Region, where they were upset in the First Round by Notre Dame.

== Offseason ==
=== Departures ===
Name	Number	Pos.	Height	Weight	Year	Hometown	Reason for departure
Jusaun Holt	1	G	6'6"	190	Freshman	Tacoma, WA	Transferred to Georgia
JD Davison	3	G	6'3"	195	Freshman	Letohatchee, AL	Declare for 2022 NBA draft
Juwan Gary	4	F	6'6"	218	RS Sophomore	Columbia, SC	Transferred to Nebraska
Jaden Shackelford	5	G	6'3"	200	Junior	Hesperia, CA	Declare for 2022 NBA draft
Keon Ellis	14	G	6'6"	175	Senior	Eustis, FL	Graduated/undrafted in 2022 NBA draft
Tyler Barnes	15	F	6'8"	210	GS Senior	Louisville, KY	Walk-on; graduated
Britton Johnson	21	G	6'4"	185	Senior	Mountain Brook, AL	Walk-on; graduate transferred to Samford
Keon Ambrose-Hylton	22	F	6'8"	215	Sophomore	Toronto, ON	Transferred to SMU
James Rojas	33	F	6'8"	220	RS Senior	Jamestown, NY	Graduate transferred to Wichita State
Alex Tchikou	35	F	6'11"	230	RS Freshman	Paris, France	Transferred to Rhode Island

=== Incoming transfers ===
Name	Number	Pos.	Height	Weight	Year	Hometown	Previous School
Mark Sears	1	G	6'1"	185	Junior	Muscle Shoals, AL	Ohio
Dominick Welch	10	G	6'5"	205	GS Senior	Buffalo, NY	St. Bonaventure
Nick Pringle	23	F	6'10"	220	RS Freshman	Seabrook, SC	Dodge City Community College

=== 2022 recruiting class ===
College recruiting information
Name	Hometown	School	Height	Weight	Commit date
Brandon Miller #6 PG	Antioch, TN	Cane Ridge High School	6 ft 9 in (2.06 m)	195 lb (88 kg)	Nov 1, 2021
Brandon Miller #6 PG	Recruit ratings: Rivals: 247Sports: ESPN: (92)				
Jaden Bradley #4 PG	Rochester, NY	IMG Academy	6 ft 3 in (1.91 m)	195 lb (88 kg)	Sep 30, 2021
Jaden Bradley #4 PG	Recruit ratings: Rivals: 247Sports: ESPN: (90)				
Rylan Griffen #10 SF	Richardson, TX	Richardson High School	6 ft 5 in (1.96 m)	180 lb (82 kg)	Nov 9, 2021
Rylan Griffen #10 SF	Recruit ratings: Rivals: 247Sports: ESPN: (86)				
Noah Clowney #20 C	Roebuck, SC	Dorman High School	6 ft 10 in (2.08 m)	210 lb (95 kg)	Nov 1, 2021
Noah Clowney #20 C	Recruit ratings: Rivals: 247Sports: ESPN: (84)				
Overall recruit ranking:
Note: In many cases, Scout, Rivals, 247Sports, On3, and ESPN may conflict in their listings of height and weight.; In these cases, the average was taken. ESPN grades are on a 100-point scale.; Sources: "2022 Alabama Commits". Rivals.; "ESPN- Alabama Crimson Tide Men's Basketball Recruiting". ESPN.; "2022 Team Ranking". Rivals.

=== 2023 recruiting class ===
College recruiting information (2023)
Name	Hometown	School	Height	Weight	Commit date
Sam Walters #43 PF	Oxford, FL	The Villages Charter High School	6 ft 8 in (2.03 m)	210 lb (95 kg)	Jun 3, 2022
Sam Walters #43 PF	Recruit ratings: Rivals: 247Sports: ESPN: (81)				
R.J. Johnson #43 SG	Huntsville, AL	Virgil I. Grissom High School	6 ft 2 in (1.88 m)	190 lb (86 kg)	Aug 26, 2022
R.J. Johnson #43 SG	Recruit ratings: Rivals: 247Sports: ESPN: (79)				
Overall recruit ranking:
Note: In many cases, Scout, Rivals, 247Sports, On3, and ESPN may conflict in their listings of height and weight.; In these cases, the average was taken. ESPN grades are on a 100-point scale.; Sources: "2023 Alabama Commits". Rivals.; "ESPN- Alabama Crimson Tide Men's Basketball Recruiting". ESPN.; "2023 Team Ranking". Rivals.

== Preseason ==
=== SEC media poll ===
The SEC media poll was released on October 19, 2022.

Media poll
Predicted finish	Team
1	Kentucky
2	Arkansas
3	Tennessee
4	Auburn
5	Alabama
6	Texas A&M
7	Florida
8	LSU
9	Ole Miss
10	Mississippi State
11	Missouri
12	Vanderbilt
13	Georgia
14	South Carolina

== Roster ==
2022–23 Alabama Crimson Tide men's basketball team
Players
Coaches

Pos.	#	Name	Height	Weight	Year	Previous school	Hometown
G	0	Jaden Bradley	6 ft 3 in (1.91 m)	185 lb (84 kg)	Fr	IMG Academy	Rochester, NY
G	1	Mark Sears	6 ft 1 in (1.85 m)	185 lb (84 kg)	Jr	Ohio	Muscle Shoals, AL
G	3	Rylan Griffen	6 ft 5 in (1.96 m)	180 lb (82 kg)	Fr	Richardson HS	Dallas, TX
F	4	Noah Gurley	6 ft 8 in (2.03 m)	215 lb (98 kg)	GS	Furman	Fayetteville, GA
G	5	Jahvon Quinerly	6 ft 1 in (1.85 m)	175 lb (79 kg)	RS Sr	Villanova	Hackensack, NJ
G	10	Dominick Welch	6 ft 5 in (1.96 m)	205 lb (93 kg)	GS	St. Bonaventure	Buffalo, NY
G	12	Delaney Heard (W)	6 ft 3 in (1.91 m)	198 lb (90 kg)	Jr	Oak Hill Academy	Canton, GA
C	14	Charles Bediako	7 ft 0 in (2.13 m)	225 lb (102 kg)	So	IMG Academy	Brampton, ON, Canada
F	15	Noah Clowney	6 ft 10 in (2.08 m)	210 lb (95 kg)	Fr	Dorman HS	Roebuck, SC
F	23	Nick Pringle	6 ft 8 in (2.03 m)	200 lb (91 kg)	RS So	Dodge City Community College	Seabrook, SC
F	24	Brandon Miller	6 ft 9 in (2.06 m)	200 lb (91 kg)	Fr	Cane Ridge HS	Antioch, TN
G	25	Nimari Burnett	6 ft 4 in (1.93 m)	190 lb (86 kg)	Jr	Texas Tech	Chicago, IL
G	30	Adam Cottrell (W)	6 ft 3 in (1.91 m)	200 lb (91 kg)	Sr	Lakeview Academy	Flowery Branch, GA
F	31	Max Scharnowski (W)	6 ft 6 in (1.98 m)	205 lb (93 kg)	Jr	Wheaton Academy	Elgin, IL
G	32	Kai Spears (W)	6 ft 2 in (1.88 m)	160 lb (73 kg)	Fr	Bishop Canevin HS	Pittsburgh, PA
G	34	Jaden Quinerly (W)	6 ft 0 in (1.83 m)	155 lb (70 kg)	Jr	Ramsey HS	Hackensack, NJ

Head coach

- Nate Oats (Maranatha Baptist)

Assistant coach(es)

- Charlie Henry (Madonna)
- Bryan Hodgson (Fredonia State)
- Antoine Pettway (Alabama)

Legend

- (C) Team captain
- (S) Suspended
- (I) Ineligible
- (W) Walk-on
- Injured
- Current redshirt

Roster

- On Dec. 28, 2022, Alabama coach Nate Oats said Darius Miles was away from the team “with a personal matter.”
- On Jan. 15, 2023, Miles among 2 charged with capital murder in shooting death on the Strip early Sunday morning and he is no longer active in the roster.

== Schedule and results ==
Date time, TV	Rank^{#}	Opponent^{#}	Result	Record	High points	High rebounds	High assists	Site (attendance) city, state
Exhibition
October 29, 2022*; 2:00 p.m.	No. 20	Southern Illinois	W 73–64		14 – Miller	8 – Tied	3 – Welch	Foster Auditorium (2,000); Tuscaloosa, AL
Regular Season
November 7, 2022*; 7:30 p.m., SECN+	No. 20	Longwood	W 75–54	1–0	14 – Tied	13 – Miller	5 – Sears	Coleman Coliseum (10,472); Tuscaloosa, AL
November 11, 2022*; 7:00 p.m., SECN+	No. 20	Liberty	W 95–59	2–0	22 – Sears	8 – Tied	4 – Sears	Coleman Coliseum (10,270); Tuscaloosa, AL
November 15, 2022*; 9:00 p.m., ESPNU	No. 18	at South Alabama	W 65–55	3–0	19 – Miller	15 – Clowney	3 – Miller	Mitchell Center (7,673); Mobile, AL
November 18, 2022*; 8:00 p.m., SECN	No. 18	Jacksonville State	W 104–62	4–0	28 – Miller	10 – Clowney	8 – Quinerly	Coleman Coliseum (9,018); Tuscaloosa, AL
November 24, 2022*; 9:30 p.m., ESPN	No. 18	vs. No. 12 Michigan State; Phil Knight Invitational Quarterfinals	W 81–70	5–0	24 – Miller	9 – Miller	5 – Tied	Moda Center; Portland, OR
November 25, 2022*; 8:30 p.m., ESPN	No. 18	vs. No. 20 UConn; Phil Knight Invitational Semifinals	L 67–82	5–1	18 – Miller	9 – Miller	4 – Bradley	Veterans Memorial Coliseum; Portland, OR
November 27, 2022*; 2:30 p.m., ESPN	No. 18	vs. No. 1 North Carolina; Phil Knight Invitational 3rd place game	W 103–101 ^{4OT}	6–1	24 – Sears	16 – Bediako	8 – Quinerly	Veterans Memorial Coliseum (1,921); Portland, OR
December 3, 2022*; 7:30 p.m., SECN+	No. 11т	South Dakota State	W 78–65	7–1	22 – Clowney	9 – Tied	7 – Quinerly	Coleman Coliseum (9,086); Tuscaloosa, AL
December 10, 2022*; 2:00 p.m., ABC	No. 8	at No. 1 Houston	W 71–65	8–1	16 – Clowney	11 – Clowney	4 – Bradley	Fertitta Center (7,718); Houston, TX
December 13, 2022*; 8:00 p.m., ESPN2	No. 4	Memphis	W 91–88	9–1	24 – Miller	9 – Clowney	5 – Tied	Coleman Coliseum (9,195); Tuscaloosa, AL
December 17, 2022*; 12:00 p.m., CBS	No. 4	vs. No. 15 Gonzaga; C.M. Newton Classic	L 90–100	9–2	36 – Miller	13 – Clowney	4 – Bradley	Legacy Arena (15,847); Birmingham, AL
December 20, 2022*; 6:00 p.m., SECN	No. 9	Jackson State	W 84–64	10–2	16 – Gurley	14 – Miller	7 – Bradley	Coleman Coliseum (8,803); Tuscaloosa, AL
December 28, 2022; 8:00 p.m., SECN	No. 8	at No. 21 Mississippi State	W 78–67	11–2 (1–0)	20 – Sears	11 – Miller	7 – Bradley	Humphrey Coliseum (9,803); Starkville, MS
January 3, 2023; 8:00 p.m., SECN	No. 7	Ole Miss	W 84–62	12–2 (2–0)	17 – Miller	8 – Clowney	3 – Tied	Coleman Coliseum (8,505); Tuscaloosa, AL
January 7, 2023; 12:00 p.m., ESPN	No. 7	Kentucky	W 78–52	13–2 (3–0)	19 – Miller	7 – Miller	4 – Sears	Coleman Coliseum (13,474); Tuscaloosa, AL
January 11, 2023; 6:00 p.m., ESPN2	No. 4	at No. 15 Arkansas	W 84–69	14–2 (4–0)	26 – Sears	6 – Tied	3 – Tied	Bud Walton Arena (19,200); Fayetteville, AR
January 14, 2023; 3:00 p.m., ESPN	No. 4	LSU	W 106–66	15–2 (5–0)	31 – Miller	9 – Miller	6 – Bradley	Coleman Coliseum (13,474); Tuscaloosa, AL
January 17, 2023; 7:30 p.m., SECN	No. 4	at Vanderbilt	W 78–66	16–2 (6–0)	30 – Miller	10 – Miller	3 – Tied	Memorial Gymnasium (10,517); Nashville, TN
January 21, 2023; 5:00 p.m., SECN	No. 4	at Missouri	W 85–64	17–2 (7–0)	17 – Tied	14 – Clowney	3 – Tied	Mizzou Arena (15,061); Columbia, MO
January 25, 2023; 8:00 p.m., SECN	No. 2	Mississippi State	W 66–63	18–2 (8–0)	14 – Quinerly	8 – Clowney	4 – Quinerly	Coleman Coliseum (11,681); Tuscaloosa, AL
January 28, 2023*; 1:00 p.m., ESPN	No. 2	at Oklahoma; Big 12/SEC Challenge	L 69–93	18–3	15 – Griffen	8 – Clowney	3 – Miller	Lloyd Noble Center (10,869); Norman, OK
January 31, 2023; 7:30 p.m., SECN	No. 4	Vanderbilt	W 101–44	19–3 (9–0)	22 – Miller	8 – Miller	8 – Sears	Coleman Coliseum (9,513); Tuscaloosa, AL
February 4, 2023; 3:00 p.m., ESPNU	No. 4	at LSU	W 79–69	20–3 (10–0)	14 – Tied	10 – Miller	6 – Quinerly	Pete Maravich Assembly Center (9,652); Baton Rouge, LA
February 8, 2023; 8:00 p.m., ESPN2	No. 3	Florida	W 97–69	21–3 (11–0)	24 – Miller	9 – Miller	5 – Tied	Coleman Coliseum (10,599); Tuscaloosa, AL
February 11, 2023; 1:00 p.m., ESPN	No. 3	at Auburn; Rivalry/College GameDay	W 77–69	22–3 (12–0)	16 – Griffen	7 – Clowney	3 – Tied	Neville Arena (9,121); Auburn, AL
February 15, 2023; 6:00 p.m., ESPN2	No. 1	at No. 10 Tennessee	L 59–68	22–4 (12–1)	15 – Miller	11 – Clowney	4 – Bradley	Thompson–Boling Arena (21,678); Knoxville, TN
February 18, 2023; 5:00 p.m., SECN	No. 1	Georgia	W 108–59	23–4 (13–1)	21 – Miller	12 – Pringle	7 – Bradley	Coleman Coliseum (13,474); Tuscaloosa, AL
February 22, 2023; 8:00 p.m., ESPN2	No. 2	at South Carolina	W 78–76 ^{OT}	24–4 (14–1)	41 – Miller	9 – Bediako	3 – Bradley	Colonial Life Arena (11,242); Columbia, SC
February 25, 2023; 1:00 p.m., ESPN2	No. 2	Arkansas	W 86–83	25–4 (15–1)	24 – Miller	13 – Clowney	7 – Quinerly	Coleman Coliseum (13,474); Tuscaloosa, AL
March 1, 2023; 6:00 p.m., ESPN2	No. 2	Auburn; Rivalry	W 90–85 ^{OT}	26–4 (16–1)	24 – Quinerly	8 – Tied	6 – Quinerly	Coleman Coliseum (13,474); Tuscaloosa, AL
March 4, 2023; 11:00 a.m., CBS	No. 2	at No. 24 Texas A&M	L 61–67	26–5 (16–2)	19 – Miller	10 – Miller	3 – Quinerly	Reed Arena (12,989); College Station, TX
SEC tournament
March 10, 2023; 12:00 p.m., ESPN	(1) No. 4	vs. (9) Mississippi State; Quarterfinals	W 72–49	27–5	18 – Miller	9 – Miller	5 – Miller	Bridgestone Arena (16,107); Nashville, TN
March 11, 2023; 12:00 p.m., ESPN	(1) No. 4	vs. (4) No. 25 Missouri; Semifinals	W 72–61	28–5	20 – Miller	12 – Miller	7 – Quinerly	Bridgestone Arena (17,528); Nashville, TN
March 12, 2023; 12:00 p.m., ESPN	(1) No. 4	vs. (2) No. 18 Texas A&M; Championship	W 82–63	29–5	23 – Miller	13 – Bediako	4 – Miller	Bridgestone Arena (18,690); Nashville, TN
NCAA tournament
March 16, 2023*; 1:45 p.m., CBS	(1 S) No. 1	vs. (16 S) Texas A&M–Corpus Christi; First Round	W 96–75	30–5	19 – Pringle	15 – Pringle	6 – Bradley	Legacy Arena (15,126); Birmingham, AL
March 18, 2023*; 8:40 p.m., TBS	(1 S) No. 1	vs. (8 S) Maryland; Second Round	W 73–51	31–5	22 – Quinerly	10 – Bediako	3 – Sears	Legacy Arena (15,198); Birmingham, AL
March 24, 2023*; 5:30 p.m., TBS	(1 S) No. 1	vs. (5 S) No. 18 San Diego State; Sweet Sixteen	L 64–71	31–6	16 – Sears	11 – Miller	3 – Tied	KFC Yum! Center (20,289); Louisville, KY
*Non-conference game. ^{#}Rankings from AP Poll. (#) Tournament seedings in parentheses. S=South. All times are in Central Time.

== Rankings ==
Ranking movements Legend: ██ Increase in ranking ██ Decrease in ranking т = Tied with team above or below ( ) = First-place votes
	Week																			
Poll	Pre	1	2	3	4	5	6	7	8	9	10	11	12	13	14	15	16	17	18	Final
AP	20	18	18	11т	8	4	9	8	7	4	4	2 (23)	4	3 (1)	1 (38)	2 (7)	2 (5)	4	1 (48)	Not released
Coaches	19	16	18	14	10	5	10	9	7	4	4 (1)	2 (8)	5	3 (1)	1 (15)	2 (6)	2 (2)	5	2 (8)	4

*AP does not release post-NCAA Tournament rankings.

== See also ==
- 2022–23 Alabama Crimson Tide women's basketball team
