= Texas A&M Aggies men's basketball =

College basketball team

2026–27 Texas A&M Aggies men's basketball team
- University: Texas A&M University
- First season: 1912–13; 114 years ago
- Athletic director: Trev Alberts
- Head coach: Bucky McMillan; 2nd season, 22–12 (.647)
- Location: College Station, Texas
- Arena: Reed Arena (capacity: 12,989)
- NCAA division: Division I
- Conference: SEC
- Nickname: Aggies
- Colors: Maroon and white
- Student section: Reed Rowdies
- All-time record: 1,565–1,359 (.535)
- NCAA tournament record: 16–18 (.471)

NCAA Division I tournament Sweet Sixteen
- 1951, 1969, 1980, 2007, 2016, 2018

NCAA Division I tournament appearances
- 1951, 1964, 1969, 1975, 1980, 1987, 2006, 2007, 2008, 2009, 2010, 2011, 2016, 2018, 2023, 2024, 2025, 2026

Conference tournament champions
- SWC: 1980, 1987

Conference regular-season champions
- SWC: 1920, 1921, 1922, 1923, 1951, 1964, 1969, 1975, 1976, 1980, 1986 SEC: 2016

Uniforms
Home	Away	Alternate

The Texas A&M Aggies men's basketball team represents Texas A&M University in NCAA Division I college basketball. The Aggies compete in the Southeastern Conference. Since 1998, the teams has played its home games at Reed Arena, a 12,989-capacity arena in College Station, Texas on the campus of Texas A&M University. Texas A&M has appeared in the NCAA tournament 18 times, most recently in 2026.

== History ==
=== Metcalf era ===
Shelby Metcalf took over the A&M basketball program in 1963. His impact was immediate, winning the Southwest Conference with a 13–1 conference record for Texas A&M's first title in 13 years. In his 26 years as head coach at Texas A&M, he won six Southwest Conference titles, two Southwest Conference tournament titles, and led A&M to six NCAA tournament and four NIT appearances. He was fired by former A&M football player and then-athletic director John David Crow after coaching 19 games of the 1989–1990 season. When asked by the media what happened between the two, Metcalf remarked, "I made a comment that I didn't think John David was all that bright. And I thought I was being generous." Metcalf finished his career at A&M with an overall record of 438–306, making him the all-time winningest men's basketball coach in Southwest Conference history.

=== The Dark Ages ===
After Metcalf was fired, A&M went through the next 14 years making only one postseason appearance (1994 NIT), finished above .500 in conference play only twice, and posted an overall record of .500 or above only twice. John Thornton finished out the 1990 season as head coach after Metcalf was fired. Soon after, Kermit Davis Jr. was hired prior to the 1990–91 season, after posting a 50–12 (.806) record in two seasons at Idaho. He resigned after one season at 8–21 and Texas A&M began investigating recruiting violations by Davis. He was soon placed on a two-year probation by the NCAA and coached at a community college in Florida. Tony Barone was hired from Creighton in 1991 to replace Davis. Barone lasted seven years as head coach of the program, finishing below .500 six times. It was in 1994 that he finished with a 10–4 league record for 2nd place in the Southwest Conference and was invited to the NIT. After Barone finished last in the Big 12 Conference in 1998, Melvin Watkins was hired out of UNC-Charlotte. While a good recruiter, Watkins never finished above seventh in the Big 12. He resigned after going winless (0–16) in conference play in 2004.

=== Since 2004 ===
==== Gillispie era ====
After Watkins resigned, Billy Gillispie, was hired out of UTEP after leading the Miners to an NCAA tournament appearance and having the largest turnaround of any team in the nation, from 6–24 in 2002–03 to 24–8 in 2003–04. The Aggies, though picked by Big 12 coaches to finish last in the conference, immediately improved under Gillispie, winning their first 10 games and finishing at 21–10, 8–8 in conference. Along the way, the team defeated ranked, in-state rivals Texas and Texas Tech. The team earned an NIT bid, Texas A&M's first postseason in 11 years, reaching the quarterfinals of the tournament.

Gillispie's second year featured further improvement, with the Aggies defeating three ranked opponents in Colorado, Texas, and Syracuse. The team finished with a league record of 10–6 and a win in the Big 12 tournament, Texas A&M's first since the conference first began play in 1996–97. The Aggies reached the NCAA tournament for the first time since 1987 as a 12-seed, upsetting fifth-seed Syracuse in the first round. The Aggies fell in the second round to LSU on the final shot of the game.

In the 2006–07 season, A&M started ranked at #13. Despite early-season losses to LSU and UCLA, the Aggies were able to secure a win at Allen Fieldhouse over #6 Kansas, a first for a Big 12 South team since the conference was formed. They finished with just three losses in conference play (a sweep by Texas Tech and a double-overtime loss to a Kevin Durant-led Texas in Austin) and were able to secure the #2 seed in the Big 12 tournament. The Aggies lost in the quarterfinals to Oklahoma State. They received a #3 seed in the 2007 NCAA championship tournament, their highest seed ever, and reached the Sweet 16. In the postseason, A&M achieved a #9 ranking by the Associated Press and ESPN/USA Today coaches polls, the highest ranking ever attained in school history. In this season, they were the only program in the Big 12 Conference to have both men's and women's teams competing in the NCAA Tournament – the men as a #3 seed and the women as a #4 seed.

On April 6, 2007, Gillispie resigned his position as head coach at Texas A&M to coach at the University of Kentucky. Four days later, on April 10, Mark Turgeon, head coach of Wichita State University, was announced as the new men's basketball head coach at A&M.

==== Turgeon era ====
Under Turgeon and his staff from 2007 to 2011, the Aggies had their greatest four year win total in program history. The Aggies started the 2007–08 season ranked 14th in the preseason Coaches Poll. Once the season progressed, they won the 2007 NIT Season Tip-Off to extend their winning streak to 7–0. Their first loss of the season came to unranked Arizona. After the Arizona game, they would then win eight straight home games against unranked opponents. Team performance spiraled down once conference play had begun, losing to three straight unranked teams—at Texas Tech, at Michael Beasley-led Kansas State, and at home to Baylor in a 5-overtime classic. The Aggies would post wins at their next five matchups, including one over the 10th-ranked rival Texas Longhorns and three away games. They then regressed, losing to Oklahoma State and Nebraska at home. Another high point came when they defeated Texas Tech 98–54 at home, matching their highest margin of victory in school history (set in 1959 against Texas). The Aggies regressed once again, this time losing 64–37 at Oklahoma. After the blowout, the Aggies were able to revenge Baylor in Waco, though came back home to lose their final regular season game to eventual national champion Kansas to finish the season at 8–8 in conference play. The team received a No. 6 bid to the Big 12 tournament, defeating Iowa State and Kansas State in the first two rounds, but lost to Kansas again in the semifinals. With their 24–10 record after the Big 12 tournament, the Aggies received a No. 9 at-large bid to the West Regional of the NCAA tournament. In the first round, they defeated 8th-seeded BYU 67–62 at Anaheim. In the second round, they faced UCLA at the same site, though allowed them to escape with a close 51–49 win. The Aggies finished the season with a 25–11 record. The 25 wins matches the record for most wins by a first-year coach at a Big 12 school, set by former Texas coach Tom Penders in the 1988–89 season.

The 2008–09 Aggies, led by Turgeon in his second year, went 14–1 in non-conference play, with wins over Alabama, Arizona, and LSU; the one loss was handed to them by Tulsa. Josh Carter and Bryan Davis received preseason Big 12 honorable mention. The team did not make the top 25 of the preseason AP or Coaches polls, though received votes. During the 2009 signing period, the Aggies signed Naji Hibbert, Khris Middleton, Kourtney Roberson, and Ray Turner, all of whom were listed in the Rivals.com Top 150 prospects for the class of 2009. The Aggies went 9–7 in Big 12 play to make the NCAA tournament for the fourth straight year; they defeated BYU in the first round for the second consecutive year before losing to UConn. Josh Carter became an All-Big 12 Third Team selection, while Derrick Roland was selected to the Big 12 All-Defensive Team. The Aggies finished 24–10, giving Turgeon 49 wins over two years.

In the 2009–10 season, the Aggies played a considerably tougher non-conference schedule, going 10–3. Senior guard Derrick Roland broke his leg grotesquely in December and missed the rest of the season. The team was picked to finish fifth in the Big 12 in the preseason coaches' poll but finished tied for second. With their 22–8 regular-season finish and 11–5 mark in conference play, the Aggies participated in the 2010 Big 12 Tournament and defeated Nebraska before losing to No. 1 Kansas in the semifinals. They received an at–large bid to the NCAA tournament and earned a 5 seed in the South Region. They defeated 12 seed Utah State in the first round before falling to 4 seed Purdue in overtime in the second round to finish their season at 24–10. Donald Sloan made All-Big 12 First Team as a senior and Bryan Davis was named to the All-Big 12 Defensive team; they graduated with 100 wins, the most by any class in Aggie basketball history. Turgeon's 73 wins at the conclusion of the season surpassed Gillispie's 70 in three years at A&M.

Prior to the beginning of his last year at Texas A&M, Turgeon had negotiated a contract extension and salary increase, but he was growing more unhappy with the Aggie fanbase. During his final season coaching the Aggies Turgeon publicly express unhappiness with the inconsistent fan support from both students and public ticket holders. On the evening of May 9, 2011 at 8pm (local time), Turgeon met with his coaching staff and players to inform them that half an hour earlier he accepted the head coach position at the University of Maryland. He had visited the campus earlier that day and left with an offer. When asked about his decision at an Aggie Athletics press conference he said "Maryland's got a great basketball tradition. [Texas A&M and Maryland are] real similar. It's a gut feeling." In their meeting earlier that night he told the Aggie players "it was the hardest decision [he] ever had to make... because of [them]." Turgeon said that fan attendance at A&M did not factor into his decision.

==== Kennedy era ====
Following the 2010 season, Mark Turgeon left the Texas Aggies for the University of Maryland, opening the door for Billy Kennedy to become the new head coach of the team. Kennedy, who arrived after coaching at Murray State, was known for his good coaching record for the Racers his final years there.

Kennedy's first three years at Texas A&M began as a slow progression in terms of quality of the teams, going 14-18, 18–15, and 18–16 respectively, with his 3rd year team being invited to the annual end-of-year CBI basketball tournament.

The 2014–15 season saw the Aggies vie for a spot in the NCAA tournament, but the team lost 4 of their last 5 games, so they were instead invited to the NIT. They finished the season with a record of 21–12.

His next year saw one of the best years in Aggie men's basketball in nearly a decade, with the team winning a share the conference regular season title. The Aggies were invited to the NCAA tournament as a 3 seed, and played all the way to the Sweet Sixteen, where they were eventually defeated by Oklahoma, finishing the season with a record of 28–9.

The next year was considered by many to be a rebuilding year, as 4 starting seniors were graduating, with 3 heading for the NBA: Danuel House, Alex Caruso, and Jalen Jones. The team, which was led by mostly sophomores, went on to finish the season with a record of 16–15, and were not invited to any postseason tournaments for the first time since 2013.

The following year, the Aggies returned most of their starters from the previous year, now as mostly juniors, and began the season with a lot of promise, landing a No. 25 spot in the preseason AP poll and reaching as high as No. 5 during the regular season. After a string of injuries and suspensions, the team hobbled to the end of the season, but not without landing a spot in the NCAA tournament. Earning a 7 seed, the team went on to defeat Providence and the defending national champions, North Carolina, to earn a spot in the Sweet Sixteen, their 2nd in 3 years. The team would lose to Michigan in the Sweet Sixteen, and finish the season with a record of 22–13. Sophomore starting center Robert Williams, as well as juniors Tyler Davis and D. J. Hogg would then declare for the NBA draft.

The next year was the worst year the Aggies had under Kennedy as head coach since his first one. The departure of 3 starters to the NBA draft as well as senior Admon Gilder to a season ending illness/injury before the season began did not bode well for the upcoming season. This was further stressed when the only returning starter from the previous season, TJ Starks, got a season-ending injury midway through conference play. With only 7 scholarship players left the Aggies fought hard with the addition of 2 walk-ons taking TJ's place- Mark French and Chris Collins. The Aggies finished the season 14–18. Kennedy was fired following the conclusion of the season.

==== Williams era ====
Following Kennedy's firing by Scott Woodward, the Aggies hired Virginia Tech men's basketball coach Buzz Williams on April 3, 2019, following the Hokies loss to Duke in the Sweet 16 of the 2019 NCAA Division I men's basketball tournament. The Aggies were picked to place 12th in the SEC preseason poll and began the season with a rough stretch, including losses to Temple and Fairfield. However, the team would eventually find its rhythm in its stifling defense, finishing the regular season with an overall record of 16–14, 10–8 in the SEC, the most wins since the 2016 Sweet Sixteen season and placing them in a tie for 6th in the conference. However, before any postseason play could begin, the season was cut short due to the COVID-19 pandemic. The 2020–21 season was marred by injury and illness, finishing with a record of 8–10, 2–8 in SEC play. The 2021–2022 season started with promise as A&M began SEC play 4-0 but hit a rough patch, losing 8 conference games in a row. However, the Aggies would catch fire late in the season, winning 8 of their final 9 games. A&M would enter the SEC Tournament, where they would upset #1 seed and SEC Regular Season Champions Auburn, and an Arkansas team that many considered one of the hottest teams in the country. The Aggies would lose to Tennessee in the tournament final, costing the team a spot in the NCAA tournament. They went on to play for the NIT championship where they lost to Xavier, 73–72.

The following few years would see both consistency and a lack thereof. The 2022–23 team finished the season with a record of 25–10, 15–3 in SEC play, the most conference wins in school history, but was given a lower seed in the NCAA tournament due to losses early in the season to teams such as Murray State and Wofford. They would go on to lose to Penn State in the first round of the tournament. The 2023–24 team had high hopes due to the strong season the prior year, but more inconsistency led to a season record of 21–14, 9–9 in SEC play, and, after defeating Nebraska in the first round, the season ended to a second round defeat in the NCAA tournament to Houston. The 2024–25 team, which would end up being Williams' last, played strong basketball throughout the season until the last few weeks where the team lost 6 of their last 9 games. A final record of 23–11, 11–7 in SEC play, a first-round victory against Yale in the NCAA tournament was all the team would attain before being defeated in the second round by Michigan.

Following their defeat, Williams accepted the head coaching position at Maryland.

==== McMillan era ====
On April 4, 2025, it was announced that the Aggies had hired Samford Bulldogs men's basketball coach Bucky McMillan as the team's next head coach, replacing Buzz Williams. He quickly got into action, signing North Alabama's star guard Jacari Lane and Kansas' Zach Clemence out of the transfer portal, attempting to rebuild a disbanded roster after Williams left the program for Maryland.

=== Top 25 poll finishes ===
The AP Poll first appeared on January 20, 1949, and has since been published continuously. The Coaches' Poll began selecting the top 20 teams on a weekly basis during the 1950–1951 college basketball season. It was initially published by United Press from 1950 through 1990, followed by USA Today/CNN from 1991 through 1996, and USA Today/ESPN from 1997 through 2004, and USA Today from 2005 to the present. In the 1990–1991 basketball season the poll expanded to a top 25, and it has since retained this format. Both polls referred to below are the final regular-season polls; that is, not the final post-tournament polls.

Season	AP rank	Coaches rank
1950–1951	n/a	18
1963–1964	n/a	18
1979–1980	n/a	18
2006–2007	9	9
2009–2010	23	24
2010–2011	24	20
2015–2016	15	15
2017–2018	n/a	24
2022–2023	17	25
2024–2025	14	16

== Postseason ==
=== NCAA tournament results ===
The Aggies have appeared in the NCAA tournament 18 times. Their combined record is 16–19.

Year	Seed	Round	Opponent	Result
1951		Sweet Sixteen	Washington	L 40–62
1964		Round of 25	Texas Western	L 62–68
1969		Round of 25; Sweet Sixteen; Regional 3rd Place Game	Trinity; Drake; Colorado	W 81–66; L 63–81; L 82–97
1975		Round of 32	Cincinnati	L 79–87
1980	#6	Round of 48; Round of 32; Sweet Sixteen	#11 Bradley #3 North Carolina #2 Louisville	W 55–53; W 78–61 ^{2OT} L 55–66 ^{OT}
1987	#12	Round of 64	#5 Duke	L 51–58
2006	#12	First Round; Second Round	#5 Syracuse #4 LSU	W 66–58; L 57–58
2007	#3	First Round; Second Round; Sweet Sixteen	#14 Penn #6 Louisville #2 Memphis	W 68–52; W 72–69; L 64–65
2008	#9	First Round; Second Round	#8 BYU #1 UCLA	W 67–62; L 49–51
2009	#9	First Round; Second Round	#8 BYU #1 Connecticut	W 79–66; L 66–92
2010	#5	First Round; Second Round	#12 Utah State #4 Purdue	W 69–53; L 61–63 ^{OT}
2011	#7	First Round	#10 Florida State	L 50–57
2016	#3	First Round; Second Round; Sweet Sixteen	#14 Green Bay #11 Northern Iowa #2 Oklahoma	W 92–65; W 92–88 ^{2OT} L 63–77
2018	#7	First Round; Second Round; Sweet Sixteen	#10 Providence #2 North Carolina #3 Michigan	W 73–69; W 86–65; L 72–99
2023	#7	First Round	#10 Penn State	L 59–76
2024	#9	First Round; Second Round	#8 Nebraska #1 Houston	W 98–83; L 95–100 ^{OT}
2025	#4	First Round; Second Round	#13 Yale #5 Michigan	W 80–71; L 79–91
2026	#10	First Round; Second Round	#7 Saint Mary's #2 Houston	W 63–50; L 57–88

=== NIT results ===
The Aggies have appeared in the National Invitation Tournament (NIT) eight times. Their combined record is 11–8.

Year	Round	Opponent	Result
1979	First Round; Second Round; Quarterfinals	Lamar; Washington; Purdue	W 79–68; W 67–64; L 68–72
1982	First Round; Second Round; Quarterfinals	Lamar; Washington; Purdue	W 60–58; W 69–65; L 65–69
1985	First Round	New Mexico	L 67–80
1986	First Round	Wyoming	L 70–79
1994	First Round	New Orleans	L 73–79
2005	First Round; Second Round; Quarterfinals	Clemson; DePaul; Saint Joseph's	W 82–74; W 75–72; L 51–58
2015	First Round; Second Round	Montana; Louisiana Tech	W 81–64; L 72–84
2022	First Round; Second Round; Quarterfinals; Semifinals; Final	Alcorn State; Oregon; Wake Forest; Washington State; Xavier	W 74–62; W 75–60; W 67–52; W 72–56; L 72–73

=== CBI results ===
The Aggies have appeared in the College Basketball Invitational (CBI) one time. Their record is 1–1.

Year	Round	Opponent	Result
2014	First Round; Quarterfinals	Wyoming; Illinois State	W 59–43; L 55–62

== Notable former players ==
Name	Class year	Notability	Reference(s)
Walt Davis	1952	Former NBA player	
John Beasley	1966	Former ABA player	
Sonny Parker	1976	Former NBA player	
David Britton	1979	Former NBA player	
R.C. Buford	1980	San Antonio Spurs General Manager	
Doug Lee	1984	Former NBA player	
David Edwards	1994		
Joe Wilbert	1994		
Winston Crite	1987	Former NBA player	
Darryl McDonald	1988	NBL player	
Bernard King	2003	Player for UJAP Quimper 29 Former Big 12 career scoring leader	
Antoine Wright	2006	Former NBA player	
Antanas Kavaliauskas	2007	Lithuanian national basketball team player	
Acie Law IV	2007	Former NBA player	
DeAndre Jordan	2008	NBA player for the New Orleans Pelicans	
Joseph Jones	2008	French League player	
Dominique Kirk	2008	Holds A&M record for games started (132), Plays EuroLeague in Turkey	
Josh Carter	2009	Holds A&M records for games played (135), wins and winning percentage (98–37=.725), 3 point baskets made and was the first Texas A&M player to play in 4 straight NCAA tournaments (9 games)	
Chinemelu Elonu	2010	Italian League Player for Pallacanestro Reggiana	
Khris Middleton	2012	NBA player for the Dallas Mavericks	
Alex Caruso	2016	NBA player for the Oklahoma City Thunder He finished as the school's all-time leader in assists with 649 and steals with 276. As a senior, he earned SEC All-Defensive Team and second-team All-SEC honors	
Danuel House	2016	NBA player for the Philadelphia 76ers	
Robert Williams III	2018	NBA player for the Portland Trail Blazers, 2x SEC Defensive Player of the Year (2017, 2018)	

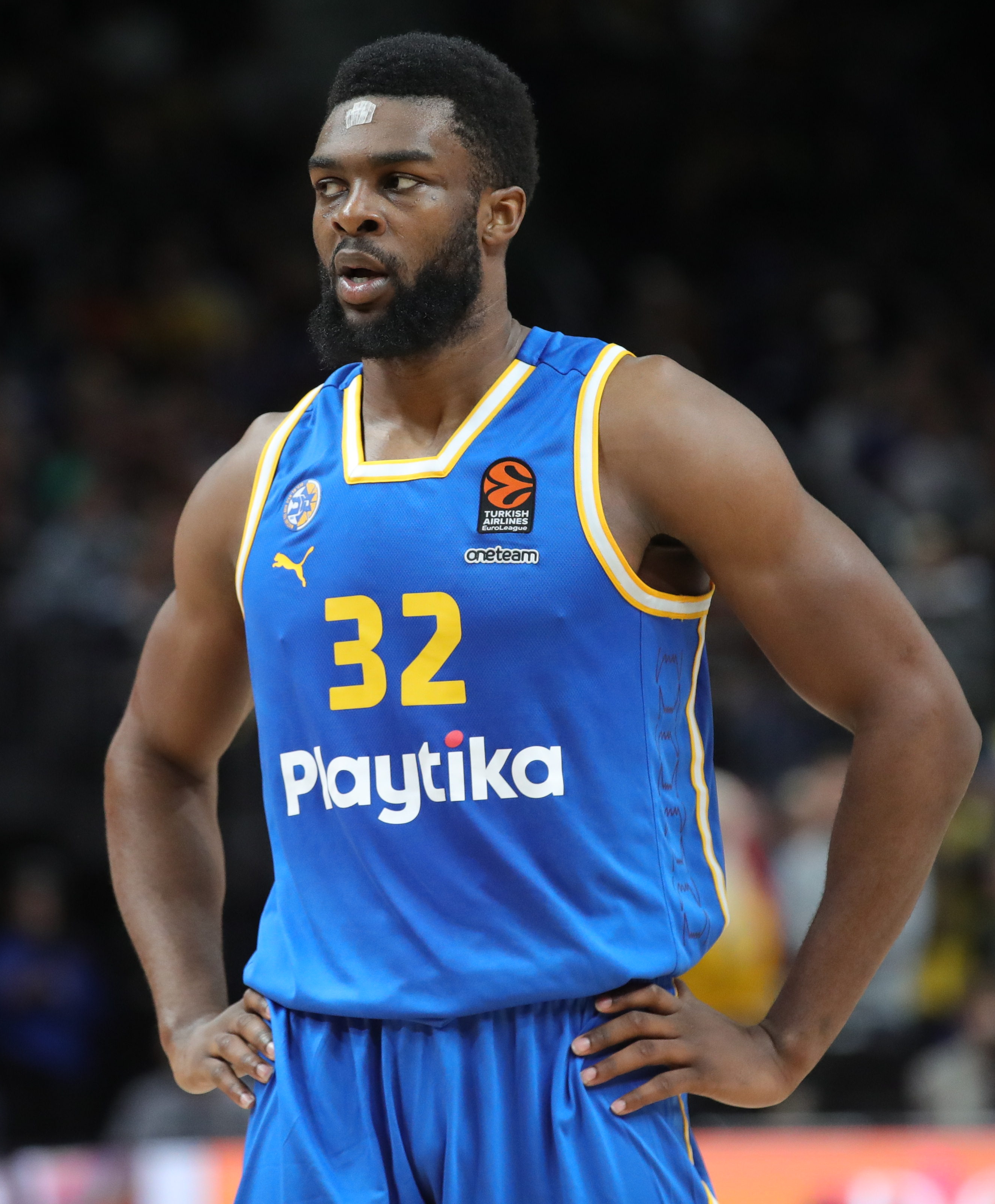
Josh Nebo

- Jalen Jones (born 1993), basketball player for Hapoel Haifa in the Israeli Basketball Premier League
- Josh Nebo (born 1997), basketball player in the Israeli Basketball Premier League
- Tyrece Radford (born 1999), basketball guard in the Israeli Basketball Premier League
- Elijah Thomas (born 1996), basketball player in the Israeli Basketball Premier League
- Marcus Williams (born 2002), basketball player in the Israeli Basketball Premier League

=== Aggies in the NBA ===
==== Management ====
- R. C. Buford – CEO – San Antonio Spurs
- Bryson Graham – Executive Vice-president - Chicago Bulls

==== Current players ====
- DeAndre Jordan — New Orleans Pelicans
- Khris Middleton — Washington Wizards
- Alex Caruso – Oklahoma City Thunder
- Robert Williams – Portland Trail Blazers
- Quenton Jackson – Indiana Pacers

=== Honored jerseys ===
No.	Player	Pos.	Career
1	Acie Law (Note: Law's #1 was put on display at the Aggies arena, but not officially retired by the University so future players can wear it.)	PG	2003–2007
4	Wade Taylor IV	PG	2021–2025

== Records ==
=== Career Points Scored ===
Records accurate as of the 2024-25 season

Position	Name	Points	Seasons
1	Wade Taylor IV	2,058	2021–22 2022–23 2023–24 2024–25
2	Bernard King	1,990	1999–00 2000–01 2001–02 2002–03
3	Vernon Smith	1,778	1977–78 1978–79 1979–80 1980–81
4	Joseph Jones	1,679	2004–05 2005–06 2006–07 2007–08
5	Acie Law IV	1,669	2003–04 2004–05 2005–06 2006–07
6	John Beasley	1,594	1963–64 1964–65 1965–66
7	Winston Crite	1,576	1983–84 1984–85 1985–86 1986–87
8	Josh Carter	1,566	2005–06 2006–07 2007–08 2008–09
9	Donald Sloan	1,522	2006–07 2007–08 2008–09 2009–10
10	Rynn Wright	1,495	1977–78 1978–79 1979–80 1980–81

== Current coaching and support staff ==
- Bucky McMillan – Head Coach
- Mitch Cole – Assistant Coach
- Kyle Keller – Assistant Coach
- Frank Haith – Assistant Coach
- Dale Layer – Special Assistant to the Head Coach

== Regular-season tournaments ==
Texas A&M has played in the following regular-season tournaments since 2006.

Year	Tournament	Location	Record
2006	Shelby Metcalf Classic	College Station TX	3–0
2007	NIT Season Tip-Off	College Station TX, New York City	4–0
2008	South Padre Island Invitational	College Station TX, South Padre Island TX	3–1
2009	76 Classic	Anaheim CA	2–1
2010	Old Spice Classic	Lake Buena Vista FL	2–1
2011	2K Sports Classic	College Station TX, New York City	3–1
2012	CBE Classic	College Station TX, Kansas City MO	3–1
2013	Corpus Christi Challenge	College Station TX, Corpus Christi TX	2–2
2014	Puerto Rico Tipoff	San Juan PR	2–1
2015	Battle 4 Atlantis	College Station TX, Paradise Island	3–1
2016	Wooden Legacy	California	3–1
2017	Legends Classic	Brooklyn, New York	2–0
2018	Vancouver Showcase	British Columbia, Canada	0–2
2019	Orlando Invitational	Orlando, FL	0–3
2021	Maui Invitational	Las Vegas, NV	2–1
2022	Myrtle Beach Invitational	Conway, SC	1–2
2023	ESPN Events Invitational	Orlando, FL	2–1
2024	Players Era Festival	Las Vegas, NV	2–1

== See also ==
Texas A&M Aggies women's basketball
