= List of Texas A&M Aggies men's basketball seasons =

This is a list of seasons completed by the Texas A&M Aggies men's basketball team since its conception in 1912. The list documents season-by-season records, conference standings, NCAA appearances, and championships won.

Texas A&M belonged to the Southwest Conference from 1915–1995 before joining the Big 12 Conference in 1996. Texas A&M has competed in the Southeastern Conference since July 1, 2012. The team has 12 regular-season conference championships, 2 conference tournament championships, and 17 NCAA tournament appearances. They have no NCAA championships.

== Season-by-season results ==
Record table
Season	Coach	Overall	Conference	Standing	Postseason
F.D. Steger (Independent) (1912–1914)
1912–13	F.D. Steger	4–2	—	—	
1913–14	F.D. Steger	5–2	—	—	
F.D. Steger (Southwest Conference) (1914–1915)
1914–15	F.D. Steger	13–2	4–1	3rd	
F.D. Steger:		22–6	4–1		
Tubby Graves (Southwest Conference) (1915–1916)
1915–16	Tubby Graves	11–2	6–2	2nd	
Tubby Graves:		11–2	6–2		
W.H.H. Morris (Southwest Conference) (1916–1917)
1916–17	W.H.H. Morris	11–8	3–3	2nd	
W.H.H. Morris:		11–8	3–3		
Bill Driver (Southwest Conference) (1917–1920)
1917–18	Bill Driver	9–9	7–7	3rd	
1918–19	Bill Driver	14–4	7–3	2nd	
1919–20	Bill Driver	19–0	16–0	1st	
Bill Driver:		42–13	30–10		
Dana X. Bible (Southwest Conference) (1920–1927)
1920–21	Dana X. Bible	16–6	10–2	1st	
1921–22	Dana X. Bible	18–3	13–3	1st	
1922–23	Dana X. Bible	16–4	15–3	1st	
1923–24	Dana X. Bible	13–10	12–11	4th	
1924–25	Dana X. Bible	9–8	6–8	5th	
1925–26	Dana X. Bible	8–9	4–8	6th	
1926–27	Dana X. Bible	10–7	4–6	5th	
Dana X. Bible:		90–47	64–41		
C.F. Bassett (Southwest Conference) (1927–1929)
1927–28	C.F. Bassett	4–12	1–9	7th	
1928–29	C.F. Bassett	12–6	4–6	5th	
C.F. Bassett:		16–18	5–15		
J.B. Reid (Southwest Conference) (1929–1935)
1929–30	J.B. Reid	8–10	4–6	T–4th	
1930–31	J.B. Reid	14–8	5–7	5th	
1931–32	J.B. Reid	10–9	4–8	T–5th	
1932–33	J.B. Reid	9–10	8–4	3rd	
1933–34	J.B. Reid	14–6	7–5	2nd	
1934–35	J.B. Reid	10–10	4–8	T–5th	
J.B. Reid:		65–53	32–38		
H.R. McQuillan (Southwest Conference) (1935–1941)
1935–36	H.R. McQuillan	9–9	3–9	6th	
1936–37	H.R. McQuillan	12–13	5–7	T–5th	
1937–38	H.R. McQuillan	10–8	6–6	4th	
1938–39	H.R. McQuillan	7–16	2–10	6th	
1939–40	H.R. McQuillan	11–11	5–7	T–5th	
1940–41	H.R. McQuillan	7–13	3–9	6th	
H.R. McQuillan:		56–70	24–48		
Marty Karow (Southwest Conference) (1941–1942)
1941–42	Marty Karow	8–16	4–8	6th	
Marty Karow:		8–16	4–8		
Manning Smith (Southwest Conference) (1942–1945)
1942–43	Manning Smith	11–11	4–8	T–5th	
1943–44	Manning Smith	2–15	0–12	7th	
1944–45	Manning Smith	3–18	2–10	6th	
Manning Smith:		16–44	6–30		
Marty Karow (Southwest Conference) (1945–1950)
1945–46	Marty Karow	9–14	4–8	6th	
1946–47	Marty Karow	8–17	4–8	5th	
1947–48	Marty Karow	7–17	2–10	6th	
1948–49	Marty Karow	5–19	2–10	6th	
1949–50	Marty Karow	10–14	6–6	T–4th	
Marty Karow:		39–81	18–42		
John Floyd (Southwest Conference) (1950–1955)
1950–51	John Floyd	17–12	8–4	T–1st	NCAA Sweet Sixteen
1951–52	John Floyd	9–15	5–7	T–3rd	
1952–53	John Floyd	6–15	3–9	7th	
1953–54	John Floyd	2–20	1–11	7th	
1954–55	John Floyd	4–20	1–11	7th	
John Floyd:		38–82	18–42		
Ken Loeffler (Southwest Conference) (1955–1957)
1955–56	Ken Loeffler	6–18	3–9	T–5th	
1956–57	Ken Loeffler	7–17	3–9	T–6th	
Ken Loeffler:		13–35	6–18		
Bob Rogers (Southwest Conference) (1957–1963)
1957–58	Bob Rogers	11–13	7–7	T–5th	
1958–59	Bob Rogers	15–9	6–8	T–5th	
1959–60	Bob Rogers	19–5	10–4	T–2nd	
1960–61	Bob Rogers	16–8	10–4	2nd	
1961–62	Bob Rogers	15–9	9–5	3rd	
1962–63	Bob Rogers	16–8	9–5	T–2nd	
Bob Rogers:		92–52	51–33		
Shelby Metcalf (Southwest Conference) (1963–1990)
1963–64	Shelby Metcalf	18–7	13–1	1st	NCAA University Division First Round
1964–65	Shelby Metcalf	14–10	7–7	4th	
1965–66	Shelby Metcalf	15–9	10–4	2nd	
1966–67	Shelby Metcalf	6–18	5–9	6th	
1967–68	Shelby Metcalf	14–10	8–6	T–2nd	
1968–69	Shelby Metcalf	18–9	12–2	1st	NCAA University Division Sweet Sixteen
1969–70	Shelby Metcalf	14–10	9–5	2nd	
1970–71	Shelby Metcalf	9–17	5–9	7th	
1971–72	Shelby Metcalf	16–10	9–5	T–3rd	
1972–73	Shelby Metcalf	17–9	9–5	T–2nd	
1973–74	Shelby Metcalf	15–11	7–7	4th	
1974–75	Shelby Metcalf	20–7	12–2	1st	NCAA Division I First Round
1975–76	Shelby Metcalf	21–6	14–2	1st	
1976–77	Shelby Metcalf	14–14	8–8	T–4th	
1977–78	Shelby Metcalf	12–15	5–11	7th	
1978–79	Shelby Metcalf	24–9	11–5	3rd	NIT Quarterfinal
1979–80	Shelby Metcalf	26–8	14–2	1st	NCAA Division I Sweet Sixteen
1980–81	Shelby Metcalf	15–12	8–8	T–4th	
1981–82	Shelby Metcalf	20–11	10–6	3rd	NIT Quarterfinal
1982–83	Shelby Metcalf	17–14	10–6	3rd	
1983–84	Shelby Metcalf	16–14	7–9	5th	
1984–85	Shelby Metcalf	19–11	10–6	T–2nd	NIT First Round
1985–86	Shelby Metcalf	20–12	12–4	T–1st	NIT First Round
1986–87	Shelby Metcalf	17–14	6–10	8th	NCAA Division I First Round
1987–88	Shelby Metcalf	16–15	8–8	6th	
1988–89	Shelby Metcalf	16–14	8–8	T–4th	
1989–90	Shelby Metcalf; John Thornton^{[Note A]}	14–17	7–9	T–5th	
Shelby Metcalf:		438–306	239–158		
Kermit Davis (Southwest Conference) (1990–1991)
1990–91	Kermit Davis	8–21	2–14	9th	
Kermit Davis:		8–21	2–14		
Tony Barone (Southwest Conference) (1991–1996)
1991–92	Tony Barone	6–22	2–12	8th	
1992–93	Tony Barone	10–17	5–9	6th	
1993–94	Tony Barone	19–11	10–4	T–2nd	NIT First Round
1994–95	Tony Barone	14–16	7–7	5th	
1995–96	Tony Barone	11–16	3–11	T–7th	
Tony Barone (Big 12 Conference) (1996–1998)
1996–97	Tony Barone	9–18	3–13	T–10th	
1997–98	Tony Barone	7–20	1–15	12th	
Tony Barone:		76–120	31–71		
Melvin Watkins (Big 12 Conference) (1998–2004)
1998–99	Melvin Watkins	12–15	5–11	T–10th	
1999–00	Melvin Watkins	8–20	4–12	T–8th	
2000–01	Melvin Watkins	10–20	3–13	T–11th	
2001–02	Melvin Watkins	10–22	3–13	T–10th	
2002–03	Melvin Watkins	14–14	6–10	T–7th	
2003–04	Melvin Watkins	7–21	0–16	12th	
Melvin Watkins:		61–112	21–75		
Billy Gillispie (Big 12 Conference) (2004–2007)
2004–05	Billy Gillispie	21–10	8–8	7th	NIT Quarterfinal
2005–06	Billy Gillispie	22–9	10–6	4th	NCAA Division I Second Round
2006–07	Billy Gillispie	27–7	13–3	2nd	NCAA Division I Sweet Sixteen
Billy Gillispie:		70–26	31–17		
Mark Turgeon (Big 12 Conference) (2007–2011)
2007–08	Mark Turgeon	25–11	8–8	6th	NCAA Division I Second Round
2008–09	Mark Turgeon	24–10	9–7	4th	NCAA Division I Second Round
2009–10	Mark Turgeon	24–10	11–5	T–2nd	NCAA Division I Second Round
2010–11	Mark Turgeon	24–9	11–5	T–3rd	NCAA Division I First Round
Mark Turgeon:		97–40	39–25		
Billy Kennedy (Big 12 Conference) (2011–2012)
2011–12	Billy Kennedy	14–18	4–14	9th	
Billy Kennedy (Southeastern Conference) (2012–2019)
2012–13	Billy Kennedy	18–15	7–11	11th	
2013–14	Billy Kennedy	18–16	8–10	9th	CBI Second Round
2014–15	Billy Kennedy	21–12	11–7	T–3rd	NIT Second Round
2015–16	Billy Kennedy	28–9	13–5	T–1st	NCAA Division I Sweet Sixteen
2016–17	Billy Kennedy	16–15	8–10	T–9th	
2017–18	Billy Kennedy	22–13	9–9	T–7th	NCAA Division I Sweet Sixteen
2018–19	Billy Kennedy	14–17	6–12	11th	
Billy Kennedy:		151–114	66–78		
Buzz Williams (Southeastern Conference) (2019–2025)
2019–20	Buzz Williams	16–14	10–8	T–6th	No postseason held
2020–21	Buzz Williams	8–10	2–8	13th	
2021–22	Buzz Williams	27–13	9–9	T–5th	NIT Runner-Up
2022–23	Buzz Williams	25–10	15–3	2nd	NCAA Division I First Round
2023–24	Buzz Williams	21–15	9–9	T–7th	NCAA Division I Second Round
2024–25	Buzz Williams	23–11	11–7	5th	NCAA Division I Second Round
Buzz Williams:		120–73	56–44		
Bucky McMillan (Southeastern Conference) (2025–present)
2025–26	Bucky McMillan	22–12	11–7	T–4th	NCAA Division I Second Round
Bucky McMillan:		22–12	11–7		
Total:		1,544–1,348			

National champion Postseason invitational champion
Conference regular season champion Conference regular season and conference tournament champion
Division regular season champion Division regular season and conference tournament champion
Conference tournament champion

=== Notes ===
- ^A. Metcalf coached the first 19 games, going 9–10 and 2–3 in conference. Thornton finished the season, going 5–7 and 5–6 in conference.
