= List of Texas A&M Aggies men's basketball head coaches =

The following is a list of Texas A&M Aggies men's basketball head coaches. The Aggies have had 22 coaches in their 117-season history.

Texas A&M's current head coach is Bucky McMillian.

No.	Tenure	Coach	Years	Record	Pct.
1	1912–1915	F.D. Steger	3	22–6	.786
2	1915–1916	Tubby Graves	1	11–2	.846
3	1916–1917	W.H.H. Morris	1	11–8	.579
4	1917–1920	Bill Driver	3	42–13	.764
5	1920–1927	Dana X. Bible	7	90–47	.657
6	1927–1929	Charles Bassett	2	16–18	.471
7	1929–1935	John B. Reid	6	66–52	.559
8	1935–1941	Herb McQuillan	6	56–71	.441
9	1941–1942 (Note: Karow left A&M to serve in the U.S. Navy during World War II. Smith was a football assistant coach at A&M at the time.); 1945–1950	Marty Karow	6	47–97	.326
10	1942–1945	Manning Smith	3	16–44	.267
11	1950–1955	John Floyd	5	38–82	.317
12	1955–1957	Ken Loeffler	2	13–35	.271
13	1957–1963	Bob Rogers	6	92–52	.639
14	1963–1990 (Note: Metcalf was fired midway through the season. Thornton was an assistant coach with the team.)	Shelby Metcalf	26 1/2	438–306	.589
15	1990	John Thornton (interim)	1/2	5–7	.417
16	1990–1991	Kermit Davis Jr.	1	8–21	.276
17	1991–1998	Tony Barone	7	76–120	.388
18	1998–2004	Melvin Watkins	6	60–112	.349
19	2004–2007	Billy Gillispie	3	70–26	.729
20	2007–2011	Mark Turgeon	4	97–40	.708
21	2011–2019	Billy Kennedy	8	151–116	.566
22	2019–2025	Buzz Williams	6	104–64	.619
23	2025–present	Bucky McMillan	0	0–0	–
Totals		23 coaches	111 seasons	1,528–1,339	.533
Records updated through end of 2024–25 season Source
