= 1980–81 SMU Mustangs men's basketball team =

American college basketball season

1980–81 SMU Mustangs men's basketball
- Conference: Southwest Conference
- Record: 7–20 (3–13 SWC)
- Head coach: Dave Bliss (1st season)
- Home arena: Moody Coliseum

1980–81 Southwest Conference men's basketball standings
	Conf.				Overall
Team	W		L	PCT	W		L	PCT
No. 20 Arkansas	13	–	3	.813	24	–	8	.750
Houston †	10	–	6	.625	21	–	9	.700
Baylor	10	–	6	.625	15	–	12	.556
Texas Tech	8	–	8	.500	15	–	13	.536
Texas A&M	8	–	8	.500	15	–	12	.556
Texas	7	–	9	.438	15	–	15	.500
Rice	7	–	9	.438	12	–	15	.444
TCU	6	–	10	.375	11	–	18	.379
SMU	3	–	13	.188	7	–	20	.259
† 1981 SWC tournament winner Rankings from AP poll

The 1980–81 SMU Mustangs men's basketball team represented Southern Methodist University during the 1980–81 men's college basketball season.

== Schedule ==
Date time, TV	Rank^{#}	Opponent^{#}	Result	Record	Site city, state
November 29*		Southwestern	W 68–52	1–0	Moody Coliseum; University Park, Texas
December 1*		Texas A&I	W 49–47	2–0	Moody Coliseum; University Park, Texas
December 3*		at North Texas	L 66–69	2–1	UNT Coliseum; Denton, Texas
December 6*		at Penn State	L 50–72	2–2	Rec Hall; University Park, Pennsylvania
December 9*		Iowa State	W 58–55	3–2	Moody Coliseum; University Park, Texas
December 13*		Rollins	L 64–73	3–3	Moody Coliseum; University Park, Texas
December 18*		Texas Wesleyan	L 83–84	3–4	Moody Coliseum; University Park, Texas
December 20*		Texas-Arlington	L 56–78	3–5	Moody Coliseum; University Park, Texas
December 22*		Kansas	L 62–73	3–6	Moody Coliseum; University Park, Texas
December 30*		vs. Cornell	W 67–42	4–6	Riverfront Coliseum; Cincinnati, Ohio
January 3		Arkansas	L 50–92	4–7 (0–1)	Moody Coliseum; University Park, Texas
January 6		at Texas	W 53–51 ^{OT}	5–7 (1–1)	Frank Erwin Center; Austin, Texas
January 10		Baylor	L 46–51	5–8 (1–2)	Moody Coliseum; University Park, Texas
January 13		Houston	W 72–70 ^{OT}	6–8 (2–2)	Moody Coliseum; University Park, Texas
January 17		at Texas A&M	L 51–71	6–9 (2–3)	G. Rollie White Coliseum; College Station, Texas
January 20		at TCU	L 43–52	6–10 (2–4)	Daniel-Meyer Coliseum; Fort Worth, Texas
January 24		Rice	L 59–60	6–11 (2–5)	Moody Coliseum; University Park, Texas
January 26		at Texas Tech	W 58–48	7–11 (3–5)	Lubbock Municipal Coliseum; Lubbock, Texas
January 31		Texas	L 63–83	7–12 (3–6)	Moody Coliseum; University Park, Texas
February 3		at Houston	L 64–79	7–13 (3–7)	Hofheinz Pavilion; Houston, Texas
February 7		at Baylor	L 52–80	7–14 (3–8)	Heart O' Texas Coliseum; Waco, Texas
February 10		Texas A&M	L 56–61	7–15 (3–9)	Moody Coliseum; University Park, Texas
February 14		TCU	L 44–52	7–16 (3–10)	Moody Coliseum; University Park, Texas
February 17		at Rice	L 62–70	7–17 (3–11)	Tudor Fieldhouse; Houston, Texas
February 21		Texas Tech	L 48–51	7–18 (3–12)	Moody Coliseum; University Park, Texas
February 24		at Arkansas	L 33–47	7–19 (3–13)	Barnhill Arena; Fayetteville, Arkansas
Southwest tournament
March 5		at Texas Tech	L 58–80	7–20 (3–13)	Lubbock Municipal Coliseum; Lubbock, Texas
*Non-conference game. ^{#}Rankings from AP Poll. (#) Tournament seedings in parentheses. All times are in Central Time.
