= 1979–80 Baylor Bears basketball team =

American college basketball season

1979–80 Baylor Bears men's basketball
- Conference: Southwest Conference
- Record: 11–16 (6–10 SWC)
- Head coach: Jim Haller
- Home arena: Heart O' Texas Coliseum

1979–80 Southwest Conference men's basketball standings
	Conf.				Overall
Team	W		L	PCT	W		L	PCT
Texas A&M †	14	–	2	.875	26	–	8	.765
Arkansas	13	–	3	.813	21	–	8	.724
Texas	10	–	6	.625	19	–	11	.633
Texas Tech	8	–	8	.500	16	–	13	.552
Houston	8	–	8	.500	14	–	14	.500
SMU	7	–	9	.438	16	–	12	.571
Baylor	6	–	10	.375	11	–	16	.407
Rice	4	–	12	.250	7	–	19	.269
TCU	2	–	14	.125	7	–	19	.269
† 1980 SWC tournament winner Rankings from AP Poll

The 1979–80 Baylor Bears men's basketball team represented Baylor University during the 1979–80 men's college basketball season.

== Schedule ==
Date time, TV	Rank^{#}	Opponent^{#}	Result	Record	Site city, state
December 1*		at BYU	L 58–100	0–1	Marriott Center; Provo, Utah
December 3*		at UTEP	L 64–81	0–2	Don Haskins Center; El Paso, Texas
December 5*		New Mexico State	L 71–75	0–3	Heart O' Texas Coliseum; Waco, Texas
December 8*		at Kentucky	L 46–80	0–4	Rupp Arena; Lexington, Kentucky
December 11*		McMurry	W 83–69	1–4	Heart O' Texas Coliseum; Waco, Texas
December 15*		Oklahoma City	W 102–92	2–4	Heart O' Texas Coliseum; Waco, Texas
December 17*		Trinity	W 84–48	3–4	Heart O' Texas Coliseum; Waco, Texas
December 21*		vs. Louisiana	L 83–96	3–5	Blackham Coliseum; Lafayette, Louisiana
December 22*		vs. Long Beach State	W 87–80	4–5	Blackham Coliseum; Lafayette, Louisiana
December 29*		Davidson	W 76–67	5–5	Heart O' Texas Coliseum; Waco, Texas
January 5		at Texas A&M	L 57–74	5–6 (0–1)	G. Rollie White Coliseum; College Station, Texas
January 8		SMU	L 72–78	5–7 (0–2)	Heart O' Texas Coliseum; Waco, Texas
January 12		Rice	W 73–63	6–7 (1–2)	Heart O' Texas Coliseum; Waco, Texas
January 15		at Arkansas	L 57–71	6–8 (1–3)	Barnhill Arena; Fayetteville, Arkansas
January 19		at Texas Tech	L 67–69	6–9 (1–4)	Lubbock Municipal Coliseum; Lubbock, Texas
January 22		Texas	W 62–48	7–9 (2–4)	Heart O' Texas Coliseum; Waco, Texas
January 26		at Houston	L 71–82	7–10 (2–5)	Hofheinz Pavilion; Houston, Texas
January 28		TCU	W 85–73	8–10 (3–5)	Heart O' Texas Coliseum; Waco, Texas
January 30		Texas A&M	L 50–59	8–11 (3–6)	Heart O' Texas Coliseum; Waco, Texas
February 2		at Rice	W 60–57	9–11 (4–6)	Tudor Fieldhouse; Houston, Texas
February 4		at SMU	L 69–73	9–12 (4–7)	Moody Coliseum; University Park, Texas
February 7		Arkansas	L 51–70	9–13 (4–8)	Heart O' Texas Coliseum; Waco, Texas
February 9		Texas Tech	W 79–56	10–13 (5–8)	Heart O' Texas Coliseum; Waco, Texas
February 12		at Texas	L 61–99	10–14 (5–9)	Frank Erwin Center; Austin, Texas
February 16		Houston	L 58–60	10–15 (5–10)	Heart O' Texas Coliseum; Waco, Texas
February 22		at TCU	W 67–59	11–15 (6–10)	Daniel-Meyer Coliseum; Fort Worth, Texas
Southwest tournament
February 25	(7)	at (6) SMU; First round	L 83–86	11–16	Moody Coliseum; University Park, Texas
*Non-conference game. ^{#}Rankings from AP Poll. (#) Tournament seedings in parentheses.
