= 1979–80 SMU Mustangs men's basketball team =

American college basketball season

1979–80 SMU Mustangs men's basketball
- Conference: Southwest Conference
- Record: 16–12 (7–9 SWC)
- Head coach: Sonny Allen (5th season)
- Home arena: Moody Coliseum

1979–80 Southwest Conference men's basketball standings
	Conf.				Overall
Team	W		L	PCT	W		L	PCT
Texas A&M †	14	–	2	.875	26	–	8	.765
Arkansas	13	–	3	.813	21	–	8	.724
Texas	10	–	6	.625	19	–	11	.633
Texas Tech	8	–	8	.500	16	–	13	.552
Houston	8	–	8	.500	14	–	14	.500
SMU	7	–	9	.438	16	–	12	.571
Baylor	6	–	10	.375	11	–	16	.407
Rice	4	–	12	.250	7	–	19	.269
TCU	2	–	14	.125	7	–	19	.269
† 1980 SWC tournament winner Rankings from AP Poll

The 1979–80 SMU Mustangs men's basketball team represented Southern Methodist University during the 1979–80 men's college basketball season. This was Sonny Allen's final year as head coach at SMU. The Mustangs finished with a record of 16–12 overall, and 7–9 in their conference.

== Roster ==
1979–80 SMU Mustangs men's basketball team
Players	Coaches
Pos. / # / Name / Height / Weight / Year / Hometown; F / / Brad Branson / 6 ft 10 in (2.08 m) / 220 lb (100 kg) / Sr / North Fort Myers, Florida	Head coach: Sonny Allen; Assistant coach(es) Legend: (C) Team captain; (S) Suspended; (I) Ineligible; (W) Walk-on; Injured; Current redshirt

== Schedule ==
Date time, TV	Rank^{#}	Opponent^{#}	Result	Record	Site city, state
December 1*		Tulane	W 78–68	1–0	Moody Coliseum; University Park, Texas
December 3*		Texas Lutheran	W 123–91	2–0	Moody Coliseum; University Park, Texas
December 5*		Kansas	W 89–88	3–0	Moody Coliseum; University Park, Texas
December 8*		Colorado	W 86–65	4–0	Moody Coliseum; University Park, Texas
December 15*		Texas Arlington	W 77–76	5–0	Moody Coliseum; University Park, Texas
December 17*		Georgia State	W 119–92	6–0	Moody Coliseum; University Park, Texas
December 19*		Texas Wesleyan	W 112–85	7–0	Moody Coliseum; University Park, Texas
December 21*		vs. Purdue	L 60–85	7–1	Rupp Arena; Lexington, Kentucky
December 22*		vs. California	W 97–88	8–1	Rupp Arena; Lexington, Kentucky
December 29*		at Vanderbilt	L 77–88	8–2	Memorial Gymnasium; Nashville, Tennessee
January 3		at Arkansas	L 69–84	8–3 (0–1)	Barnhill Arena; Fayetteville, Arkansas
January 5		Texas	L 75–85	8–4 (0–2)	Moody Coliseum; University Park, Texas
January 8		at Baylor	W 78–72	9–4 (1–2)	Heart O' Texas Coliseum; Waco, Texas
January 12		at Houston	L 81–96	9–5 (1–3)	Hofheinz Pavilion; Houston, Texas
January 15		Texas A&M	L 56–63	9–6 (1–4)	Moody Coliseum; University Park, Texas
January 19		TCU	L 89–92	9–7 (1–5)	Moody Coliseum; University Park, Texas
January 22		at Rice	W 85–83	10–7 (2–5)	Tudor Fieldhouse; Houston, Texas
January 26		Texas Tech	W 76–75	11–7 (3–5)	Moody Coliseum; University Park, Texas
January 30		at Texas	L 80–113	11–8 (3–6)	Frank Erwin Center; Austin, Texas
February 2		Houston	L 70–71	11–9 (3–7)	Moody Coliseum; University Park, Texas
February 4		Baylor	W 73–69	12–9 (4–7)	Moody Coliseum; University Park, Texas
February 6		at Texas A&M	L 56–67	12–10 (4–8)	G. Rollie White Coliseum; College Station, Texas
February 9		at TCU	W 76–57	13–10 (5–8)	Daniel-Meyer Coliseum; Fort Worth, Texas
February 12		Rice	W 82–81	14–10 (6–8)	Moody Coliseum; University Park, Texas
February 16		at Texas Tech	L 59–62	14–11 (6–9)	Lubbock Municipal Coliseum; Lubbock, Texas
February 19		Arkansas	W 62–58	15–11 (7–9)	Moody Coliseum; University Park, Texas
Southwest tournament
February 25		vs. Baylor	W 86–83	16–11 (7–9)	HemisFair Arena; San Antonio, Texas
February 26		vs. Texas Tech	L 65–73	16–12 (7–9)	HemisFair Arena; San Antonio, Texas
*Non-conference game. ^{#}Rankings from AP Poll. (#) Tournament seedings in parentheses.

== Team players drafted into the NBA ==
Round	Pick	Player	NBA Club
2	45	Brad Branson	Detroit Pistons
