= 1990–91 Arkansas Razorbacks men's basketball team =

American college basketball season

1990–91 Arkansas Razorbacks men's basketball

SWC tournament champions SWC regular season champions

NCAA tournament, Elite Eight
- Conference: Southwest Conference

Ranking
- Coaches: No. 2
- AP: No. 2
- Record: 34–4 (15–1 SWC)
- Head coach: Nolan Richardson (6th season)
- Assistant coaches: Mike Anderson; Scott Edgar
- Home arena: Barnhill Arena

1990–91 Southwest Conference men's basketball standings
	Conf.				Overall
Team	W		L	PCT	W		L	PCT
No. 2 Arkansas †	15	–	1	.938	34	–	4	.895
No. 23 Texas	13	–	3	.813	23	–	9	.719
Houston	10	–	6	.625	18	–	11	.621
TCU	9	–	7	.563	18	–	10	.643
Rice	9	–	7	.563	16	–	14	.533
SMU	6	–	10	.375	12	–	17	.414
Baylor	4	–	12	.250	12	–	15	.444
Texas Tech	4	–	12	.250	8	–	23	.258
Texas A&M	2	–	14	.125	8	–	21	.276
† 1991 SWC tournament winner Rankings from AP Poll

The 1990–91 Arkansas Razorbacks men's basketball team represented the University of Arkansas in the 1990–91 college basketball season. The head coach was Nolan Richardson, serving for his sixth year. The team played its home games in Barnhill Arena in Fayetteville, Arkansas. This was Arkansas's final season in the Southwest Conference. The school joined the Southeastern Conference the next season. The Hogs won their third straight, and final, SWC regular season and conference tournament championships. Arkansas was the #1 seed in the Southeast Regional of the NCAA tournament, and defeated Georgia State, Arizona State, and Alabama, before losing to the Kansas Jayhawks in the Elite Eight.

== Roster ==
1990–91 Arkansas Razorbacks men's basketball team
Players
Coaches

Pos.	#	Name	Height	Weight	Year	Hometown
G	10	Todd Day	6 ft 8 in (2.03 m)	188 lb (85 kg)	Jr	Memphis, Tennessee
G	11	Lee Mayberry	6 ft 2 in (1.88 m)	170 lb (77 kg)	Jr	Tulsa, Oklahoma
C	25	Oliver Miller	6 ft 9 in (2.06 m)	260 lb (118 kg)	Jr	Fort Worth, Texas
F	35	Isaiah Morris	6 ft 8 in (2.03 m)	220 lb (100 kg)	Jr	Richmond, Virginia
F	31	Ron Huery	6 ft 6 in (1.98 m)	200 lb (91 kg)	RS Sr	Memphis, Tennessee
G	20	Arlyn Bowers	5 ft 10 in (1.78 m)	165 lb (75 kg)	Sr	Memphis, Tennessee
F	34	Roosevelt Wallace	6 ft 7 in (2.01 m)	235 lb (107 kg)	RS Jr	Cleveland, Ohio
G	14	Ernie Murray	6 ft 1 in (1.85 m)	174 lb (79 kg)	Sr	Wabbaseka, Arkansas
F	23	Ken Biley	6 ft 6 in (1.98 m)	207 lb (94 kg)	Fr	Pine Bluff, Arkansas
F	33	Clyde Fletcher	6 ft 7 in (2.01 m)	209 lb (95 kg)	RS Jr	Memphis, Tennessee
C	44	Shawn Davis	6 ft 9 in (2.06 m)	215 lb (98 kg)	Jr	Maud, Texas
G/F	21	Darrell Hawkins (injured) (redshirt)	6 ft 5 in (1.96 m)	200 lb (91 kg)	Jr	Prairie View, Texas
G	22	Davor Rimac (redshirt)	6 ft 7 in (2.01 m)	210 lb (95 kg)	Fr	Zagreb, Croatia
G	15	Shawn Perceful (DNP, W)	—	—		Fayetteville, Arkansas
G/F	3	Warren Linn (injured)	6 ft 5 in (1.96 m)	185 lb (84 kg)	So	Tulsa, Oklahoma
F	24	Ray Biggers (redshirt)	6 ft 8 in (2.03 m)	200 lb (91 kg)	Fr	Houston, Texas

Head coach

- Nolan Richardson (UTEP)

Assistant coach(es)

Legend

- (C) Team captain
- (S) Suspended
- (I) Ineligible
- (W) Walk-on
- Injured
- Current redshirt

Roster
Last update: 2022 01 22

== Schedule and results ==
Date time, TV	Rank^{#}	Opponent^{#}	Result	Record	Site city, state
Exhibition Games
November 8, 1990*		Arkansas Express	W 82-69	0–0	Barnhill Arena; Fayetteville, AR
November 11, 1990*		Czechoslovakia	W 110-52	0–0	Barton Coliseum; Little Rock, AR
Regular season
Nov 14, 1990*	No. 2	Vanderbilt; Preseason NIT	W 107–70	1–0	Barnhill Arena; Fayetteville, AR
Nov 16, 1990*	No. 2	No. 15 Oklahoma; Preseason NIT (Quarterfinals)	W 110–88	2–0	Barnhill Arena; Fayetteville, AR
Nov 21, 1990*	No. 2	vs. No. 6 Duke; Preseason NIT (Semifinals)	W 98–88	3–0	Madison Square Garden; New York, NY
Nov 23, 1990*	No. 2	vs. No. 3 Arizona; Preseason NIT (Championship)	L 77–89	3–1	Madison Square Garden; New York, NY
Nov 27, 1990*	No. 3	Mississippi College	W 96–57	4–1	Pine Bluff Convention Center; Pine Bluff, AR
Dec 1, 1990*	No. 3	Kansas State	W 112–88	5–1	Barnhill Arena; Fayetteville, AR
Dec 5, 1990*	No. 3	Louisiana Tech	W 114–97	6–1	Barnhill Arena; Fayetteville, AR
Dec 8, 1990*	No. 3	at Missouri	W 95–82	7–1	Hearnes Center; Columbia, MO
Dec 11, 1990*	No. 2	South Alabama	W 101–91	8–1	Barnhill Arena; Fayetteville, AR
Dec 22, 1990*	No. 2	at Oregon	W 71–68	9–1	McArthur Court; Eugene, OR
Dec 29, 1990*	No. 2	Jackson State	W 126–88	10–1	Barnhill Arena; Fayetteville, AR
Dec 31, 1990*	No. 2	Northeast Louisiana	W 114–92	11–1	Pine Bluff Convention Center; Pine Bluff, AR
Jan 2, 1991*	No. 2	at Rice	W 86–62	12–1 (1–0)	Tudor Fieldhouse; Houston, TX
Jan 6, 1991*	No. 2	Houston	W 95–79	13–1 (2–0)	Barnhill Arena; Fayetteville, AR
Jan 10, 1991*	No. 2	Texas	W 101–89	14–1 (3–0)	Barnhill Arena; Fayetteville, AR
Jan 12, 1991*	No. 2	at Texas Tech	W 113–86	15–1 (4–0)	Lubbock Municipal Coliseum; Lubbock, TX
Jan 15, 1991*	No. 2	at TCU	W 93–73	16–1 (5–0)	Daniel-Meyer Coliseum; Fort Worth, TX
Jan 19, 1991*	No. 2	SMU	W 98–70	17–1 (6–0)	Barnhill Arena; Fayetteville, AR
Jan 21, 1991*	No. 2	at Florida State	W 109–92	18–1	Donald L. Tucker Center; Tallahassee, FL
Jan 23, 1991*	No. 2	Texas A&M	W 113–88	19–1 (7–0)	Barnhill Arena; Fayetteville, AR
Jan 26, 1991*	No. 2	at Baylor	W 73–68	20–1 (8–0)	Ferrell Center; Waco, TX
Jan 30, 1991*	No. 2	UAB	W 104–72	21–1	Barnhill Arena; Fayetteville, AR
Feb 2, 1991*	No. 2	Rice	W 100–87	22–1 (9–0)	Barnhill Arena; Fayetteville, AR
Feb 7, 1991	No. 2	at Houston	W 81–74	23–1 (10–0)	Hofheinz Pavilion; Houston, TX
Feb 10, 1991*	No. 2	No. 1 UNLV	L 105–112	23–2	Barnhill Arena; Fayetteville, AR
Feb 13, 1991*	No. 3	Texas Tech	W 87–69	24–2 (11–0)	Barnhill Arena; Fayetteville, AR
Feb 16, 1991*	No. 3	TCU	W 97–61	25–2 (12–0)	Barnhill Arena; Fayetteville, AR
Feb 20, 1991*	No. 3	at SMU	W 79–70	26–2 (13–0)	Moody Coliseum; Dallas, TX
Feb 23, 1991*	No. 3	at Texas A&M	W 111–72	27–2 (14–0)	G. Rollie White Coliseum; College Station, TX
Feb 26, 1991	No. 3	Baylor	W 106–74	28–2 (15–0)	Barnhill Arena; Fayetteville, AR
Mar 3, 1991	No. 3	at No. 23 Texas	L 86–99	28–3 (15–1)	Frank Erwin Center; Austin, TX
SWC Tournament
Mar 8, 1991*	No. 5	vs. Texas A&M; SWC Tournament Quarterfinal	W 108–61	29–3	Reunion Arena; Dallas, TX
Mar 9, 1991*	No. 5	vs. Rice; SWC Tournament Semifinal	W 109–80	30–3	Reunion Arena; Dallas, TX
Mar 10, 1991*	No. 5	vs. No. 23 Texas; SWC tournament championship	W 120–89	31–3	Reunion Arena; Dallas, TX
NCAA Tournament
Mar 15, 1991*	(1 SE) No. 2	vs. (16 SE) Georgia State; First round	W 117–76	32–3	Omni Coliseum; Atlanta, GA
Mar 17, 1991*	(1 SE) No. 2	vs. (8 SE) Arizona State; Second Round	W 97–90	33–3	Omni Coliseum; Atlanta, GA
Mar 21, 1991*	(1 SE) No. 2	vs. (4 SE) No. 19 Alabama; Regional semifinal	W 93–70	34–3	Charlotte Coliseum; Charlotte, NC
Mar 23, 1991*	(1 SE) No. 2	vs. (3 SE) No. 12 Kansas; Regional Final	L 81–93	34–4	Charlotte Coliseum; Charlotte, NC
*Non-conference game. ^{#}Rankings from AP Poll. (#) Tournament seedings in parentheses. SE=Southeast.

== Rankings ==
Ranking movements Legend: ██ Increase in ranking ██ Decrease in ranking
	Week																
Poll	Pre	1	2	3	4	5	6	7	8	9	10	11	12	13	14	15	Final
AP	2	3	3	2	2	2	2	2	2	2	2	2	3	3	3	5	2
Coaches	3	3	3	2	2	2	2	2	2	2	2	2	3	3	3	6	2

== Awards and honors ==
- Todd Day – Second-Team AP All-American, SWC co-Player of the Year
- Lee Mayberry – Honorable Mention AP All-American
- Oliver Miller – Honorable Mention AP All-American, SWC co-Player of the Year
- Nolan Richardson – SWC Coach of the Year
