= 1979–80 TCU Horned Frogs basketball team =

American college basketball season

1979–80 TCU Horned Frogs men's basketball
- Conference: Southwest Conference
- Record: 7–19 (2–14 SWC)
- Head coach: Jim Killingsworth
- Home arena: Daniel-Meyer Coliseum

1979–80 Southwest Conference men's basketball standings
	Conf.				Overall
Team	W		L	PCT	W		L	PCT
Texas A&M †	14	–	2	.875	26	–	8	.765
Arkansas	13	–	3	.813	21	–	8	.724
Texas	10	–	6	.625	19	–	11	.633
Texas Tech	8	–	8	.500	16	–	13	.552
Houston	8	–	8	.500	14	–	14	.500
SMU	7	–	9	.438	16	–	12	.571
Baylor	6	–	10	.375	11	–	16	.407
Rice	4	–	12	.250	7	–	19	.269
TCU	2	–	14	.125	7	–	19	.269
† 1980 SWC tournament winner Rankings from AP Poll

The 1979–80 TCU Horned Frogs men's basketball team represented Texas Christian University during the 1979–80 men's college basketball season. They finished with a record of 7–19, 2–14 in their conference.

== Roster ==
1979–80 TCU Horned Frogs men's basketball team
Players
Coaches

Pos.	#	Name	Height	Weight	Year	Hometown
	25	Jeff Baker	6 ft 4 in (1.93 m)	170 lb (77 kg)	Fr	Chicago, Illinois
	20	Scott Blackwell	6 ft 1 in (1.85 m)	160 lb (73 kg)	So	Fayetteville, Arkansas
	21	Warren Bridges	6 ft 4 in (1.93 m)	180 lb (82 kg)	Jr	Winter Haven, Florida
	34	Nick Cucinella	6 ft 6 in (1.98 m)	215 lb (98 kg)	Fr	Escondido, CA
	42	Larry Frevert	6 ft 9 in (2.06 m)	230 lb (104 kg)	Jr	Raytown, MO
	30	Kenny Hart	6 ft 4 in (1.93 m)	200 lb (91 kg)	Fr	Hopkinsville, Kentucky
	22	Jim Hund	6 ft 2 in (1.88 m)	180 lb (82 kg)	So	Mascoutah, Illinois
	35	Deckery Johnson	6 ft 5 in (1.96 m)	205 lb (93 kg)	Jr	Nasseu, Bahamas
	31	Darrel Lovett	6 ft 5 in (1.96 m)	195 lb (88 kg)	Jr	LaGrange, GA
	40	Cuney Luke	6 ft 1 in (1.85 m)	170 lb (77 kg)	Jr	El Plaso, Texas
	32	Joe Mansbury	6 ft 6 in (1.98 m)	200 lb (91 kg)	So	Indianapolis, Indiana
	33	Eric Summers	6 ft 5 in (1.96 m)	195 lb (88 kg)	Fr	Greenboro, North Carolina
	41	Ty Thompson	6 ft 9 in (2.06 m)	225 lb (102 kg)	So	Richmond, Indiana
	23	Ed Wineinger	6 ft 3 in (1.91 m)	185 lb (84 kg)	So	Indianapolis, Indiana

Head coach

- Jim Killingsworth

Assistant coach(es)

Legend

- (C) Team captain
- (S) Suspended
- (I) Ineligible
- (W) Walk-on
- Injured
- Current redshirt

== Schedule ==
Date time, TV	Rank^{#}	Opponent^{#}	Result	Record	Site city, state
Regular season
December 1*		Texas-Arlington	W 103–98	1–0	Daniel-Meyer Coliseum; Fort Worth, Texas
December 8*		at North Texas	L 79–84	1–1	Super Pit
December 10*		Illinois	L 64–79	1–2	Daniel-Meyer Coliseum (4,110); Fort Worth, Texas
December 17*		Oregon Tech	W 84–77	2–2	Daniel-Meyer Coliseum; Fort Worth, Texas
December 19*		Georgia State	W 99–82	3–2	Daniel-Meyer Coliseum; Fort Worth, Texas
December 21*		at Fresno State	L 49–83	3–3	Selland Arena; Fresno, California
December 22*		vs. Georgia State	W 119–76	4–3	Selland Arena; Fresno, California
December 29*		NE Missouri State	W 89–71	5–3	Daniel-Meyer Coliseum; Fort Worth, Texas
January 3		Texas A&M	L 63–69	5–4 (0–1)	Daniel-Meyer Coliseum; Fort Worth, Texas
January 5		at Rice	L 47–57	5–5 (0–2)	Rice Gymnasium; Houston, Texas
January 8		Arkansas	L 58–60	5–6 (0–3)	Daniel-Meyer Coliseum; Fort Worth, Texas
January 12		Texas Tech	L 65–84	5–7 (0–4)	Daniel-Meyer Coliseum; Fort Worth, Texas
January 13*		Notre Dame	L 68–85	5–8 (0–4)	Daniel-Meyer Coliseum; Fort Worth, Texas
January 15		at Texas	L 65–95	5–9 (0–5)	Frank Erwin Center; Austin, Texas
January 19		at SMU	W 92–89	6–9 (1–5)	Moody Coliseum; University Park, Texas
January 22		Houston	W 71–69	7–9 (2–5)	Daniel-Meyer Coliseum; Fort Worth, Texas
January 28		at Baylor	L 73–85	7–10 (2–6)	Heart O' Texas Coliseum; Waco, Texas
January 30		Rice	L 59–60	7–11 (2–7)	Daniel-Meyer Coliseum; Fort Worth, Texas
February 2		at Texas Tech	L 42–57	7–12 (2–8)	Lubbock Municipal Coliseum; Lubbock, Texas
February 4		at Arkansas	L 47–74	7–13 (2–9)	Barnhill Arena; Fayetteville, Arkansas
February 6		Texas	L 62–90	7–14 (2–10)	Daniel-Meyer Coliseum; Fort Worth, Texas
February 9		SMU	L 57–76	7–15 (2–11)	Daniel-Meyer Coliseum; Fort Worth, Texas
February 12		at Houston	L 59–87	7–16 (2–12)	Hofheinz Pavilion; Houston, Texas
February 19		at Texas A&M	L 48–57	7–17 (2–13)	G. Rollie White Coliseum; College Station, Texas
February 22		Baylor	L 59–67	7–18 (2–14)	Daniel-Meyer Coliseum; Fort Worth, Texas
Southwest tournament
February 25	(9)	vs. (4) Texas Tech; First Round	L 52–71	7–19 (2–14)	HemisFair Arena; San Antonio, Texas
*Non-conference game. ^{#}Rankings from AP Poll. (#) Tournament seedings in parentheses. All times are in Central Time.
