= 1986–87 Houston Cougars men's basketball team =

American college basketball season

1986–87 Houston Cougars men's basketball
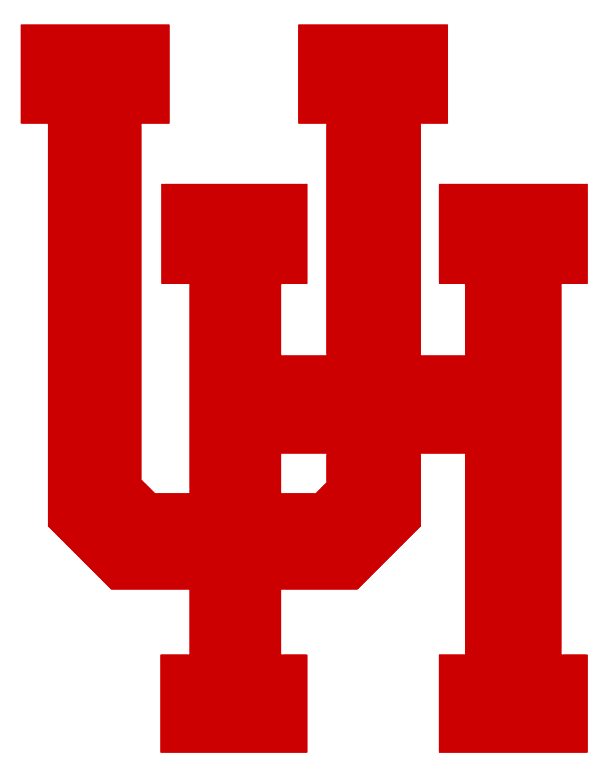

NCAA tournament, First Round
- Conference: Southwest Conference
- Record: 18–12 (9–7 SWC)
- Head coach: Pat Foster (1st season)
- Assistant coaches: Alvin Brooks; Tim Carter
- Home arena: Hofheinz Pavilion

1986–87 Southwest Conference men's basketball standings
	Conf.				Overall
Team	W		L	PCT	W		L	PCT
No. 19 TCU	14	–	2	.875	24	–	7	.774
Baylor	10	–	6	.625	18	–	13	.581
Houston	9	–	7	.563	18	–	12	.600
Texas Tech	9	–	7	.563	15	–	14	.517
Arkansas	8	–	8	.500	19	–	14	.576
SMU	7	–	9	.438	16	–	13	.552
Texas	7	–	9	.438	14	–	17	.452
Texas A&M †	6	–	10	.375	17	–	14	.548
Rice	2	–	14	.125	8	–	19	.296
† 1987 SWC tournament winner Rankings from AP Poll

The 1986–87 Houston Cougars men's basketball team represented the University of Houston as a member of the Southwest Conference during the 1986–87 NCAA men's basketball season. Following the 30-year tenure of legendary coach Guy Lewis, the team was led by first-year head coach Pat Foster. The team played its home games at the Hofheinz Pavilion in Houston, Texas.

The Cougars played in the NCAA tournament for the first time in three seasons, and lost in the opening round to Kansas, 66–55. Houston finished with a record of 18–12 (9–7 SWC).

== Roster ==
1986–87 Houston Cougars men's basketball team
Players
Coaches

Pos.	#	Name	Height	Weight	Year	Previous school	Hometown
F/C	54	Greg Anderson	6 ft 10 in (2.08 m)	220 lb (100 kg)	Sr	Worthing HS	Houston, TX
F	50	Stacey Belcher	6 ft 6 in (1.98 m)	210 lb (95 kg)	Sr	Yates HS	Houston, TX
G	3	Randy Brown	6 ft 2 in (1.88 m)	185 lb (84 kg)	Fr	Collins HS	Chicago, Illinois
C	33	Rolando Ferreira	7 ft 1 in (2.16 m)	235 lb (107 kg)	Jr	Colegro Objectivo	São Paulo, Brazil
F	40	Rickie Winslow	6 ft 8 in (2.03 m)	215 lb (98 kg)	Sr	Yates HS	Houston, TX

Head coach

- Pat Foster

Assistant coach(es)

- Alvin Brooks
- Tim Carter

Legend

- (C) Team captain
- (S) Suspended
- (I) Ineligible
- (W) Walk-on
- Injured
- Current redshirt

== Schedule and results ==
Date time, TV	Rank^{#}	Opponent^{#}	Result	Record	Site (attendance) city, state
Regular season
Nov 28, 1986*		St. Mary's	W 80–68	1–0	Hofheinz Pavilion; Houston, Texas
Dec 1, 1986*		Minnesota	W 86–72	2–0	Hofheinz Pavilion; Houston, Texas
Dec 5, 1986*		vs. Mississippi Valley State; Kactus Classic	W 78–70	3–0	ASU Activity Center; Tempe, Arizona
Dec 6, 1986*		at Arizona State; Kactus Classic	W 83–66	4–0	ASU Activity Center; Tempe, Arizona
Dec 9, 1986*		at Long Beach State	L 65–71	4–1	The Gold Mine; Long Beach, California
Dec 13, 1986*		New Orleans	W 83–75	5–1	Hofheinz Pavilion; Houston, Texas
Dec 20, 1986*		at West Texas State	L 66–68	5–2	WTAMU Fieldhouse; Canyon, Texas
Dec 28, 1986*		vs. Villanova; Sugar Bowl Classic	L 60–63	5–3	Louisiana Superdome; New Orleans, Louisiana
Dec 29, 1986*		vs. Vanderbilt; Sugar Bowl Classic	W 73–72	6–3	Louisiana Superdome; New Orleans, Louisiana
Jan 3, 1987		Texas Tech	W 68–45	7–3 (1–0)	Hofheinz Pavilion; Houston, Texas
Jan 5, 1987*		Pan American	W 87–37	8–3	Hofheinz Pavilion; Houston, Texas
Jan 10, 1987		at Rice	W 71–36	9–3 (2–0)	Rice Gymnasium; Houston, Texas
Jan 17, 1987		Arkansas	W 60–55	10–3 (3–0)	Hofheinz Pavilion; Houston, Texas
Jan 19, 1987		at Texas A&M	L 45–57	10–4 (3–1)	G. Rollie White Coliseum; College Station, Texas
Jan 21, 1987		at SMU	W 75–65	11–4 (4–1)	Moody Coliseum; University Park, Texas
Jan 24, 1987		No. 19 TCU	L 56–62	11–5 (4–2)	Hofheinz Pavilion; Houston, Texas
Jan 26, 1987		Baylor	L 62–67	11–6 (4–3)	Hofheinz Pavilion; Houston, Texas
Jan 28, 1987		Texas	W 65–59	12–6 (5–3)	Hofheinz Pavilion; Houston, Texas
Jan 31, 1987		at Texas Tech	L 55–56 ^{OT}	12–7 (5–4)	Lubbock Municipal Coliseum; Lubbock, Texas
Feb 3, 1987*		Southwestern Louisiana	W 72–51	13–7	Hofheinz Pavilion; Houston, Texas
Feb 7, 1987		Rice	W 75–62	14–7 (6–4)	Hofheinz Pavilion; Houston, Texas
Feb 11, 1987		at Arkansas	W 57–54	15–7 (7–4)	Barnhill Arena; Fayetteville, Arkansas
Feb 14, 1987		at Baylor	L 57–63 ^{OT}	15–8 (7–5)	Heart O' Texas Coliseum; Waco, Texas
Feb 18, 1987		Texas A&M	W 67–46	16–8 (8–5)	Hofheinz Pavilion; Houston, Texas
Feb 22, 1987		SMU	L 73–79	16–9 (8–6)	Hofheinz Pavilion; Houston, Texas
Feb 25, 1987		at No. 15 TCU	W 84–65	17–9 (9–6)	Daniel-Meyer Coliseum; Fort Worth, Texas
Feb 28, 1987		at Texas	L 64–65	17–10 (9–7)	Frank Erwin Center; Austin, Texas
SWC tournament
Mar 5, 1987*	(3)	vs. (6) Texas; Quarterfinals	W 59–49	18–10	Reunion Arena; Dallas, Texas
Mar 6, 1987*	(3)	vs. (2) Baylor; Semifinals	L 52–54	18–11	Reunion Arena; Dallas, Texas
NCAA tournament
Mar 13, 1987*	(12 SE)	vs. (5 SE) No. 20 Kansas; First Round	L 55–66	18–12	Omni Coliseum; Atlanta, Georgia
*Non-conference game. ^{#}Rankings from AP Poll. (#) Tournament seedings in parentheses. SE=Southeast region.

== NBA draft ==
Round	Pick	Player	NBA club
1	23	Greg "Cadillac" Anderson	San Antonio Spurs
2	28	Rickie Winslow	Chicago Bulls
