= 1986–87 TCU Horned Frogs basketball team =

American college basketball season

1986–87 TCU Horned Frogs men's basketball

SWC regular season champions

NCAA tournament, Second Round
- Conference: Southwest Conference

Ranking
- Coaches: No. 16
- AP: No. 19
- Record: 24–7 (14–2 SWC)
- Head coach: Jim Killingsworth (8th season)
- Home arena: Daniel-Meyer Coliseum

1986–87 Southwest Conference men's basketball standings
	Conf.				Overall
Team	W		L	PCT	W		L	PCT
No. 19 TCU	14	–	2	.875	24	–	7	.774
Baylor	10	–	6	.625	18	–	13	.581
Houston	9	–	7	.563	18	–	12	.600
Texas Tech	9	–	7	.563	15	–	14	.517
Arkansas	8	–	8	.500	19	–	14	.576
SMU	7	–	9	.438	16	–	13	.552
Texas	7	–	9	.438	14	–	17	.452
Texas A&M †	6	–	10	.375	17	–	14	.548
Rice	2	–	14	.125	8	–	19	.296
† 1987 SWC tournament winner Rankings from AP Poll

The 1986–87 TCU Horned Frogs men's basketball team represented Texas Christian University as a member of the Southwestern Conference during the 1986–87 men's college basketball season. Led by head coach Jim Killingsworth, TCU won the regular season conference title and received an at-large bid to the NCAA tournament as No. 4 seed in the East region. After an opening round victory over Marshall, the Horned Frogs were beaten by No. 5 seed Notre Dame, 58–57, in the round of 32. The team finished with a record of 24–7 (14–2 SWC).

== Roster ==
1986–87 TCU Horned Frogs men's basketball team
Players
Coaches

Pos.	#	Name	Height	Weight	Year	Hometown
G	23	Jamie Dixon	6 ft 4 in (1.93 m)	—	Sr	Los Angeles, California
G	32	Carven Holcombe	6 ft 5 in (1.96 m)	200 lb (91 kg)	Sr	Houston, Texas

Head coach

- Jim Killingsworth

Assistant coach(es)

Legend

- (C) Team captain
- (S) Suspended
- (I) Ineligible
- (W) Walk-on
- Injured
- Current redshirt

== Schedule ==
Date time, TV	Rank^{#}	Opponent^{#}	Result	Record	Site city, state
Regular season
Nov 21, 1986*		at LSU; Preseason NIT	W 83–74	1–0	LSU Assembly Center; Baton Rouge, Louisiana
Nov 24, 1986*		at Western Kentucky; Preseason NIT	L 90–96	1–1	E.A. Diddle Arena; Bowling Green, Kentucky
Dec 1, 1986*		at Lamar	L 72–83	1–2	Montagne Center; Beaumont, Texas
Dec 3, 1986*		North Texas	W 92–85	2–2	Daniel-Meyer Coliseum; Fort Worth, Texas
Dec 6, 1986*		at Colorado State	W 80–77	3–2	Moby Arena; Fort Collins, Colorado
Dec 8, 1986*		Tulsa	W 71–65	4–2	Daniel-Meyer Coliseum; Fort Worth, Texas
Dec 12, 1986*		at Cal State Fullerton	L 48–56	4–3	Titan Gym; Fullerton, California
Dec 13, 1986*		vs. Arizona State; Cougar Classic	W 96–78	5–3	
Dec 20, 1986*		Michigan State	W 66–48	6–3	Daniel-Meyer Coliseum; Fort Worth, Texas
Dec 23, 1986*		Long Beach State	W 88–72	7–3	Daniel-Meyer Coliseum; Fort Worth, Texas
Dec 26, 1986*		vs. Oklahoma State; All-College Tournament	W 92–61	8–3	Myriad Convention Center; Oklahoma City, Oklahoma
Dec 27, 1986*		vs. No. 6 Oklahoma; All-College Tournament	W 95–82	9–3	Myriad Convention Center; Oklahoma City, Oklahoma
Jan 3, 1987		at Arkansas	W 80–77	10–3 (1–0)	Barnhill Arena; Fayetteville, Arkansas
Jan 7, 1987		Baylor	W 71–56	11–3 (2–0)	Daniel-Meyer Coliseum; Fort Worth, Texas
Jan 10, 1987		Texas A&M	W 55–54	12–3 (3–0)	Daniel-Meyer Coliseum; Fort Worth, Texas
Jan 14, 1987		at SMU	W 57–53	13–3 (4–0)	Moody Coliseum; Dallas, Texas
Jan 19, 1987	No. 19	Texas	W 52–37	14–3 (5–0)	Daniel-Meyer Coliseum; Fort Worth, Texas
Jan 21, 1987	No. 19	at Texas Tech	W 48–43	15–3 (6–0)	Lubbock Municipal Coliseum; Lubbock, Texas
Jan 24, 1987	No. 19	at Houston	W 62–56	16–3 (7–0)	Hofheinz Pavilion; Houston, Texas
Jan 28, 1987	No. 16	Rice	W 64–38	17–3 (8–0)	Daniel-Meyer Coliseum; Fort Worth, Texas
Jan 31, 1987	No. 16	Arkansas	W 73–66	18–3 (9–0)	Daniel-Meyer Coliseum; Fort Worth, Texas
Feb 4, 1987	No. 15	at Baylor	L 63–66	18–4 (9–1)	Heart O' Texas Fair Complex; Waco, Texas
Feb 8, 1987	No. 15	at Texas A&M	W 55–50	19–4 (10–1)	G. Rollie White Coliseum; College Station, Texas
Feb 12, 1987	No. 18	SMU	W 69–50	20–4 (11–1)	Daniel-Meyer Coliseum; Fort Worth, Texas
Feb 18, 1987	No. 16	at Texas	W 70–54	21–4 (12–1)	Frank Erwin Center; Austin, Texas
Feb 21, 1987	No. 16	Texas Tech	W 52–44	22–4 (13–1)	Daniel-Meyer Coliseum; Fort Worth, Texas
Feb 25, 1987	No. 15	Houston	L 65–84	22–5 (13–2)	Daniel-Meyer Coliseum; Fort Worth, Texas
Feb 28, 1987	No. 15	at Rice	W 85–69	23–5 (14–2)	Rice Gymnasium; Houston, Texas
SWC tournament
Mar 6, 1987*	(1) No. 15	vs. (8) Texas A&M; Quarterfinals	L 70–81	23–6	Reunion Arena; Dallas, Texas
NCAA tournament
Mar 12, 1987*	(4 E) No. 19	vs. (13 E) Marshall; First round	W 76–60	24–6	Charlotte Coliseum; Charlotte, North Carolina
Mar 14, 1987*	(4 E) No. 19	vs. (5 E) No. 18 Notre Dame; Second round	L 57–58	24–7	Charlotte Coliseum; Charlotte, North Carolina
*Non-conference game. ^{#}Rankings from AP Poll. (#) Tournament seedings in parentheses. E=East. All times are in Central Time.
