= 1979–80 Arkansas Razorbacks men's basketball team =

American college basketball season

1979–80 Arkansas Razorbacks men's basketball

NCAA tournament, First Round
- Conference: Southwest Conference
- Record: 21–8 (13–3 SWC)
- Head coach: Eddie Sutton (6th season)
- Home arena: Barnhill Arena (Capacity: 9,000)

1979–80 Southwest Conference men's basketball standings
	Conf.				Overall
Team	W		L	PCT	W		L	PCT
Texas A&M †	14	–	2	.875	26	–	8	.765
Arkansas	13	–	3	.813	21	–	8	.724
Texas	10	–	6	.625	19	–	11	.633
Texas Tech	8	–	8	.500	16	–	13	.552
Houston	8	–	8	.500	14	–	14	.500
SMU	7	–	9	.438	16	–	12	.571
Baylor	6	–	10	.375	11	–	16	.407
Rice	4	–	12	.250	7	–	19	.269
TCU	2	–	14	.125	7	–	19	.269
† 1980 SWC tournament winner Rankings from AP Poll

The 1979–80 Arkansas Razorbacks men's basketball team represented the University of Arkansas in the 1979–80 college basketball season. The Razorbacks played their home games in Barnhill Arena in Fayetteville, Arkansas. It was Eddie Sutton's sixth season as head coach of the Hogs. The Razorbacks finished second in the Southwest Conference regular season standings with a conference record of 13–3 and an overall record of 21–8.

The Razorbacks earned an at-large bid to the NCAA tournament, Arkansas's eighth appearance in the tournament overall and fourth consecutive appearance, following appearances in the 1978 Final Four and the 1979 Elite Eight. The Hogs were defeated by Kansas State in the first round of the tournament.

Arkansas entered the AP Poll at #20 on December 10, 1979, rising to #19 on December 26 before consecutive losses knocked the Hogs out of the poll for the rest of the season.

Sophomore center Scott Hastings was named to the All-SWC First Team.

The 1979–80 season is also noteworthy for featuring the longest game in Razorback history, an 84–90 triple-overtime loss at Houston.

== Roster ==
1979–80 Arkansas Razorbacks men's basketball team
Players
Coaches

Pos.	#	Name	Height	Weight	Year	Previous school	Hometown
F	20	Alan Zahn	6 ft 7 in (2.01 m)	200 lb (91 kg)	Sr	Manzano High School	Albuquerque, New Mexico
C	44	Scott Hastings	6 ft 10 in (2.08 m)	235 lb (107 kg)	So	Independence High School	Independence, Kansas
G	24	U.S. Reed	6 ft 2 in (1.88 m)	175 lb (79 kg)	Jr	Pine Bluff High School	Pine Bluff, Arkansas
G	34	Mike Young	6 ft 4 in (1.93 m)	185 lb (84 kg)	Jr	Central Noble High School	Wolf Lake, Indiana
G/F	12	Brad Friess	6 ft 6 in (1.98 m)	200 lb (91 kg)	So	Anderson High School	Austin, Texas
G	21	Keith Hilliard	6 ft 2 in (1.88 m)	188 lb (85 kg)	Jr	Douglass High School; Northeastern Oklahoma A&M	Memphis, Tennessee
F	43	Greg Skulman	6 ft 5 in (1.96 m)	199 lb (90 kg)	So	Ozark High School; Westark Junior College	Ozark, Arkansas
C	45	Carey Kelly	6 ft 7 in (2.01 m)	218 lb (99 kg)	RS Fr	Canton High School; Mississippi State	Canton, Mississippi
G/F	40	Tony Brown	6 ft 6 in (1.98 m)	195 lb (88 kg)	So	Farragut High School	Chicago, Illinois
F	42	Keith Peterson	6 ft 6 in (1.98 m)	217 lb (98 kg)	So	Parkview High School	Little Rock, Arkansas
F	33	Leroy Sutton	6 ft 6 in (1.98 m)	206 lb (93 kg)	Fr	John Adams High School	South Bend, Indiana
C	50	James Crockett	6 ft 9 in (2.06 m)	220 lb (100 kg)	Jr	West Helena High School	West Helena, Arkansas
F	30	Scott Horrell	6 ft 8 in (2.03 m)	215 lb (98 kg)	Fr	Marmaduke High School	Marmaduke, Arkansas
G	10	Eugene Nash (W)	6 ft 0 in (1.83 m)	164 lb (74 kg)	So	Rivercrest High School	Tyronza, Arkansas
G		Russ Pennell	—	—	Fr	Pittsburg High School	Pittsburg, Kansas
F	52	David Richardson	—	—		N/A	N/A

Head coach

Eddie Sutton (Oklahoma State)

Assistant coach(es)

Legend

- (C) Team captain
- (S) Suspended
- (I) Ineligible
- (W) Walk-on
- Injured
- Current redshirt

Roster
Last update: August 17, 2022

== Schedule and results ==
Schedule retrieved from HogStats.com.

Date time, TV	Rank^{#}	Opponent^{#}	Result	Record	Site city, state
Regular season
December 1, 1979*		Loyola Marymount	W 76–66	1–0	Barnhill Arena; Fayetteville, Arkansas
December 3, 1979*		Centenary	W 65–53	2–0	Barnhill Arena; Fayetteville, Arkansas
December 5, 1979*		Missouri–St. Louis	W 79–50	3–0	Barnhill Arena; Fayetteville, Arkansas
December 8, 1979*		at Centenary	W 70–62	4–0	Gold Dome; Shreveport, Louisiana
Exhibition
December 10, 1979*		Athletes in Action	W 68–67 ^{OT}	4–0	Barton Coliseum; Little Rock, Arkansas
Regular season
December 15, 1979*	No. 20	Mississippi	W 67–59	5–0	Barton Coliseum; Little Rock, Arkansas
December 17, 1979*	No. 20	Oklahoma City	W 86–68	6–0	Barnhill Arena; Fayetteville, Arkansas
December 20, 1979*	No. 20	No. 6 LSU	L 55–56	6–1	Barton Coliseum; Little Rock, Arkansas
December 28, 1979*	No. 19	at Memphis State	L 67–74	6–2	Mid-South Coliseum; Memphis, Tennessee
December 30, 1979*		Kansas State	L 57–66	6–3	Pine Bluff Convention Center; Pine Bluff, Arkansas
January 3, 1980		SMU	W 84–69	7–3 (1–0)	Barnhill Arena; Fayetteville, Arkansas
January 5, 1980*		Louisiana–Monroe	W 74–51	8–3 (1–0)	Pine Bluff Convention Center; Pine Bluff, Arkansas
January 8, 1980		at TCU	W 70–58	9–3 (2–0)	Daniel-Meyer Coliseum; Fort Worth, Texas
January 12, 1980; NBC		at Texas	W 55–50	10–3 (3–0)	Frank Erwin Center; Austin, Texas
January 15, 1980		Baylor	W 71–57	11–3 (4–0)	Barnhill Arena; Fayetteville, Arkansas
January 19, 1980		Houston	W 60–57	12–3 (5–0)	Barnhill Arena; Fayetteville, Arkansas
January 22, 1980		at Texas A&M	L 39–45	12–4 (5–1)	G. Rollie White Coliseum; College Station, Texas
January 26, 1980		Rice	W 73–64	13–4 (6–1)	Barnhill Arena; Fayetteville, Arkansas
January 28, 1980		at Texas Tech	W 71–69 ^{OT}	14–4 (7–1)	Lubbock Municipal Coliseum; Lubbock, Texas
February 2, 1980		Texas	W 60–59	15–4 (8–1)	Barnhill Arena; Fayetteville, Arkansas
February 4, 1980		TCU	W 74–47	16–4 (9–1)	Barnhill Arena; Fayetteville, Arkansas
February 7, 1980		at Baylor	W 70–51	17–4 (10–1)	Heart O' Texas Fair Coliseum; Waco, Texas
February 9, 1980		at Houston	L 84–90 ^{3OT}	17–5 (10–2)	Hofheinz Pavilion; Houston, Texas
February 12, 1980		Texas A&M	W 45–44	18–5 (11–2)	Barnhill Arena; Fayetteville, Arkansas
February 16, 1980		at Rice	W 77–73	19–5 (12–2)	Tudor Fieldhouse; Houston, Texas
February 18, 1980		at SMU	L 58–62	19–6 (12–3)	Moody Coliseum; Dallas, Texas
February 23, 1980		Texas Tech	W 84–60	20–6 (13–3)	Barnhill Arena; Fayetteville, Arkansas
SWC tournament
February 29, 1980*	(2)	vs. (3) Texas; Semifinals	W 64–62	21–6 (13–3)	San Antonio Convention Center Arena; San Antonio, Texas
March 1, 1980*	(2)	vs. (1) Texas A&M; Championship	L 50–52	21–7 (13–3)	San Antonio Convention Center Arena; San Antonio, Texas
NCAA tournament
March 6, 1980*	(MW10)	vs. (MW7) Kansas State; First Round	L 53–71	21–8 (13–3)	Bob Devaney Sports Center; Lincoln, Nebraska
*Non-conference game. ^{#}Rankings from AP Poll. (#) Tournament seedings in parentheses. All times are in Central Time.
