= 1980–81 Houston Cougars men's basketball team =

American college basketball season

1980–81 Houston Cougars men's basketball
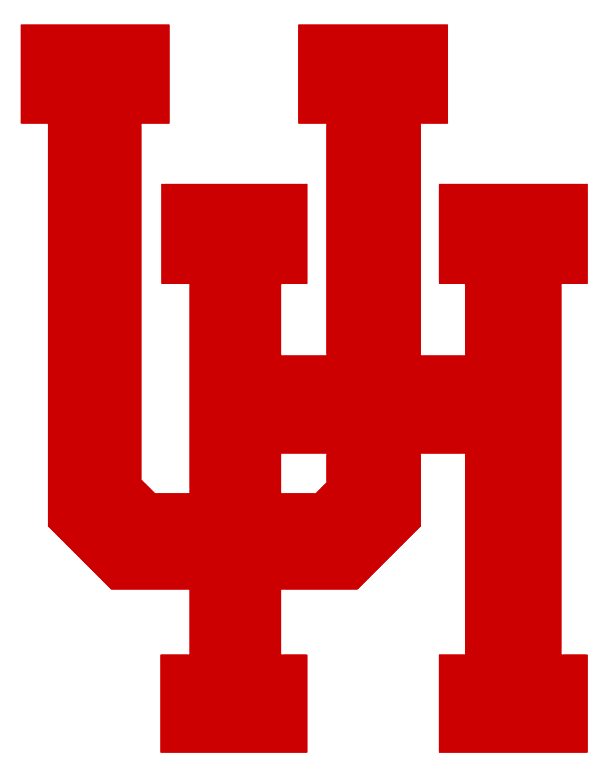

SWC tournament champions

NCAA tournament, First Round
- Conference: Southwest Conference
- Record: 21–9 (10–6 SWC)
- Head coach: Guy Lewis (25th season)
- Assistant coaches: Terry Kirkpatrick; Don Schverak
- Home arena: Hofheinz Pavilion

1980–81 Southwest Conference men's basketball standings
	Conf.				Overall
Team	W		L	PCT	W		L	PCT
No. 20 Arkansas	13	–	3	.813	24	–	8	.750
Houston †	10	–	6	.625	21	–	9	.700
Baylor	10	–	6	.625	15	–	12	.556
Texas Tech	8	–	8	.500	15	–	13	.536
Texas A&M	8	–	8	.500	15	–	12	.556
Texas	7	–	9	.438	15	–	15	.500
Rice	7	–	9	.438	12	–	15	.444
TCU	6	–	10	.375	11	–	18	.379
SMU	3	–	13	.188	7	–	20	.259
† 1981 SWC tournament winner Rankings from AP poll

The 1980–81 Houston Cougars men's basketball team represented the University of Houston in NCAA Division I competition in the 1980–81 season.

Houston, coached by Guy Lewis, played its home games in the Hofheinz Pavilion in Houston, Texas, and was then a member of the Southwest Conference.

== Roster ==
1980–81 Houston Cougars men's basketball team
Players
Coaches

Pos.	#	Name	Height	Weight	Year	Previous school	Hometown
C	50	Dan Bunce	7 ft 0 in (2.13 m)	235 lb (107 kg)	Fr	Conroe HS	Conroe, TX
C	52	David Bunce	6 ft 11 in (2.11 m)	225 lb (102 kg)	So	Conroe HS	Conroe, TX
G	12	Eric Davis	6 ft 2 in (1.88 m)	180 lb (82 kg)	Jr	Senn HS	Chicago, IL
F	22	Clyde Drexler	6 ft 6 in (1.98 m)	205 lb (93 kg)	Fr	Sterling HS	Houston, TX
F/C	40	Larry Micheaux	6 ft 9 in (2.06 m)	220 lb (100 kg)	So	Worthing HS	Houston, TX
G	10	Rodney Parker	6 ft 0 in (1.83 m)	200 lb (91 kg)	Jr	Davis HS	Houston, TX
G	24	Dave Rose	6 ft 3 in (1.91 m)	185 lb (84 kg)	So	Dixie College	Houston, TX
G	00	Lynden Rose	6 ft 3 in (1.91 m)	175 lb (79 kg)	Jr	Springs HS	Nassau, Bahamas
G	20	Rob Williams	6 ft 2 in (1.88 m)	175 lb (79 kg)	So	Milby HS	Houston, TX
F	42	Michael Young	6 ft 6 in (1.98 m)	210 lb (95 kg)	Fr	Yates HS	Houston, TX

Head coach

- Guy Lewis (Houston)

Assistant coach(es)

- Terry Kirkpatrick
- Don Schverak

Legend

- (C) Team captain
- (S) Suspended
- (I) Ineligible
- (W) Walk-on
- Injured
- Current redshirt

Roster

== Schedule and results ==
Date time, TV	Rank^{#}	Opponent^{#}	Result	Record	Site city, state
Regular season
Nov 28, 1980*		Texas A&I	W 112–86	1–0	Hofheinz Pavilion; Houston, Texas
Dec 1, 1980*		USC	W 71–54	2–0	Hofheinz Pavilion; Houston, Texas
Dec 6, 1980*		at Biscayne	L 74–76	2–1	Unknown; Miami Gardens, Florida
Dec 9, 1980*		Texas Wesleyan	W 93–84	3–1	Hofheinz Pavilion; Houston, Texas
Dec 13, 1980*		Pan American	W 84–70	4–1	Hofheinz Pavilion; Houston, Texas
Dec 16, 1980*		Pepperdine	W 94–81	5–1	Hofheinz Pavilion; Houston, Texas
Dec 19, 1980*		Army; Kettle Classic	W 88–58	6–1	Houston Astrodome; Houston, Texas
Dec 20, 1980*		Wyoming; Kettle Classic	W 70–61	7–1	Houston Astrodome; Houston, Texas
Dec 23, 1980*		at Nevada	W 86–71	8–1	Centennial Coliseum; Reno, Nevada
Dec 27, 1980*		at Alaska Anchorage	L 78–79	8–2	Unknown; Anchorage, Alaska
Jan 3, 1981		at Rice	W 62–57	9–2 (1–0)	Rice Gymnasium; Houston, Texas
Jan 6, 1981		Texas Tech	W 73–70	10–2 (2–0)	Hofheinz Pavilion; Houston, Texas
Jan 10, 1981		at Texas	W 91–71	11–2 (3–0)	Frank Erwin Center; Austin, Texas
Jan 13, 1981		at SMU	L 70–72 ^{3OT}	11–3 (3–1)	Moody Coliseum; University Park, Texas
Jan 17, 1981*		Lamar	W 70–64	12–3	Hofheinz Pavilion; Houston, Texas
Jan 19, 1981		Arkansas	W 57–54	13–3 (4–1)	Hofheinz Pavilion; Houston, Texas
Jan 24, 1981		TCU	W 68–59	14–3 (5–1)	Hofheinz Pavilion; Houston, Texas
Jan 26, 1981		at Baylor	W 53–51	15–3 (6–1)	Heart O' Texas Coliseum; Waco, Texas
Jan 28, 1981		Texas A&M	W 76–71	16–3 (7–1)	Hofheinz Pavilion; Houston, Texas
Jan 31, 1981		at Texas Tech	L 70–81	16–4 (7–2)	Lubbock Municipal Coliseum; Lubbock, Texas
Feb 3, 1981		SMU	W 79–64	17–4 (8–2)	Hofheinz Pavilion; Houston, Texas
Feb 7, 1981		Texas	W 75–59	18–4 (9–2)	Hofheinz Pavilion; Houston, Texas
Feb 14, 1981		at Arkansas	L 55–70	18–5 (9–3)	Barnhill Arena; Fayetteville, Arkansas
Feb 17, 1981		at TCU	L 77–78 ^{4OT}	18–6 (9–4)	Daniel-Meyer Coliseum; Fort Worth, Texas
Feb 21, 1981		Baylor	L 68–70	18–7 (9–5)	Hofheinz Pavilion; Houston, Texas
Feb 24, 1981		Rice	W 63–55	19–7 (10–5)	Hofheinz Pavilion; Houston, Texas
Feb 28, 1981		at Texas A&M	L 77–78	19–8 (10–6)	G. Rollie White Coliseum; College Station, Texas
SWC tournament
Mar 6, 1981*	(2)	vs. (8) TCU; Semifinals	W 73–53	20–8	HemisFair Arena; San Antonio, Texas
Mar 7, 1981*	(2)	vs. (6) Texas; Championship	W 84–59	21–8	HemisFair Arena; San Antonio, Texas
NCAA tournament
Mar 13, 1981*	(8 E)	vs. (9 E) Villanova; First round	L 72–90	21–9	Charlotte Coliseum; Charlotte, North Carolina
*Non-conference game. ^{#}Rankings from AP Poll. (#) Tournament seedings in parentheses. E=East. All times are in Central Time.
