= 1990–91 Houston Cougars men's basketball team =

American college basketball season

1990–91 Houston Cougars men's basketball
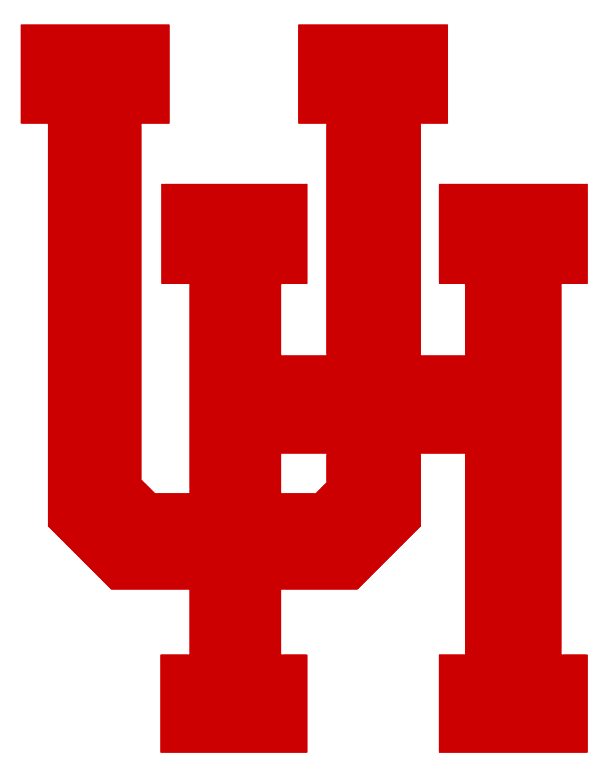

NIT, First Round
- Conference: Southwest Conference
- Record: 18–11 (10–6 SWC)
- Head coach: Pat Foster (5th season)
- Assistant coaches: Alvin Brooks; Tommy Jones
- Home arena: Hofheinz Pavilion

1990–91 Southwest Conference men's basketball standings
	Conf.				Overall
Team	W		L	PCT	W		L	PCT
No. 2 Arkansas †	15	–	1	.938	34	–	4	.895
No. 23 Texas	13	–	3	.813	23	–	9	.719
Houston	10	–	6	.625	18	–	11	.621
TCU	9	–	7	.563	18	–	10	.643
Rice	9	–	7	.563	16	–	14	.533
SMU	6	–	10	.375	12	–	17	.414
Baylor	4	–	12	.250	12	–	15	.444
Texas Tech	4	–	12	.250	8	–	23	.258
Texas A&M	2	–	14	.125	8	–	21	.276
† 1991 SWC tournament winner Rankings from AP Poll

The 1990–91 Houston Cougars men's basketball team represented the University of Houston as a member of the Southwest Conference during the 1990–91 NCAA men's basketball season. The head coach was Pat Foster, and the team played its home games at the Hofheinz Pavilion in Houston, Texas.

== Roster ==
1990–91 Houston Cougars men's basketball team
Players
Coaches

Pos.	#	Name	Height	Weight	Year	Previous school	Hometown
G	24	Byron Smith	6 ft 3 in (1.91 m)	—	Sr	Tyler JC	Bossier City, Louisiana
C	52	Álvaro Teherán	7 ft 1 in (2.16 m)	235 lb (107 kg)	Sr	Houston Baptist	María La Baja, Colombia

Head coach

- Pat Foster

Assistant coach(es)

- Alvin Brooks
- Tommy Jones

Legend

- (C) Team captain
- (S) Suspended
- (I) Ineligible
- (W) Walk-on
- Injured
- Current redshirt

== Schedule and results ==
Date time, TV	Rank^{#}	Opponent^{#}	Result	Record	Site (attendance) city, state
Regular season
Nov 24, 1990*		California	W 98–81	1–0	Hofheinz Pavilion; Houston, Texas
Nov 26, 1990*		at Stephen F. Austin	W 84–50	2–0	William R. Johnson Coliseum; Nacogdoches, Texas
Nov 30, 1990*		vs. Iowa State; Diet Pepsi Tournament of Champions	W 87–72	3–0	Charlotte Coliseum; Charlotte, North Carolina
Dec 1, 1990*		vs. South Carolina; Diet Pepsi Tournament of Champions	L 70–74 ^{OT}	3–1	Charlotte Coliseum; Charlotte, North Carolina
Dec 5, 1990*		at Saint Louis	W 85–84	4–1	Kiel Auditorium; St. Louis, Missouri
Dec 8, 1990*		North Texas	W 110–81	5–1	Hofheinz Pavilion; Houston, Texas
Dec 15, 1990*		Texas Southern	W 90–78	6–1	Hofheinz Pavilion; Houston, Texas
Dec 17, 1990*		Centenary (LA)	W 100–57	7–1	Hofheinz Pavilion; Houston, Texas
Dec 27, 1990*		UIC	W 96–63	8–1	Hofheinz Pavilion; Houston, Texas
Dec 29, 1990*		vs. No. 16 Georgetown	L 51–63	8–2	Florida Suncoast Dome; St. Petersburg, Florida
Jan 2, 1991		at Baylor	W 87–85	9–2 (1–0)	Ferrell Center; Waco, Texas
Jan 6, 1991		at No. 2 Arkansas	L 79–95	9–3 (1–1)	Barnhill Arena; Fayetteville, Arkansas
Jan 9, 1991		Rice	W 80–73	10–3 (2–1)	Hofheinz Pavilion; Houston, Texas
Jan 12, 1991*		at DePaul	L 62–76	10–4	Rosemont Horizon; Chicago, Illinois
Jan 17, 1991		at Texas	L 84–90	10–5 (2–2)	Frank Erwin Center; Austin, Texas
Jan 19, 1991		Texas Tech	W 73–70	11–5 (3–2)	Hofheinz Pavilion; Houston, Texas
Jan 23, 1991		TCU	W 91–88 ^{OT}	12–5 (4–2)	Hofheinz Pavilion; Houston, Texas
Jan 26, 1991		at SMU	L 75–81	12–6 (4–3)	Moody Coliseum; University Park, Texas
Jan 29, 1991		at Texas A&M	W 77–64	13–6 (5–3)	G. Rollie White Coliseum; College Station, Texas
Feb 2, 1991		Baylor	W 86–76	14–6 (6–3)	Hofheinz Pavilion; Houston, Texas
Feb 7, 1991		No. 2 Arkansas	L 74–81	14–7 (6–4)	Hofheinz Pavilion; Houston, Texas
Feb 9, 1991		at Rice	L 69–79	14–8 (6–5)	Rice Gymnasium; Houston, Texas
Feb 17, 1991		No. 24 Texas	W 82–73	15–8 (7–5)	Hofheinz Pavilion; Houston, Texas
Feb 20, 1991		at Texas Tech	W 74–59	16–8 (8–5)	Lubbock Municipal Coliseum; Lubbock, Texas
Feb 23, 1991		at TCU	L 74–75	16–9 (8–6)	Daniel-Meyer Coliseum; Fort Worth, Texas
Feb 27, 1991		SMU	W 85–58	17–9 (9–6)	Hofheinz Pavilion; Houston, Texas
Mar 2, 1991		Texas A&M	W 71–68	18–9 (10–6)	Hofheinz Pavilion; Houston, Texas
SWC tournament
Mar 8, 1991*	(3)	vs. (6) SMU; Quarterfinals	L 62–65	18–10	Reunion Arena; Dallas, Texas
NIT
Mar 13, 1991*		at Stanford; First round	L 86–93	18–11	Maples Pavilion; Stanford, California
*Non-conference game. ^{#}Rankings from AP poll. (#) Tournament seedings in parentheses.

== Rankings ==
Ranking movements Legend: ██ Increase in ranking ██ Decrease in ranking — = Not ranked
	Week																	
Poll	Pre	1	2	3	4	5	6	7	8	9	10	11	12	13	14	15	16	Final
AP	—	—	—	—	—	—	—	—	—	—	—	—	—	—	—	—	—	—
Coaches	—	—	25	—	—	—	—	—	—	—	—	—	—	—	—	—	—	—
