= 1991 Southwest Conference men's basketball tournament =

- Classification: Division I
- Season: 1990–91
- Teams: 9
- Site: Reunion Arena; Dallas, Texas
- Champions: Arkansas (6th title)
- Winning coach: Nolan Richardson (3rd title)
- MVP: Oliver Miller (Arkansas)
- Television: ABC

1990–91 Southwest Conference men's basketball standings
	Conf.				Overall
Team	W		L	PCT	W		L	PCT
No. 2 Arkansas †	15	–	1	.938	34	–	4	.895
No. 23 Texas	13	–	3	.813	23	–	9	.719
Houston	10	–	6	.625	18	–	11	.621
TCU	9	–	7	.563	18	–	10	.643
Rice	9	–	7	.563	16	–	14	.533
SMU	6	–	10	.375	12	–	17	.414
Baylor	4	–	12	.250	12	–	15	.444
Texas Tech	4	–	12	.250	8	–	23	.258
Texas A&M	2	–	14	.125	8	–	21	.276
† 1991 SWC tournament winner Rankings from AP Poll

The 1991 Southwest Conference men's basketball tournament was held March 8–10, 1991, at Reunion Arena in Dallas, Texas.

Number 1 seed Arkansas defeated 2 seed Texas 120–89 to win their 6th championship and receive the conference's automatic bid to the 1991 NCAA tournament.

== Format and seeding ==
The tournament consisted of an 9 team single-elimination tournament with the 8 and 9 seeded teams play in a play-in game to decide the 8th spot.

Place	Seed	Team	Conference			Overall		
Place	Seed	Team	W	L	%	W	L	%
1	1	Arkansas	15	1	.938	34	4	.895
2	2	Texas	13	3	.813	23	9	.719
3	3	Houston	10	6	.625	18	11	.621
4	4	TCU	9	7	.563	18	10	.643
4	5	Rice	9	7	.563	16	14	.533
6	6	SMU	6	10	.375	12	17	.414
7	7	Baylor	4	12	.250	12	15	.444
7	8	Texas Tech	4	12	.250	8	23	.258
9	9	Texas A&M	2	14	.125	8	21	.276

== Tournament ==
First round Thursday, March 7
8	Texas Tech	46
9	Texas A&M	57

Quarterfinals; Friday, March 8
1	#5 Arkansas	108
9	Texas A&M	61
4	TCU	57
5	Rice	76
3	Houston	62
6	SMU	65
2	#23 Texas	88
7	Baylor	78

Semifinals; Saturday, March 9
1	#5 Arkansas	109
5	Rice	80
6	SMU	74
2	#23 Texas	82

Finals; Sunday, March 10
1	#5 Arkansas	120
2	#23 Texas	89
