= 1986–87 Arkansas Razorbacks men's basketball team =

American college basketball season

1986–87 Arkansas Razorbacks men's basketball

NIT, Second Round
- Conference: Southwest Conference
- Record: 19–14 (8–8 SwC)
- Head coach: Nolan Richardson (2nd season)
- Assistant coach: Scott Edgar (2nd season)
- Home arena: Barnhill Arena

1986–87 Southwest Conference men's basketball standings
	Conf.				Overall
Team	W		L	PCT	W		L	PCT
No. 19 TCU	14	–	2	.875	24	–	7	.774
Baylor	10	–	6	.625	18	–	13	.581
Houston	9	–	7	.563	18	–	12	.600
Texas Tech	9	–	7	.563	15	–	14	.517
Arkansas	8	–	8	.500	19	–	14	.576
SMU	7	–	9	.438	16	–	13	.552
Texas	7	–	9	.438	14	–	17	.452
Texas A&M †	6	–	10	.375	17	–	14	.548
Rice	2	–	14	.125	8	–	19	.296
† 1987 SWC tournament winner Rankings from AP Poll

The 1986–87 Arkansas Razorbacks men's basketball team represented the University of Arkansas in the 1986-87 season. Led by head coach Nolan Richardson, the Razorbacks would manage a 19–14 record, and a trip to the second round of the NIT. This season, although not the NCAA Tournament, was Arkansas' first postseason tournament under Richardson. The first of many, including a national championship in 1994. The Razorbacks competed in and placed 5th in the Southwest conference.

== Roster ==
1987–88 Arkansas Razorbacks men's basketball team
Players
Coaches

Pos.	#	Name	Height	Weight	Year	Hometown
G	12	Keith Wilson	6 ft 3 in (1.91 m)	170 lb (77 kg)	So	Fort Smith, Arkansas
G	22	Cannon Whitby	6 ft 0 in (1.83 m)	165 lb (75 kg)	Fr	Troy, Tennessee
C	55	Mario Credit	6 ft 9 in (2.06 m)	240 lb (109 kg)	Fr	Kansas City, Kansas

Head coach

- Nolan Richardson (UTEP)

Assistant coach(es)

Legend

- (C) Team captain
- (S) Suspended
- (I) Ineligible
- (W) Walk-on
- Injured
- Current redshirt

== Schedule and results ==
Date time, TV	Rank^{#}	Opponent^{#}	Result	Record	Site city, state
Exhibition Season
Nov 12, 1986*		Poland National Team	W 85–71		Barnhill Arena; Fayetteville, Arkansas
Non-conference regular season
SWC tournament
Mar 6, 1987*	(5)	vs. (4) Texas Tech; Quarterfinal	L 59–73	18–13	Reunion Arena; Dallas, TX
NIT
Mar 13, 1987*		Arkansas State; First Round	W 67–64 ^{OT}	19–13	Barnhill Arena; Fayetteville, Arkansas
Mar 17, 1987*		at Nebraska; Second Round	L 71–78	19–14	Bob Devaney Sports Center; Lincoln, Nebraska
*Non-conference game. ^{#}Rankings from AP Poll. (#) Tournament seedings in parentheses.
