= 1980 Southwest Conference men's basketball tournament =

- Classification: Division I
- Season: 1979–80
- Teams: 9
- Site: HemisFair Arena; San Antonio, Texas
- Champions: Texas A&M (1st title)
- Winning coach: Shelby Metcalf (1st title)
- MVP: David Britton (Texas A&M)

1979–80 Southwest Conference men's basketball standings
	Conf.				Overall
Team	W		L	PCT	W		L	PCT
Texas A&M †	14	–	2	.875	26	–	8	.765
Arkansas	13	–	3	.813	21	–	8	.724
Texas	10	–	6	.625	19	–	11	.633
Texas Tech	8	–	8	.500	16	–	13	.552
Houston	8	–	8	.500	14	–	14	.500
SMU	7	–	9	.438	16	–	12	.571
Baylor	6	–	10	.375	11	–	16	.407
Rice	4	–	12	.250	7	–	19	.269
TCU	2	–	14	.125	7	–	19	.269
† 1980 SWC tournament winner Rankings from AP Poll

The 1980 Southwest Conference men's basketball tournament was held February 28 – March 1, 1980 at HemisFair Arena in San Antonio, Texas. The first round took place February 25 at the higher seeded campus sites.

Number 1 seed Texas A&M defeated 2 seed Arkansas 52-50 to win their 1st championship and receive the conference's automatic bid to the 1980 NCAA tournament.

== Format and seeding ==
The tournament consisted of 9 teams in a single-elimination tournament. The 3 seed received a bye to the Quarterfinals and the 1 and 2 seed received a bye to the Semifinals.

Place	Seed	Team	Conference			Overall		
Place	Seed	Team	W	L	%	W	L	%
1	1	Texas A&M	14	2	.875	26	8	.765
2	2	Arkansas	13	3	.813	21	8	.724
3	3	Texas	10	6	.625	19	11	.633
4	4	Texas Tech	8	8	.500	16	13	.552
4	5	Houston	8	8	.500	14	14	.500
6	6	SMU	7	9	.438	16	12	.571
7	7	Baylor	6	10	.375	11	16	.407
8	8	Rice	4	12	.250	7	19	.269
9	9	TCU	2	14	.125	7	19	.269

== Tournament ==
Date	Winner	Score	Loser	Notes
First Round
Feb 25	6 SMU	86-83	7 Baylor	at SMU
Feb 25	4 Texas Tech	71-52	9 TCU	at Texas Tech
Feb 25	5 Houston	92-80	8 Rice	at Houston
Quarterfinals
Feb 28	4 Texas Tech	73-65	6 SMU	
Feb 28	3 Texas	67-47	5 Houston	
Semifinals
Feb 29	1 Texas A&M	61-51	4 Texas Tech	
Feb 29	2 Arkansas	64-62	3 Texas	
Finals
Mar 1	1 Texas A&M	52-50	2 Arkansas	
