= 1981 Southwest Conference men's basketball tournament =

Competition in San Antonio, Texas

- Classification: Division I
- Season: 1980–81
- Teams: 9
- Site: HemisFair Arena; San Antonio, Texas
- Champions: Houston (2nd title)
- Winning coach: Guy Lewis (2nd title)
- MVP: Rob Williams (Houston)

1980–81 Southwest Conference men's basketball standings
	Conf.				Overall
Team	W		L	PCT	W		L	PCT
No. 20 Arkansas	13	–	3	.813	24	–	8	.750
Houston †	10	–	6	.625	21	–	9	.700
Baylor	10	–	6	.625	15	–	12	.556
Texas Tech	8	–	8	.500	15	–	13	.536
Texas A&M	8	–	8	.500	15	–	12	.556
Texas	7	–	9	.438	15	–	15	.500
Rice	7	–	9	.438	12	–	15	.444
TCU	6	–	10	.375	11	–	18	.379
SMU	3	–	13	.188	7	–	20	.259
† 1981 SWC tournament winner Rankings from AP poll

The 1981 Southwest Conference men's basketball tournament was held March 5–7 at HemisFair Arena in San Antonio, Texas. The first round took place March 2 at the higher seeded campus sites.

Number 2 seed Houston defeated 6 seed Texas 84-59 to win their 2nd championship and receive the conference's automatic bid to the 1981 NCAA tournament.

== Format and seeding ==
The tournament consisted of 9 teams in a single-elimination tournament. The 3 seed received a bye to the Quarterfinals and the 1 and 2 seed received a bye to the Semifinals.

Place	Seed	Team	Conference			Overall		
Place	Seed	Team	W	L	%	W	L	%
1	1	Arkansas	13	3	.813	24	8	.750
2	2	Houston	10	6	.625	21	9	.700
2	3	Baylor	10	6	.625	15	12	.556
4	4	Texas Tech	8	8	.500	15	13	.536
4	5	Texas A&M	8	8	.500	15	12	.556
6	6	Texas	7	9	.438	15	15	.500
6	7	Rice	7	9	.438	12	15	.444
8	8	TCU	6	10	.375	11	18	.379
9	9	SMU	3	13	.188	7	20	.259

== Tournament ==
Date	Winner	Score	Loser	Notes
First Round
Mar 2	6 Texas	58-44	7 Rice	at Texas
Mar 2	4 Texas Tech	80-58	9 SMU	at Texas Tech
Mar 2	8 TCU	62-60	5 Texas A&M	at Texas A&M
Quarterfinals
Mar 5	6 Texas	66-58	4 Texas Tech	
Mar 5	8 TCU	56-47	3 Baylor	
Semifinals
Mar 6	6 Texas	76-73	1 Arkansas	
Mar 6	2 Houston	73-53	8 TCU	
Finals
Mar 7	2 Houston	84-59	6 Texas	
