= 1987 Southwest Conference men's basketball tournament =

- Classification: Division I
- Season: 1986–87
- Teams: 8
- Site: Reunion Arena; Dallas, Texas
- Champions: Texas A&M (2nd title)
- Winning coach: Shelby Metcalf (2nd title)
- MVP: Winston Crite (Texas A&M)
- Television: Raycom Sports

1986–87 Southwest Conference men's basketball standings
	Conf.				Overall
Team	W		L	PCT	W		L	PCT
No. 19 TCU	14	–	2	.875	24	–	7	.774
Baylor	10	–	6	.625	18	–	13	.581
Houston	9	–	7	.563	18	–	12	.600
Texas Tech	9	–	7	.563	15	–	14	.517
Arkansas	8	–	8	.500	19	–	14	.576
SMU	7	–	9	.438	16	–	13	.552
Texas	7	–	9	.438	14	–	17	.452
Texas A&M †	6	–	10	.375	17	–	14	.548
Rice	2	–	14	.125	8	–	19	.296
† 1987 SWC tournament winner Rankings from AP Poll

The 1987 Southwest Conference men's basketball tournament was held March 7–10, 1987, at Reunion Arena in Dallas, Texas.

Number 8 seed Texas A&M defeated 2 seed Baylor 71-46 to win their 2nd championship and receive the conference's automatic bid to the 1987 NCAA tournament.

== Format and seeding ==
The tournament consisted of the top eight teams playing in a single-elimination tournament.

Place	Seed	Team	Conference			Overall		
Place	Seed	Team	W	L	%	W	L	%
1	1	TCU	14	2	.875	24	7	.774
2	2	Baylor	10	6	.625	18	13	.581
3	3	Houston	9	7	.563	18	12	.600
3	4	Texas Tech	9	7	.563	15	14	.517
5	5	Arkansas	8	8	.500	19	14	.576
6	6	Texas	7	9	.438	14	17	.452
6	7	SMU	7	9	.438	16	13	.552
8	8	Texas A&M	6	10	.375	17	14	.548
9	-	Rice	2	14	.125	8	19	.296

== Bracket ==
Quarterfinals; Friday, March 6
1	#15 TCU	70
8	Texas A&M	81
4	Texas Tech	73
5	Arkansas	59
3	Houston	59
6	Texas	49
2	Baylor	83
7	SMU	69

Semifinals; Saturday, March 7
8	Texas A&M	68
4	Texas Tech	60
3	Houston	52
2	Baylor	54

Final; Sunday, March 8
8	Texas A&M	71
2	Baylor	46
