= 1980–81 Arkansas Razorbacks men's basketball team =

American college basketball season

1980–81 Arkansas Razorbacks men's basketball

SWC regular season champions

NCAA Tournament, Sweet Sixteen
- Conference: Southwest Conference

Ranking
- AP: No. 20
- Record: 24–8 (13–3 SWC)
- Head coach: Eddie Sutton (7th season)
- Assistant coach: Bill Brown (1st season)
- Home arena: Barnhill Arena

1980–81 Southwest Conference men's basketball standings
	Conf.				Overall
Team	W		L	PCT	W		L	PCT
No. 20 Arkansas	13	–	3	.813	24	–	8	.750
Houston †	10	–	6	.625	21	–	9	.700
Baylor	10	–	6	.625	15	–	12	.556
Texas Tech	8	–	8	.500	15	–	13	.536
Texas A&M	8	–	8	.500	15	–	12	.556
Texas	7	–	9	.438	15	–	15	.500
Rice	7	–	9	.438	12	–	15	.444
TCU	6	–	10	.375	11	–	18	.379
SMU	3	–	13	.188	7	–	20	.259
† 1981 SWC tournament winner Rankings from AP poll

The 1980–81 Arkansas Razorbacks men's basketball team represented the University of Arkansas during the 1980–81 NCAA Division I men's basketball season. Senior guard US Reed made a half-court shot at the buzzer to beat defending national champion Louisville 74-73 in the second round of the NCAA Tournament, sending Arkansas to the Sweet 16.

== Roster ==
- Craig Olson
- U.S. Reed
- Scott Hastings
- Darrell Walker
- Keith Peterson
- Tony Brown
- Mike Young

== Schedule and results ==
Date time, TV	Rank^{#}	Opponent^{#}	Result	Record	High points	High rebounds	High assists	Site (attendance) city, state
March 12, 1981*	(MW5) No. 20	vs. (MW12) Mercer; NCAA Tournament • First round	W 73–67		–	–	–	Frank Erwin Center; Austin, Texas
March 14, 1981*	(MW5) No. 20	vs. (MW4) No. 12 Louisville; NCAA Tournament • Second Round	W 74–73		–	–	–	Frank Erwin Center; Austin, Texas
March 20, 1981*	(MW5) No. 20	vs. (MW1) No. 4 LSU; NCAA Tournament • Regional semifinal	L 56–72		–	–	–	Louisiana Superdome; New Orleans, Louisiana
*Non-conference game. ^{#}Rankings from AP Poll. (#) Tournament seedings in parentheses. MW=Midwest.
