= 1986–87 Texas A&M Aggies men's basketball team =

American college basketball season

1986–87 Texas A&M Aggies men's basketball

SWC tournament champion

NCAA tournament
- Conference: Southwest Conference
- Record: 17–14 (6–10 SWC)
- Head coach: Shelby Metcalf (24th season)
- Home arena: G. Rollie White Coliseum

1986–87 Southwest Conference men's basketball standings
	Conf.				Overall
Team	W		L	PCT	W		L	PCT
No. 19 TCU	14	–	2	.875	24	–	7	.774
Baylor	10	–	6	.625	18	–	13	.581
Houston	9	–	7	.563	18	–	12	.600
Texas Tech	9	–	7	.563	15	–	14	.517
Arkansas	8	–	8	.500	19	–	14	.576
SMU	7	–	9	.438	16	–	13	.552
Texas	7	–	9	.438	14	–	17	.452
Texas A&M †	6	–	10	.375	17	–	14	.548
Rice	2	–	14	.125	8	–	19	.296
† 1987 SWC tournament winner Rankings from AP Poll

The 1986–87 Texas A&M Aggies men's basketball team represented Texas A&M University as a member of the Southwest Conference during the 1986–87 college basketball season. The team was led by head coach Shelby Metcalf and played their home games at G. Rollie White Coliseum in College Station, Texas. After finishing 8th in the conference regular season standings, the Aggies went on a surprise run and won the SWC tournament to receive the conference's automatic bid to the NCAA tournament. As No. 12 seed in the Midwest region, Texas A&M was beaten by Duke in the opening round. The Aggies finished with a record of 17–14 (6–10 SWC).

== Roster ==
1986–87 Texas A&M Aggies men's basketball team
Players	Coaches
Pos. / # / Name / Height / Weight / Year / Hometown; F / 21 / Winston Crite / 6 ft 7 in (2.01 m) / 225 lb (102 kg) / Sr	Head coach: Shelby Metcalf; Assistant coach(es) Legend: (C) Team captain; (S) Suspended; (I) Ineligible; (W) Walk-on; Injured; Current redshirt

== Schedule and results ==
Date time, TV	Rank^{#}	Opponent^{#}	Result	Record	Site (attendance) city, state
Regular season
Dec 2, 1986*		at No. 11 Oklahoma	L 79–93	0–1	Lloyd Noble Center; Norman, Oklahoma
Dec 4, 1986*		Texas State	W 86–76	1–1	G. Rollie White Coliseum; College Station, Texas
Dec 8, 1986*		Oral Roberts	W 63–56	2–1	G. Rollie White Coliseum; College Station, Texas
Dec 10, 1986*		Texas Southern	W 75–60	3–1	G. Rollie White Coliseum; College Station, Texas
Dec 14, 1986*		Nebraska	W 66–64	4–1	G. Rollie White Coliseum; College Station, Texas
Dec 19, 1986*		vs. Boston University; Kentucky Invitational	L 63–65	4–2	Rupp Arena; Lexington, Kentucky
Dec 20, 1986*		vs. Iona; Kentucky Invitational	W 67–60	5–2	Rupp Arena; Lexington, Kentucky
Dec 29, 1986*		vs. Lehigh; Connecticut Mutual Classic	W 80–60	6–2	Hartford, Connecticut
Dec 30, 1986*		vs. Hartford; Connecticut Mutual Classic	W 79–66	7–2	Hartford, Connecticut
Jan 2, 1987*		vs. Southeastern Louisiana; Drake Heritage Classic	W 93–76	8–2	Veterans Memorial Auditorium; Des Moines, Iowa
Jan 3, 1987*		at Drake; Drake Heritage Classic	L 58–66	8–3	Veterans Memorial Auditorium; Des Moines, Iowa
Jan 7, 1987		SMU	W 61–59	9–3 (1–0)	G. Rollie White Coliseum; College Station, Texas
Jan 10, 1987		at TCU	L 54–55	9–4 (1–1)	Daniel-Meyer Coliseum; Fort Worth, Texas
Jan 14, 1987		Texas	W 68–52	10–4 (2–1)	G. Rollie White Coliseum; College Station, Texas
Jan 17, 1987		Texas Tech	W 62–60	11–4 (3–1)	G. Rollie White Coliseum; College Station, Texas
Jan 19, 1987		Houston	W 57–45	12–4 (4–1)	G. Rollie White Coliseum; College Station, Texas
Jan 21, 1987		at Rice	L 67–69	12–5 (4–2)	Tudor Fieldhouse; Houston, Texas
Jan 25, 1987		at Arkansas	L 69–87	12–6 (4–3)	Barnhill Arena; Fayetteville, Arkansas
Jan 28, 1987		Baylor	L 70–71	12–7 (4–4)	G. Rollie White Coliseum; College Station, Texas
SWC Tournament
Mar 5, 1987*		vs. No. 15 TCU	W 81–70	15–13	Reunion Arena; Dallas, Texas
Mar 6, 1987*		vs. Texas Tech	W 68–60	16–13	Reunion Arena; Dallas, Texas
Mar 7, 1987*		vs. Baylor	W 71–46	17–13	Reunion Arena; Dallas, Texas
NCAA Tournament
Mar 12, 1987*	(12 MW)	vs. (5 MW) No. 17 Duke; First Round	L 51–58	17–14	RCA Dome; Indianapolis, Indiana
*Non-conference game. ^{#}Rankings from AP Poll. (#) Tournament seedings in parentheses. MW=Midwest. All times are in Central Time.
