= 1990–91 Texas Longhorns men's basketball team =

American college basketball season

1990–91 Texas Longhorns men's basketball

NCAA tournament, second round
- Conference: Southwest Conference

Ranking
- Coaches: No. 25
- AP: No. 23
- Record: 23–9 (13–3 SWC)
- Head coach: Tom Penders (3rd season)
- Home arena: Frank Erwin Center

1990–91 Southwest Conference men's basketball standings
	Conf.				Overall
Team	W		L	PCT	W		L	PCT
No. 2 Arkansas †	15	–	1	.938	34	–	4	.895
No. 23 Texas	13	–	3	.813	23	–	9	.719
Houston	10	–	6	.625	18	–	11	.621
TCU	9	–	7	.563	18	–	10	.643
Rice	9	–	7	.563	16	–	14	.533
SMU	6	–	10	.375	12	–	17	.414
Baylor	4	–	12	.250	12	–	15	.444
Texas Tech	4	–	12	.250	8	–	23	.258
Texas A&M	2	–	14	.125	8	–	21	.276
† 1991 SWC tournament winner Rankings from AP Poll

The 1990–91 Texas Longhorns men's basketball team represented The University of Texas at Austin in intercollegiate basketball competition during the 1990–91 season. The Longhorns were led by third-year head coach Tom Penders. The team finished the season with a 23–9 overall record and finished second in Southwest Conference play with a 13–3 conference record. Texas advanced to the NCAA tournament, recording an opening round win over Saint Peter's before falling to St. John's in the second round.

== Roster ==
1990–91 Texas Longhorns men's basketball team
Players
Coaches

Pos.	#	Name	Height	Weight	Year	Hometown
G	3	Benford Williams	6 ft 5 in (1.96 m)	215 lb (98 kg)	Jr
G	10	B. J. Tyler	6 ft 1 in (1.85 m)	180 lb (82 kg)	Fr	Port Arthur, Texas

Head coach

- Tom Penders (Connecticut)

Assistant coach(es)

Legend

- (C) Team captain
- (S) Suspended
- (I) Ineligible
- (W) Walk-on
- Injured
- Current redshirt

== Schedule and results ==
Date time, TV	Rank^{#}	Opponent^{#}	Result	Record	Site (attendance) city, state
Regular season
Nov 27, 1990*	No. 22	at Florida	W 76–74	1–0	Stephen C. O'Connell Center; Gainesville, Florida
Nov 30, 1990*	No. 22	at No. 20 LSU	L 87–101	1–1	Maravich Assembly Center; Baton Rouge, Louisiana
Dec 4, 1990*	No. 23	No. 16 Oklahoma	L 88–96	1–2	Frank Erwin Center; Austin, Texas
Dec 7, 1990*	No. 23	Loyola (MD)	W 112–68	2–2	Frank Erwin Center; Austin, Texas
Dec 8, 1990*	No. 23	Texas-Rio Grande Valley	W 116–70	3–2	Frank Erwin Center; Austin, Texas
Dec 18, 1990*	No. 23	at UC Santa Barbara	W 87–84	4–2	The Thunderdome; Santa Barbara, California
Dec 22, 1990*	No. 23	vs. No. 17 Georgia; Kuppenheimer Classic	L 71–79	4–3	Atlanta, Georgia
Dec 28, 1990*		vs. Michigan	W 76–74	5–3	ASU Activities Center; Tempe, Arizona
Dec 29, 1990*		at Arizona State	L 82–89	5–4	ASU Activities Center; Tempe, Arizona
Mar 3, 1991		No. 3 Arkansas	W 99–86	20–7 (13–3)	Frank Erwin Center; Austin, Texas
Southwest Conference tournament
Mar 8, 1991*	No. 23	vs. Baylor; Quarterfinal	W 88–78	21–7	Reunion Arena; Dallas, Texas
Mar 9, 1991*	No. 23	vs. Southern Methodist; Semifinal	W 82–74	22–7	Reunion Arena; Dallas, Texas
Mar 10, 1991*	No. 23	vs. No. 5 Arkansas; Championship Game	L 89–120	22–8	Reunion Arena; Dallas, Texas
1991 NCAA Tournament – Midwest No. 5 seed
Mar 15, 1991*	(5 MW) No. 23	vs. (12 MW) Saint Peter's; Second Round	W 73–65	23–8	UD Arena; Dayton, Ohio
Mar 17, 1991*	(5 MW) No. 23	vs. (4 MW) No. 20 St. John's; Second Round	L 76–84	23–9	UD Arena; Dayton, Ohio
*Non-conference game. ^{#}Rankings from AP poll. (#) Tournament seedings in parentheses. All times are in Central Standard Time.
