= Texas Tech Red Raiders basketball under Gerald Myers =

College head coaching tenure

Gerald Myers coached the Texas Tech Red Raiders basketball teams from 1971 to 1991, before stepping down to become the athletic director for the Texas Tech Red Raiders. In Myers' twenty seasons at Texas Tech, he compiled a 326–261 record. Under Myers, the Red Raiders won two conference championships and earned four trips to the NCAA tournament and one to the NIT tournament.

== 1970–71 ==
1970–71 Texas Tech Red Raiders basketball
- Conference: Southwest Conference
- Record: 11–13 (6–8 SWC)
- Head coach: Bob Bass; Gerald Myers (interim)
- Assistant coach: Gerald Myers (2nd season)
- Home arena: Lubbock Municipal Coliseum

== 1971–72 ==
1971–72 Texas Tech Red Raiders basketball
- Conference: Southwest Conference
- Record: 14–12 (8–6 SWC)
- Head coach: Gerald Myers (2nd season)
- Home arena: Lubbock Municipal Coliseum

== 1973–74 ==
1973–74 Texas Tech Red Raiders basketball
- Conference: Southwest Conference
- Record: 17–9 (10–4 SWC)
- Head coach: Gerald Myers (4th season)
- Home arena: Lubbock Municipal Coliseum

== 1974–75 ==
1974–75 Texas Tech Red Raiders basketball
- Conference: Southwest Conference
- Record: 18–8 (11–3 SWC)
- Head coach: Gerald Myers (5th season)
- Home arena: Lubbock Municipal Coliseum

== 1976–77 ==
1976–77 Texas Tech Red Raiders basketball
- Conference: Southwest Conference
- Record: 20–9 (12–4 SWC)
- Head coach: Gerald Myers (7th season)
- Home arena: Lubbock Municipal Coliseum

1976–77 Southwest Conference men's basketball standings
	Conf.				Overall
Team	W		L	PCT	W		L	PCT
No. 18 Arkansas†	16	–	0	1.000	26	–	2	.929
Houston	13	–	3	.813	29	–	8	.784
Texas Tech	12	–	4	.750	20	–	9	.690
Texas	8	–	8	.500	13	–	13	.500
Texas A&M	8	–	8	.500	14	–	14	.500
SMU	7	–	9	.438	8	–	19	.296
Baylor	5	–	11	.313	11	–	17	.393
Rice	3	–	13	.188	9	–	18	.333
TCU	0	–	16	.000	3	–	23	.115
† 1977 SWC tournament winner Rankings from AP Poll

== 1977–78 ==
1977–78 Texas Tech Red Raiders basketball
- Conference: Southwest Conference
- Record: 19–10 (10–6 SWC)
- Head coach: Gerald Myers (8th season)
- Home arena: Lubbock Municipal Coliseum

1977–78 Southwest Conference men's basketball standings
	Conf.				Overall
Team	W		L	PCT	W		L	PCT
No. 5 Arkansas	14	–	2	.875	32	–	4	.889
No. 17 Texas	14	–	2	.875	26	–	5	.839
Houston †	11	–	5	.688	25	–	8	.758
Texas Tech	10	–	6	.625	19	–	10	.655
Baylor	8	–	8	.500	14	–	13	.519
SMU	6	–	10	.375	10	–	18	.357
Texas A&M	5	–	11	.313	12	–	15	.444
Rice	2	–	14	.125	4	–	22	.154
TCU	2	–	14	.125	4	–	22	.154
† 1978 SWC tournament winner Rankings from AP Poll

== 1979–80 ==
1979–80 Texas Tech Red Raiders basketball
- Conference: Southwest Conference
- Record: 16–13 (8–8 SWC)
- Head coach: Gerald Myers (10th season)
- Home arena: Lubbock Municipal Coliseum

1979–80 Southwest Conference men's basketball standings
	Conf.				Overall
Team	W		L	PCT	W		L	PCT
Texas A&M †	14	–	2	.875	26	–	8	.765
Arkansas	13	–	3	.813	21	–	8	.724
Texas	10	–	6	.625	19	–	11	.633
Texas Tech	8	–	8	.500	16	–	13	.552
Houston	8	–	8	.500	14	–	14	.500
SMU	7	–	9	.438	16	–	12	.571
Baylor	6	–	10	.375	11	–	16	.407
Rice	4	–	12	.250	7	–	19	.269
TCU	2	–	14	.125	7	–	19	.269
† 1980 SWC tournament winner Rankings from AP Poll

== 1980–81 ==
1980–81 Texas Tech Red Raiders basketball
- Conference: Southwest Conference
- Record: 15–13 (8–8 SWC)
- Head coach: Gerald Myers (11th season)
- Home arena: Lubbock Municipal Coliseum

1980–81 Southwest Conference men's basketball standings
	Conf.				Overall
Team	W		L	PCT	W		L	PCT
No. 20 Arkansas	13	–	3	.813	24	–	8	.750
Houston †	10	–	6	.625	21	–	9	.700
Baylor	10	–	6	.625	15	–	12	.556
Texas Tech	8	–	8	.500	15	–	13	.536
Texas A&M	8	–	8	.500	15	–	12	.556
Texas	7	–	9	.438	15	–	15	.500
Rice	7	–	9	.438	12	–	15	.444
TCU	6	–	10	.375	11	–	18	.379
SMU	3	–	13	.188	7	–	20	.259
† 1981 SWC tournament winner Rankings from AP poll

== 1981–82 ==
1981–82 Texas Tech Red Raiders basketball
- Conference: Southwest Conference
- Record: 17–11 (8–8 SWC)
- Head coach: Gerald Myers (12th season)
- Home arena: Lubbock Municipal Coliseum

1981–82 Southwest Conference men's basketball standings
	Conf.				Overall
Team	W		L	PCT	W		L	PCT
No. 12 Arkansas †	12	–	4	.750	23	–	6	.793
Houston	11	–	5	.688	25	–	8	.758
Texas A&M	10	–	6	.625	20	–	11	.645
Baylor	9	–	7	.563	17	–	11	.607
TCU	9	–	7	.563	16	–	13	.552
Texas Tech	8	–	8	.500	17	–	11	.607
Texas	6	–	10	.375	16	–	10	.615
Rice	6	–	10	.375	15	–	15	.500
SMU	1	–	15	.063	6	–	21	.222
† 1982 SWC tournament winner Rankings from AP poll

== 1982–83 ==
1982–83 Texas Tech Red Raiders basketball
- Conference: Southwest Conference
- Record: 12–19 (7–9 SWC)
- Head coach: Gerald Myers (13th season)
- Home arena: Lubbock Municipal Coliseum

1982–83 Southwest Conference men's basketball standings
	Conf.				Overall
Team	W		L	PCT	W		L	PCT
No. 1 Houston †	16	–	0	1.000	31	–	3	.912
No. 9 Arkansas	14	–	2	.875	26	–	4	.867
Texas A&M	10	–	6	.625	17	–	14	.548
TCU	9	–	7	.563	23	–	11	.676
SMU	9	–	7	.563	19	–	11	.633
Texas Tech	7	–	9	.438	11	–	20	.355
Baylor	4	–	12	.250	12	–	16	.429
Rice	2	–	14	.125	8	–	20	.286
Texas	1	–	15	.063	6	–	22	.214
† 1983 SWC tournament winner Rankings from AP poll

== 1983–84 ==
1983–84 Texas Tech Red Raiders basketball
- Conference: Southwest Conference
- Record: 17–12 (10–6 SWC)
- Head coach: Gerald Myers (14th season)
- Home arena: Lubbock Municipal Coliseum

1983–84 Southwest Conference men's basketball standings
	Conf.				Overall
Team	W		L	PCT	W		L	PCT
No. 5 Houston †	15	–	1	.938	32	–	5	.865
No. 8 Arkansas	14	–	2	.875	25	–	7	.781
SMU	12	–	4	.750	25	–	8	.758
Texas Tech	10	–	6	.625	17	–	12	.586
Texas A&M	7	–	9	.438	16	–	14	.533
Rice	6	–	10	.375	13	–	17	.433
TCU	4	–	12	.250	11	–	17	.393
Texas	3	–	13	.188	7	–	21	.250
Baylor	1	–	15	.063	5	–	23	.179
† 1984 SWC tournament winner Rankings from AP poll

== 1986–87 ==
1986–87 Texas Tech Red Raiders basketball
- Conference: Southwest Conference
- Record: 15–14 (9–7 SWC)
- Head coach: Gerald Myers (17th season)
- Home arena: Lubbock Municipal Coliseum

1986–87 Southwest Conference men's basketball standings
	Conf.				Overall
Team	W		L	PCT	W		L	PCT
No. 19 TCU	14	–	2	.875	24	–	7	.774
Baylor	10	–	6	.625	18	–	13	.581
Houston	9	–	7	.563	18	–	12	.600
Texas Tech	9	–	7	.563	15	–	14	.517
Arkansas	8	–	8	.500	19	–	14	.576
SMU	7	–	9	.438	16	–	13	.552
Texas	7	–	9	.438	14	–	17	.452
Texas A&M †	6	–	10	.375	17	–	14	.548
Rice	2	–	14	.125	8	–	19	.296
† 1987 SWC tournament winner Rankings from AP Poll

== 1987–88 ==
1987–88 Texas Tech Red Raiders basketball
- Conference: Southwest Conference
- Record: 9–19 (4–12 SWC)
- Head coach: Gerald Myers (18th season)
- Home arena: Lubbock Municipal Coliseum

1987–88 Southwest Conference men's basketball standings
	Conf.				Overall
Team	W		L	PCT	W		L	PCT
SMU †	12	–	4	.750	28	–	7	.800
Arkansas	11	–	5	.688	21	–	9	.700
Baylor	11	–	5	.688	23	–	11	.676
Houston	10	–	6	.625	18	–	13	.581
Texas	10	–	6	.625	16	–	13	.552
Texas A&M	8	–	8	.500	16	–	15	.516
Texas Tech	4	–	12	.250	9	–	19	.321
TCU	3	–	13	.188	9	–	19	.321
Rice	3	–	13	.188	6	–	21	.222
† 1988 SWC tournament winner Rankings from AP Poll

== 1988–89 ==
1988–89 Texas Tech Red Raiders basketball
- Conference: Southwest Conference
- Record: 13–15 (8–8 SWC)
- Head coach: Gerald Myers (19th season)
- Home arena: Lubbock Municipal Coliseum

1988–89 Southwest Conference men's basketball standings
	Conf.				Overall
Team	W		L	PCT	W		L	PCT
Arkansas †	13	–	3	.813	25	–	7	.781
Texas	12	–	4	.750	25	–	9	.735
TCU	9	–	7	.563	17	–	13	.567
Houston	8	–	8	.500	17	–	14	.548
Texas A&M	8	–	8	.500	16	–	14	.533
Texas Tech	8	–	8	.500	13	–	15	.464
SMU	7	–	9	.438	13	–	16	.448
Rice	6	–	10	.375	12	–	16	.429
Baylor	1	–	15	.063	5	–	22	.185
† 1989 SWC tournament winner Rankings from AP Poll

== 1989–90 ==
1989–90 Texas Tech Red Raiders basketball
- Conference: Southwest Conference
- Record: 5–22 (0–16 SWC)
- Head coach: Gerald Myers (20th season)
- Home arena: Lubbock Municipal Coliseum

1989–90 Southwest Conference men's basketball standings
	Conf.				Overall
Team	W		L	PCT	W		L	PCT
No. 7 Arkansas †	14	–	2	.875	30	–	5	.857
Houston	13	–	3	.813	25	–	8	.758
Texas	12	–	4	.750	24	–	9	.727
TCU	9	–	7	.563	16	–	13	.552
Baylor	7	–	9	.438	16	–	14	.533
Texas A&M	7	–	9	.438	14	–	17	.452
Rice	5	–	11	.313	11	–	17	.393
SMU	5	–	11	.313	10	–	18	.357
Texas Tech	0	–	16	.000	5	–	22	.185
† 1990 SWC tournament winner Rankings from AP Poll

== 1990–91 ==
1990–91 Texas Tech Red Raiders basketball
- Conference: Southwest Conference
- Record: 8–23 (4–12 SWC)
- Head coach: Gerald Myers (21st season)
- Home arena: Lubbock Municipal Coliseum

1990–91 Southwest Conference men's basketball standings
	Conf.				Overall
Team	W		L	PCT	W		L	PCT
No. 2 Arkansas †	15	–	1	.938	34	–	4	.895
No. 23 Texas	13	–	3	.813	23	–	9	.719
Houston	10	–	6	.625	18	–	11	.621
TCU	9	–	7	.563	18	–	10	.643
Rice	9	–	7	.563	16	–	14	.533
SMU	6	–	10	.375	12	–	17	.414
Baylor	4	–	12	.250	12	–	15	.444
Texas Tech	4	–	12	.250	8	–	23	.258
Texas A&M	2	–	14	.125	8	–	21	.276
† 1991 SWC tournament winner Rankings from AP Poll
