= 1979–80 Texas A&M Aggies men's basketball team =

American college basketball season

1979–80 Texas A&M Aggies men's basketball

SWC Regular season and SWC tournament champions

NCAA tournament, Sweet Sixteen
- Conference: Southwest Conference

Ranking
- Coaches: No. 18
- Record: 26–8 (14–2 SWC)
- Head coach: Shelby Metcalf (17th season)
- Home arena: G. Rollie White Coliseum

1979–80 Southwest Conference men's basketball standings
	Conf.				Overall
Team	W		L	PCT	W		L	PCT
Texas A&M †	14	–	2	.875	26	–	8	.765
Arkansas	13	–	3	.813	21	–	8	.724
Texas	10	–	6	.625	19	–	11	.633
Texas Tech	8	–	8	.500	16	–	13	.552
Houston	8	–	8	.500	14	–	14	.500
SMU	7	–	9	.438	16	–	12	.571
Baylor	6	–	10	.375	11	–	16	.407
Rice	4	–	12	.250	7	–	19	.269
TCU	2	–	14	.125	7	–	19	.269
† 1980 SWC tournament winner Rankings from AP Poll

The 1979–80 Texas A&M Aggies men's basketball team represented Texas A&M University as a member of the Southwest Conference during the 1979–80 college basketball season. The team was led by head coach Shelby Metcalf and played their home games at G. Rollie White Coliseum in College Station, Texas. After finishing atop the conference regular season standings, the Aggies won the SWC tournament to receive the conference's automatic bid to the NCAA tournament. As No. 6 seed in the Midwest region, Texas A&M beat No. 11 seed Bradley in the opening round and upset No. 3 seed North Carolina in the second round before falling to No. 2 seed and eventual National champion Louisville in the Sweet Sixteen. The Aggies finished with a record of 26–8 (14–2 SWC).

== Roster ==
1979–80 Texas A&M Aggies men's basketball team
Players	Coaches
Pos. / # / Name / Height / Weight / Year / Hometown; F / 34 / Rynn Wright / 6 ft 6 in (1.98 m) / 225 lb (102 kg) / Jr	Head coach: Shelby Metcalf; Assistant coach(es) Legend: (C) Team captain; (S) Suspended; (I) Ineligible; (W) Walk-on; Injured; Current redshirt

== Schedule and results ==
Date time, TV	Rank^{#}	Opponent^{#}	Result	Record	Site (attendance) city, state
Regular season
Nov 30, 1979*	No. 14	vs. Iona; Great Alaska Shootout	L 52–78	0–1	Buckner Fieldhouse; Fort Richardson, Alaska
Dec 1, 1979*	No. 14	vs. Lamar; Great Alaska Shootout	L 60–61	0–2	Buckner Fieldhouse; Fort Richardson, Alaska
Dec 2, 1979*	No. 14	vs. Pacific; Great Alaska Shootout	W 82–66	1–2	Buckner Fieldhouse; Fort Richardson, Alaska
SWC Tournament
Feb 27, 1980*		vs. Texas Tech; Semifinals	W 61–51	23–7	HemisFair Arena; San Antonio, Texas
Feb 28, 1980*		vs. Arkansas; Championship game	W 52–50	24–7	HemisFair Arena; San Antonio, Texas
NCAA Tournament
Mar 7, 1980*	(6 MW)	vs. (11 MW) Bradley; First round	W 55–53	25–7	UNT Coliseum; Denton, Texas
Mar 8, 1980*	(6 MW)	vs. (3 MW) No. 15 North Carolina; Second round	W 78–61 ^{2OT}	26–7	UNT Coliseum; Denton, Texas
Mar 14, 1980*	(6 MW)	vs. (2 MW) No. 2 Louisville; Midwest Regional Semifinal – Sweet Sixteen	L 55–66 ^{OT}	26–8	The Summit; Houston, Texas
*Non-conference game. ^{#}Rankings from AP Poll. (#) Tournament seedings in parentheses. MW=Midwest. All times are in Central Time.
