= Shelby Metcalf =

American basketball coach (1930–2007)

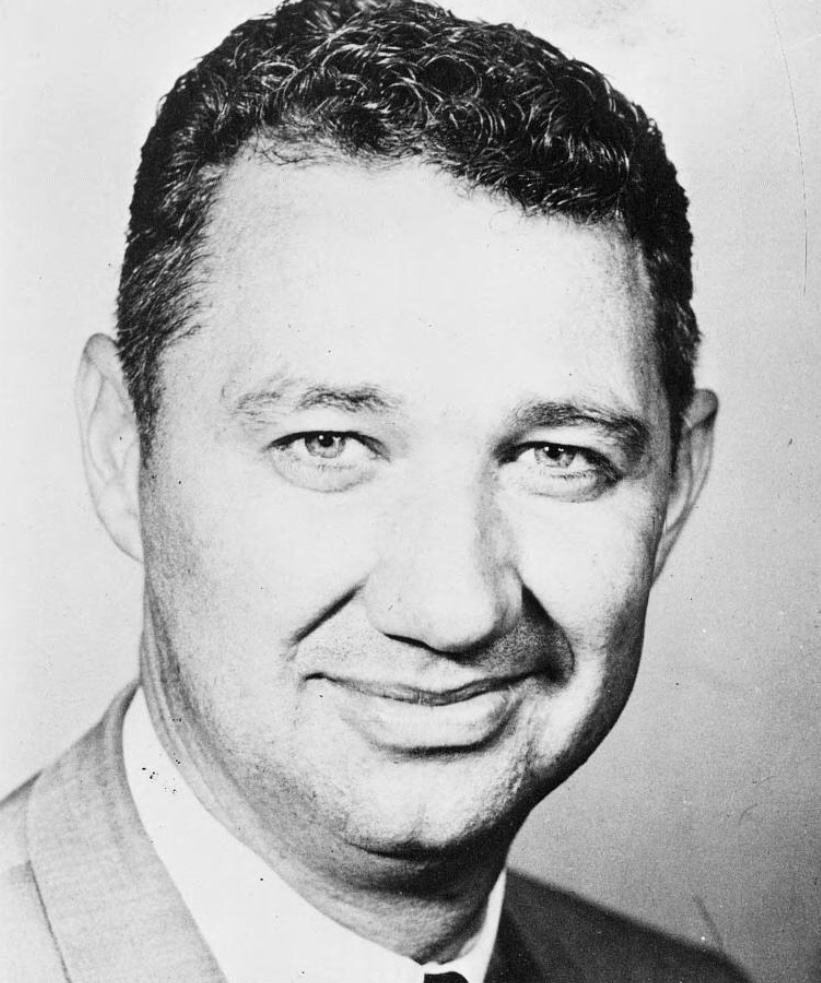
- Metcalf from the 1970 Aggieland

Biographical details
- Born: December 23, 1930; Tulsa, Oklahoma, U.S.
- Died: February 8, 2007 (aged 76); College Station, Texas, U.S.

Playing career
- 1952–1955: East Texas State
- Position: Guard

Coaching career (HC unless noted)
- 1955–1956: Cayuga HS (TX)
- 1956–1958: Sembach Air Base
- 1958–1963: Texas A&M (assistant)
- 1963–1990: Texas A&M

Head coaching record
- Overall: 438–306 (college); 33–10 (high school)
- Tournaments: 3–6 (NCAA Division I); 4–4 (NIT)

Accomplishments and honors

Championships
- 6 SWC regular season (1964, 1969, 1975, 1976, 1980, 1986); 2 SWC tournament (1980, 1987)

Awards
- Helms Foundation First Team (1953); Lone Star Conference Second Team (1953); NAIA Second Team (1954)

Shelby Metcalf (December 23, 1930 – February 8, 2007) was the head coach of the Texas A&M Aggies men's basketball team for 27 seasons, from 1963 to 1990. He won more games than any other coach in the former Southwest Conference. Achieving success as basketball coach at a university known more for its dedication to its football team, Metcalf endeared himself to Aggie fans for his loyalty to the school and his witticisms. Although his coaching career ended on a bitter note when he was fired in a dispute with A&M athletic director John David Crow in 1990, Metcalf remained loyal to Texas A&M University. He continued to live in the College Station community and supported the Aggie basketball coaches who succeeded him.

== Early years ==
Shelby R. Metcalf, Jr. grew up in Tulsa, Oklahoma and attended Tulsa Central High School. He attended A&M Junior College for one year before transferring to East Texas State (now East Texas A&M University), where he was an All-American guard and led the team to three NAIA national tournaments, twice being named to the all-tournament team. In his senior year in 1955, the team won the NAIA championship; the same year, Metcalf earned his bachelor's and master's degrees at ETSU.

After graduation, Metcalf spent one year as a head coach at Cayuga (Texas) High School, posting a 33–10 record. He then joined the United States Air Force, becoming the Athletic Officer at Sembach Air Base in Germany from 1956 to 1958. As a player and coach, he amassed a 78–17 record and won the All-Germany Championship twice.

== Coaching career ==
Metcalf joined the Texas A&M University men's basketball coaching staff in 1958 as the freshman coach under Bob Rogers, who had previously coached Metcalf at East Texas State University. For the next five years, Metcalf continued in that role, before replacing Rogers as head coach in 1963.

During his 26½ seasons with Texas A&M from 1963 to 1990, Metcalf won a total of 438 games, 239 of them in conference play, more than any other men's basketball coach in Southwest Conference history. His coaching record was 438–306, 239–158 in conference. Metcalf was known as "The King of Tournaments", for taking the Aggies to 74 in-season tournaments in order to ensure that the team would play at least one game each year on a neutral floor. In the 1989–90 season, the team made a record five tournament appearances.

In his first season as a head coach, Metcalf's team went 18–7, winning the Southwest Conference, the Aggies' first conference championship in 41 years. Metcalf's teams won a total of six conference championships (1964, 1969, 1975, 1976, 1980, 1986) and only placed lower than fourth in the conference six times. Under Metcalf, the A&M team made five NCAA tournament appearances, including two Sweet Sixteen appearances in 1969 (when only 25 teams were invited to the tournament) and 1980. The latter team won 26 games—a school record that stood until 2006-07—beating North Carolina in double overtime in the second round of the tournament before just missing advancing to the Elite Eight with an overtime loss to eventual champion Louisville.

Twenty-four of Metcalf's players earned first-team all-conference citations and John Beasley was named a first-team All-American by the Helms Foundation in 1966. Eighteen players were drafted by professional basketball leagues, including Sonny Parker, who was a 1976 first-round NBA draft pick. In 1971, the A&M men's basketball color barrier was broken when Metcalf personally convinced Mario Brown, an African-American player, to attend the school. Brown later earned second-team All-Southwest Conference honors and was selected as a team co-captain.

Metcalf's success prompted the primarily football-focused student body to begin paying attention to basketball. The A&M basketball arena, G. Rollie White Coliseum, often sold out and soon became known as the "Holler House on the Brazos". Metcalf took full advantage of the noisy arena, earning a doctorate in Recreation and Resource Development from Texas A&M in 1974 with a dissertation titled "Crowd Behavior at Southwest Conference Games".

The longest serving basketball coach in Southwest Conference history, Metcalf was fired after feuding with Athletic Director John David Crow midway through the 1989–1990 season. When asked by the media what happened between the two, Metcalf remarked, "I made a comment that I didn't think John David was all that bright. And I thought I was being generous." The next year the Aggies began what would grow into a fifteen-year basketball slump that included only one winning season. The team did not approach Metcalf's success until 2005, when A&M hired former UTEP coach Billy Gillispie. Gillispie reached out to Metcalf, inviting him to practices and encouraging him to attend the home games.

== Post-coaching career ==
After being relieved of his coaching duties, Metcalf worked for the A&M Center of Academic Enhancement. Until 1994, he often spoke at banquets, athletic events, and high schools, including three appearances at prison graduations, and was twice selected to Who's Who in American Colleges and Universities.

== Career honors ==
He was inducted into the Texas Sports Hall of Fame, the East Texas State Athletics Hall of Fame, the Texas Association of Basketball Coaches Hall of Fame, and the Texas A&M Athletics Hall of Fame. He was also elected into Phi Kappa Phi, one of the most prestigious honor societies in academia.

Metcalf had such a profound effect on Aggie basketball that during the 2006–2007 season, former Aggie coach Billy Gillispie began a tournament in his honor held in College Station, Texas, titled the Shelby Metcalf Classic.

Metcalf died on February 8, 2007, from cancer. He was survived by his widow, Janis, and their daughter, Shelley Metcalf Valerius.

== Head coaching record ==
Record table
Season	Team	Overall	Conference	Standing	Postseason
Texas A&M Aggies (Southwest Conference) (1963–1990)
1963–64	Texas A&M	18–7	13–1	1st	NCAA University Division First Round
1964–65	Texas A&M	14–10	7–7	4th	
1965–66	Texas A&M	15–9	10–4	2nd	
1966–67	Texas A&M	6–18	5–9	6th	
1967–68	Texas A&M	14–10	8–6	T–2nd	
1968–69	Texas A&M	18–9	12–2	1st	NCAA University Division Regional Semifinals
1969–70	Texas A&M	14–10	9–5	2nd	
1970–71	Texas A&M	9–17	5–9	7th	
1971–72	Texas A&M	16–10	9–5	T–3rd	
1972–73	Texas A&M	17–9	9–5	T–2nd	
1973–74	Texas A&M	15–11	7–7	4th	
1974–75	Texas A&M	20–7	12–2	1st	NCAA Division I First Round
1975–76	Texas A&M	21–6	14–2	1st	
1976–77	Texas A&M	14–14	8–8	T–4th	
1977–78	Texas A&M	12–15	5–11	7th	
1978–79	Texas A&M	24–9	11–5	3rd	NIT Quarterfinals
1979–80	Texas A&M	26–8	14–2	1st	NCAA Division I Sweet 16
1980–81	Texas A&M	15–12	8–8	T–4th	
1981–82	Texas A&M	20–11	10–6	3rd	NIT Quarterfinals
1982–83	Texas A&M	17–14	10–6	3rd	
1983–84	Texas A&M	16–14	7–9	5th	
1984–85	Texas A&M	19–11	10–6	T–2nd	NIT First Round
1985–86	Texas A&M	20–12	12–4	T–1st	NIT First Round
1986–87	Texas A&M	17–14	6–10	8th	NCAA Division I First Round
1987–88	Texas A&M	16–15	8–8	6th	
1988–89	Texas A&M	16–14	8–8	T–4th	
1989–90	Texas A&M	9–10‡	2–3‡		
Texas A&M:		438–306	239–158		
Total:		438–306			
National champion Postseason invitational champion Conference regular season champion Conference regular season and conference tournament champion Division regular season champion Division regular season and conference tournament champion Conference tournament champion

‡ Partial season; released after 19 games
