= John Floyd (basketball) =

American basketball coach

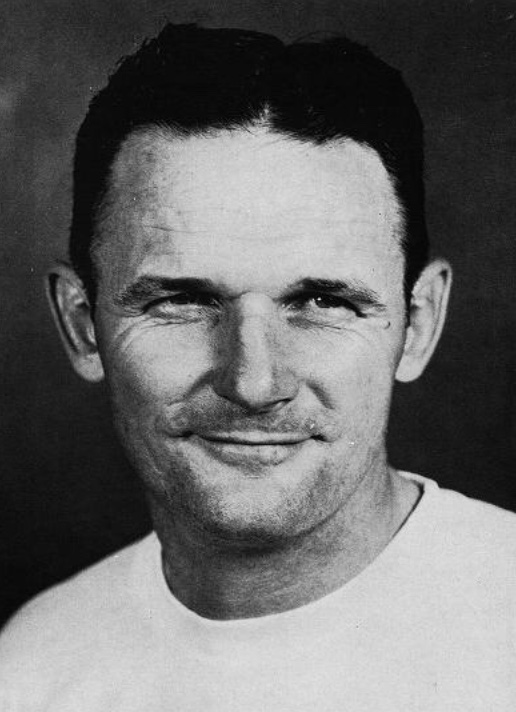
- Floyd from the 1955 Aggieland.

Coaching career (HC unless noted)
- 1949–1950: Arkansas–Little Rock
- 1950–1955: Texas A&M

Accomplishments and honors

Championships
- SWC Championship (1951)

John Floyd was a college basketball coach. He was the head coach of Texas A&M from 1950 to 1955. He coached Texas A&M to a 38-82 record, winning one Southwest Conference championship and one NCAA tournament appearance.

== Coaching career ==
=== Arkansas–Little Rock ===
Floyd has his coaching start at Arkansas–Little Rock.

=== Texas A&M ===
In 1950, Floyd became the head coach for the Texas A&M Aggies, replacing Marty Karow who left to become the baseball coach for Ohio State. When he came in, he brought in a style of play known as "ball control". "Ball control", popularized by Henry Iba, emphasized passing, close shots, low-scoring, and good defense. They finished that season in a three-way tie for first place in the conference.

Floyd's last season would be 1954–55, as the Aggies finished with only four wins. He resigned when the season ended.

== Head coaching record ==
Record table
Season	Team	Overall	Conference	Standing	Postseason
Texas A&M Aggies (Southwest Conference) (1950–1955)
1950–51	Texas A&M	17-12	8-4	T-1st	NCAA First Round
1951–52	Texas A&M	9-15	5-7	T-3rd	
1952–53	Texas A&M	6-15	3-9	7th	
1953–54	Texas A&M	2-20	1-11	7th	
1954–55	Texas A&M	4-20	1-11	7th	
Texas A&M:		38–82 (.317)	18–42 (.300)		
Total:		38–82 (.317)			
National champion Postseason invitational champion Conference regular season champion Conference regular season and conference tournament champion Division regular season champion Division regular season and conference tournament champion Conference tournament champion
