= G. Rollie White Coliseum =

Indoor arena in College Station, Texas

Coordinates: 30.611323°N 96.340023°W

- "The Holler House on the Brazos" "Jollie Rollie"
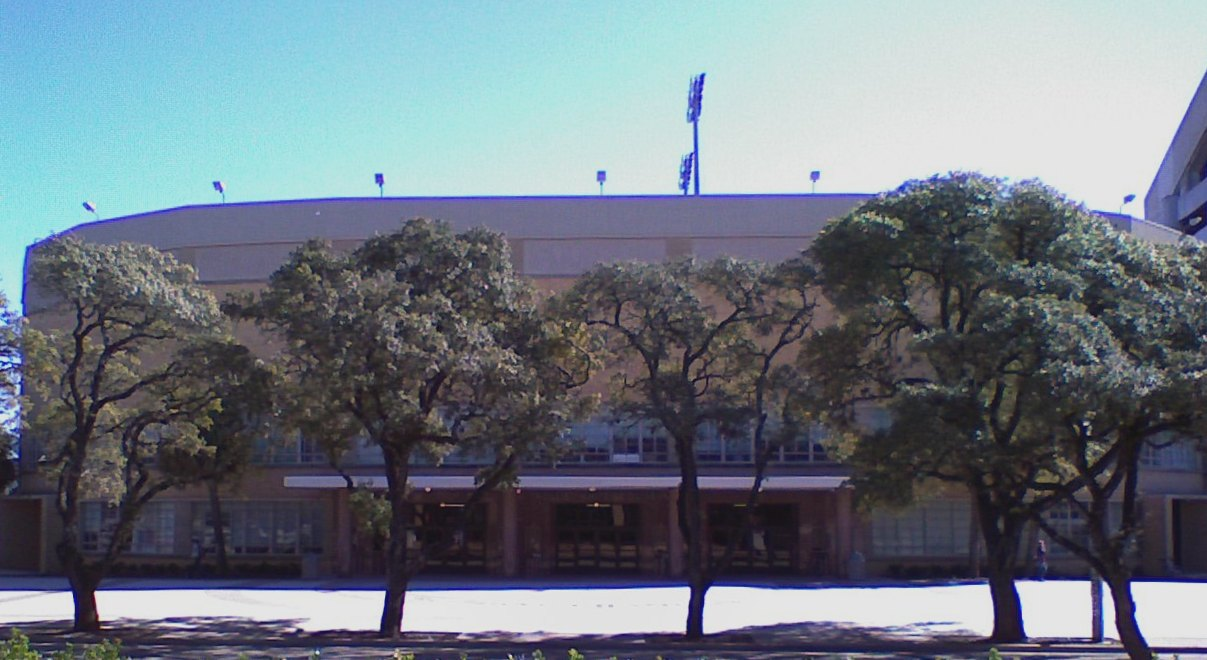
- Interactive map of G. Rollie White Coliseum
- Location: Texas A&M University; College Station, TX 77843
- Owner: Texas A&M University
- Operator: Texas A&M University
- Capacity: 7,800

Construction
- Opened: 1954
- Closed: 2013
- Demolished: 2013

Tenants
- Texas A&M Aggies basketball (NCAA) (1954–1998); Texas A&M Aggies volleyball (NCAA) (1975–2008)

The G. Rollie White Coliseum was an on-campus arena at Texas A&M University in College Station, Texas, in the United States. Often referred to as the "Jollie Rollie" or "The Holler House on the Brazos", the arena was the home of Texas A&M's Aggie volleyball team, which played there since its inception in 1975 until 2009. Before the building of Reed Arena in 1998, G. Rollie White was also the home to the men's and women's basketball teams. Demolition of the Coliseum in August, 2013 made way for the redevelopment of Kyle Field.

The building was built in 1954, and was located directly to the northeast of Kyle Field. The U-shaped building seated 7,800 in the main grandstand on three sides, with a small auxiliary bleacher section on the flat end of the building. The sandstone exterior was originally visible outside the northern corner of the field.

The renovation of the Memorial Student Center (MSC), directly to the north of where the coliseum stood, required the relocation of the campus bookstore, which occupied the arena floor at G. Rollie from the summer of 2009 until April 2012 when the MSC reopened. G. Rollie White hosted the NCAA volleyball tournament ten times.

In November 2012, the request for proposal to renovate Kyle Field called for the demolition of G. Rollie White. Began in August 2013, the demolition resulted in the removal of nine dual basketball-volleyball courts, fourteen racquetball-handball courts, four activity rooms, several classrooms, meeting rooms, and offices, although some of these were from the adjacent Read Building, which was also razed.

John David Crow, former Aggie football player and athletic director, regarded the demise of G. Rollie White as a farewell to an old friend: "I hate to see anything demolished." Crow was present when G. Rollie White opened to replace DeWare Field House.
