= Erhart & Eichenbaum =

American architectural firm

Erhart & Eichenbaum GHN Architects & Engineers

Practice information
- Partners: Frank J. Erhart AIA; Howard S. Eichenbaum FAIA; John A. Rauch AIA; Noland Blass Jr. FAIA; Lugean L. Chilcote FAIA; Gulley Carter PE; Richard L. Lanford PE; Jerry C. Wilcox FAIA; William J. Gaskin AIA; Henry D. Bogart PE; Joe C. Norcross AIA; Charles C. Hill Jr. AIA
- Founders: Erhart and Eichenbaum
- Founded: 1930
- Location: Little Rock, Arkansas; Springfield, Missouri

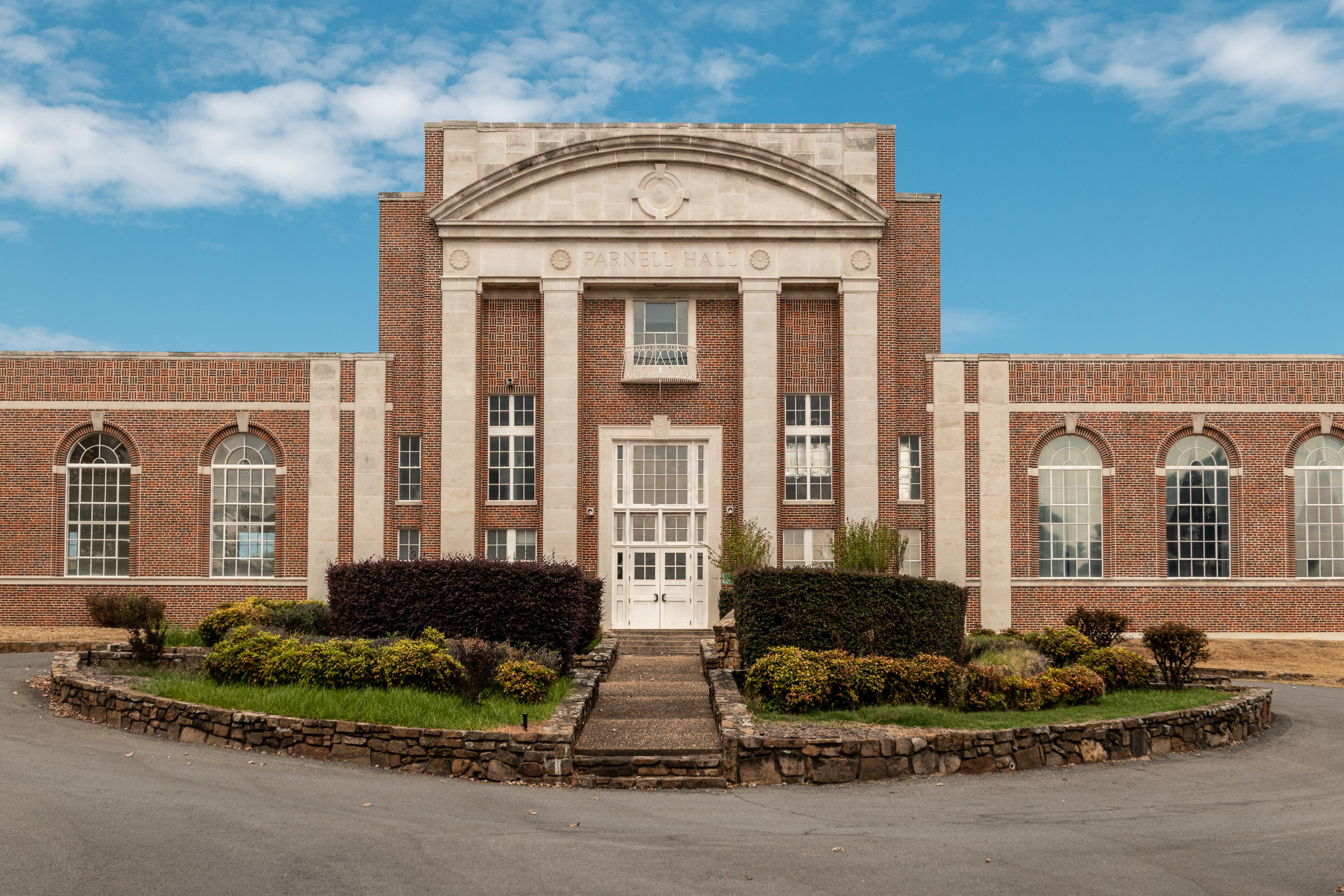
Parnell Hall of the Arkansas School for the Deaf, designed by Erhart & Eichenbaum and completed in 1931.

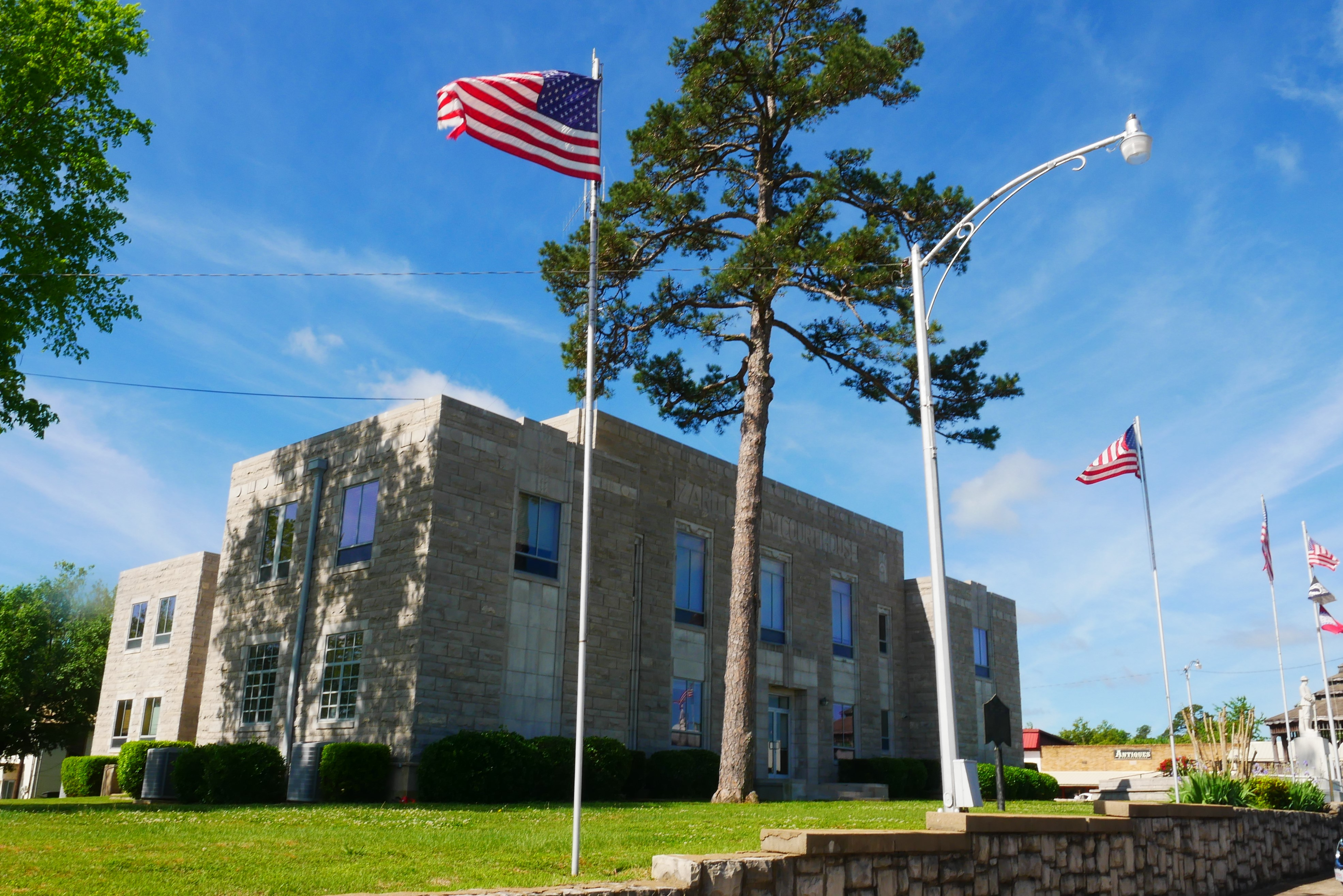
The Izard County Courthouse in Melbourne, designed by Erhart & Eichenbaum and completed in 1940.

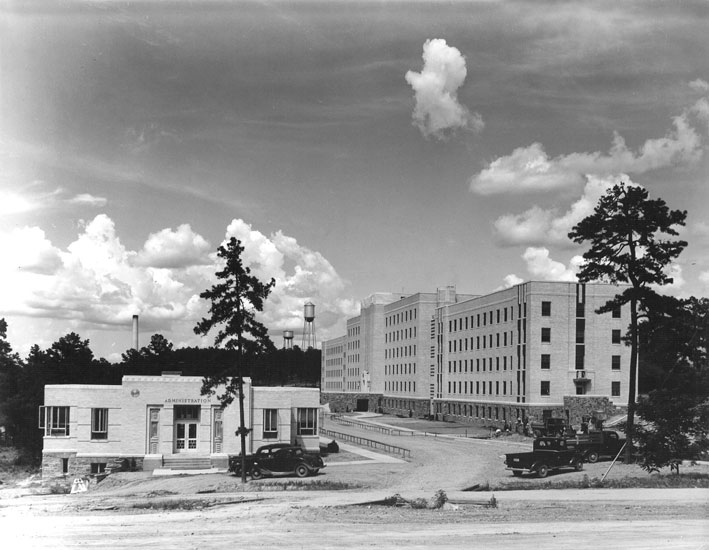
The Administration and Nyberg Buildings of the Arkansas Tuberculosis Sanatorium, designed by Haralson & Mott and Erhart & Eichenbaum and completed in 1941.

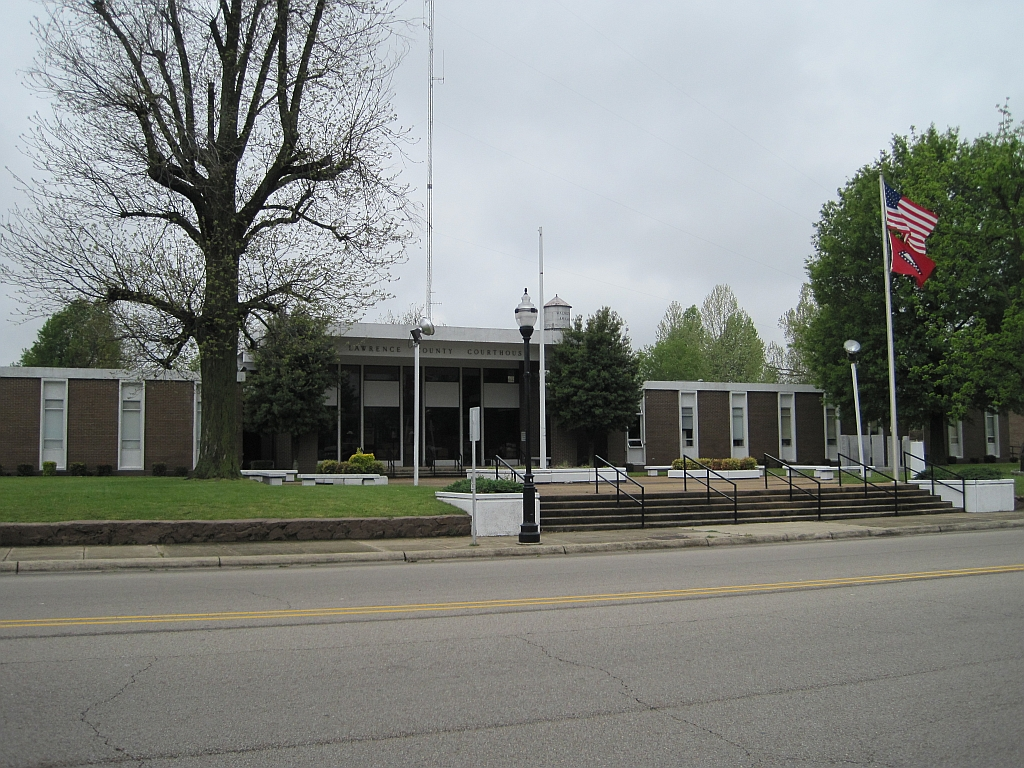
The Lawrence County Courthouse in Walnut Ridge, designed by Erhart, Eichenbaum, Rauch & Blass and completed in 1966.

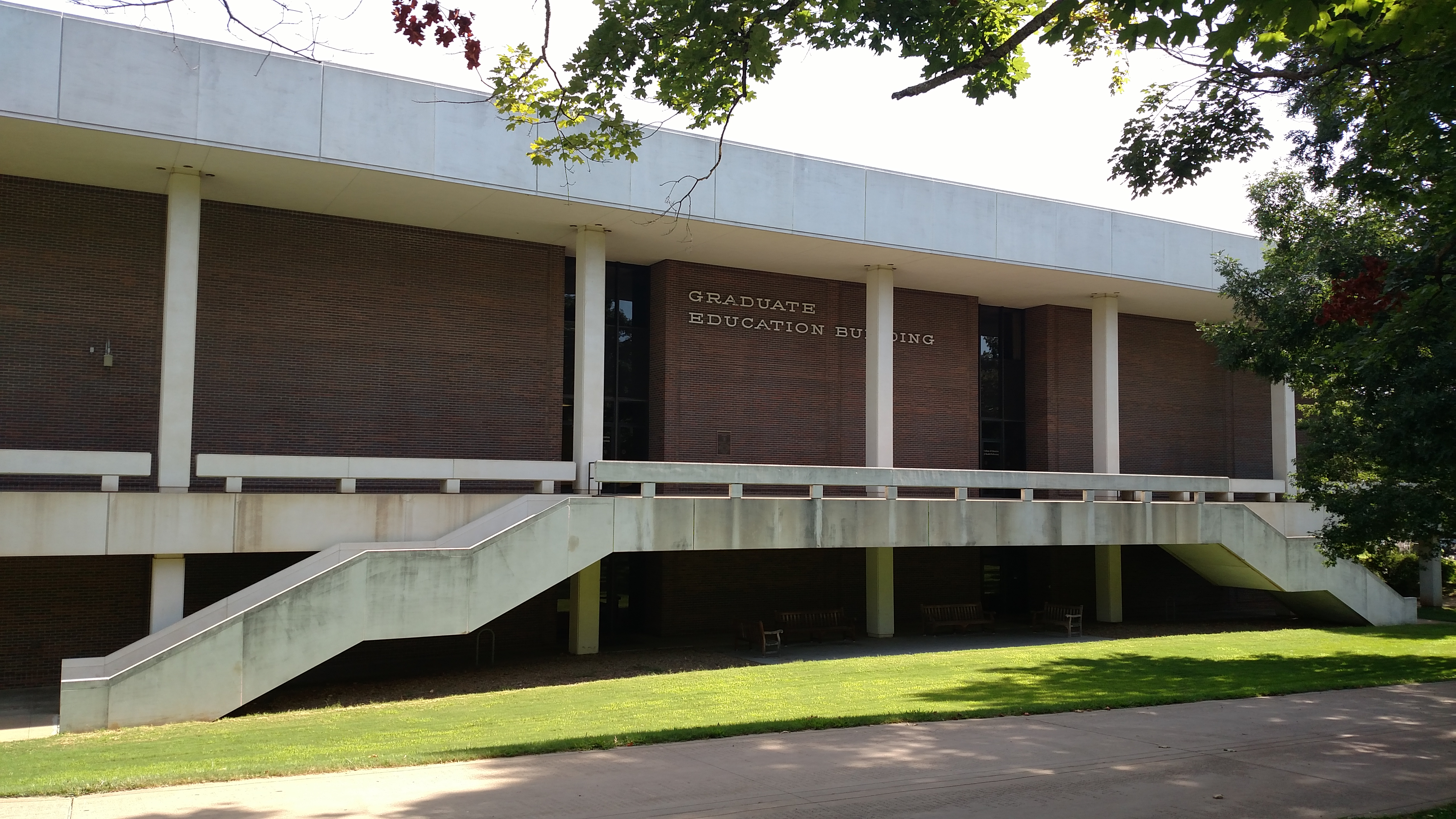
The Graduate Education Building of the University of Arkansas, designed by Erhart, Eichenbaum, Rauch & Blass and completed in 1968.

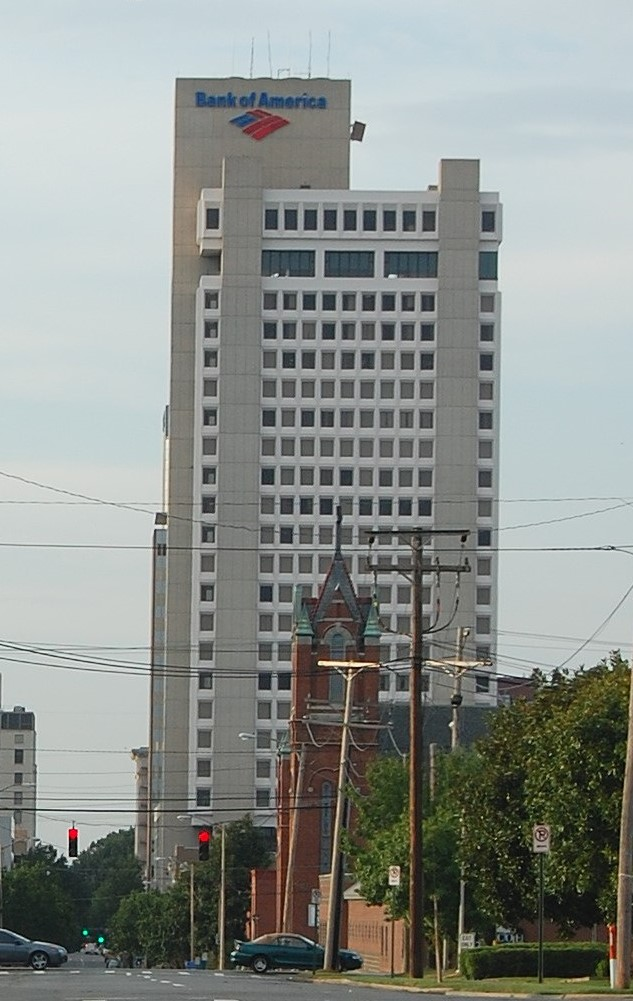
Bank of America Plaza in Little Rock, designed by Erhart, Eichenbaum, Rauch & Blass and completed in 1969.

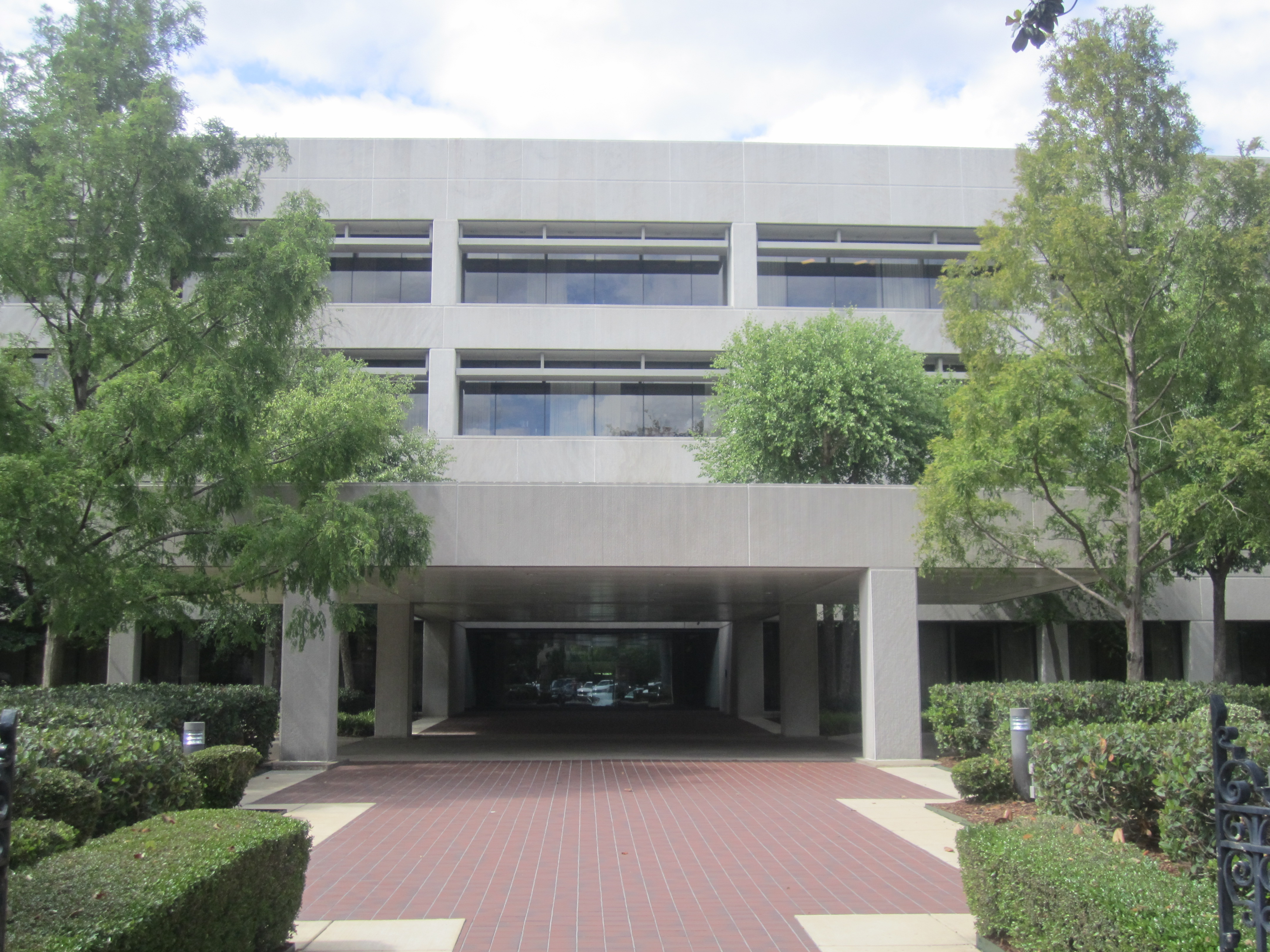
The former headquarters of Murphy Oil in El Dorado, designed by Blass, Chilcote, Carter, Lanford & Wilcox and completed in 1983.

Erhart & Eichenbaum, now known as GHN Architects & Engineers, is an American architectural firm. It was founded in Little Rock, Arkansas in 1930 by architects Frank J. Erhart and Howard S. Eichenbaum. The partnership was later expanded to include architects Noland Blass Jr., Lugean L. Chilcote, Jerry C. Wilcox and others. The firm was incorporated in 1980 and established a second office in Springfield, Missouri in 1981. In 2003 the two offices became independent, and only the Springfield office is still active. The firm was historically responsible for major works in and around Arkansas and is best known for the work completed by the founders and by Blass.

== History ==
Erhart and Eichenbaum both began their architectural careers in 1920 as drafters in the office of Mann & Stern, the Little Rock architecture firm of George R. Mann and Eugene J. Stern. In 1927 Stern bought out Mann, and Erhart and Eichenbaum continued with him. They later proposed to buy shares of the firm, which was refused by Stern, and in 1930 they left to establish the partnership of Erhart & Eichenbaum. Depression-era projects included three county courthouses and a major expansion of the Arkansas Tuberculosis Sanatorium. During World War II the firm was involved in government work, and was part of a coalition of four firms which designed Camp Como (1943) in Mississippi, a POW camp for Germans and Italians.

Architect John A. Rauch became a partner in 1945, and the firm was renamed Erhart, Eichenbaum & Rauch. In 1955 Noland Blass Jr., an associate since 1946, was also made a partner, and the firm was renamed Erhart, Eichenbaum, Rauch & Blass. Blass spent his entire architectural career with the firm, and was responsible for setting the firm's high design standards. Blass' major projects for the firm include the former Veterans Administration Hospital (1950), the UAMS Medical Center (1956), the Justice Building (1957) and Bank of America Plaza (1969) in Little Rock and the George Howard Jr. Federal Building and United States Courthouse (1967) in Pine Bluff.

Erhart and Rauch had retired by 1970, and new partners by that time included engineer Edgar K. Riddick Jr. and architect Lugean L. Chilcote. In 1973, with Eichenbaum's death, the firm was reorganized as Erhart, Eichenbaum, Rauch, Blass & Chilcote. At this time Blass took over as senior partner, delegating more design responsibility to his younger partners. In 1976 the firm was renamed Blass, Riddick, Chilcote and the partnership was expanded to include engineers Gulley Carter and Richard L. Lanford and architect Jerry C. Wilcox. Riddick withdrew in 1978 and in 1980 the firm was incorporated as Blass, Chilcote, Carter, Lanford & Wilcox.

In 1981 the firm acquired Harold A. Casey & Associates of Springfield, Missouri, which became a subsidiary of the firm under the name BCCLW/Casey. This was changed to BCCW/Casey in 1985, to Casey/Hill in 1988 and to Hill & Bixler in 1992. The local partner, after the retirements of Harold and Allen Casey, was Charles C. Hill Jr.

Lanford and Wilcox withdrew in 1985 and 1988, respectively, and the firm was renamed first to Blass, Chilcote, Carter & Wilcox and second to Blass, Chilcote, Carter, Gaskin, Bogart & Norcross. Blass retired in 1990, followed by Chilcote in 1999. In the meantime, in 1998, the firm was renamed Gaskin Hill Norcross, with the two offices bearing the same name for the first time. At the time the senior principals were William J. Gaskin, Hill and Joe C. Norcross. In 2003 Hill and other associates bought the Missouri corporation from the Arkansas one, and both began operating independently. It operated under the Gaskin Hill Norcross name until 2005, when it was renamed GHN Architects & Engineers. The Arkansas firm was dissolved after the death of then-president Gaskin in 2007, leaving GHN of Springfield as the successors to the Erhart & Eichenbaum legacy.

== Partner biographies ==
=== Frank J. Erhart ===
Francis James "Frank" Erhart AIA (March 9, 1889 – January 14, 1979) was born in Hot Springs, Arkansas. He was educated at Regis College, now Regis University, in Denver, and at the University of Pennsylvania, though he did not earn a degree.

He was married in 1915 and had two children. He died in Little Rock at the age of 89.

=== Howard S. Eichenbaum ===
Howard Samuel Eichenbaum FAIA (April 25, 1904 – February 13, 1973) was born in Little Rock. He was educated in the Little Rock public schools and at Washington University in St. Louis, from which he graduated in 1924 with a BArch. He had worked summers for Mann & Stern in Little Rock and joined them full time after his graduation.

Eichenbaum was a prime mover behind the establishment of an Arkansas chapter of the American Institute of Architects (AIA) and the enactment of an architectural registration law in Arkansas. He served as AIA chapter president and was the first Arkansan to be elected a director, a vice president and a Fellow of the AIA. He also served as president of the Arkansas State Board of Architects, which the registration law established in 1941, and on the planning commissions for Little Rock and North Little Rock and for Metroplan.

Eichenbaum was married in 1929 and had three children. He was Jewish and was a vice president of his congregation, B’nai Israel. He died in Little Rock at the age of 68.

=== John A. Rauch ===
John Alexander Rauch AIA (October 11, 1891 – July 8, 1990) was born in St. James, Missouri. Like Eichenbaum he was educated at Washington University. He worked for Mann & Stern from 1917 until 1920, when he opened an independent office. He joined Erhart & Eichenbaum in 1941.

Rauch was married in 1924 and had four children. He died in Little Rock at the age of 98.

=== Noland Blass Jr. ===
Noland Blass Jr. FAIA (May 20, 1920 – July 21, 1998) was born in Little Rock. He was the grandson of Gustave Blass, who founded the Gus Blass Department Store in 1871. He was educated at Cornell University, graduating in 1941 with a BArch, and served in the army corps of engineers during World War II. After the war he joined Erhart, Eichenbaum & Rauch and was made an associate in 1946.

Blass was married in 1947 to Elizabeth Weitzenhoffer and had two children, both daughters. He died in Little Rock at the age of 78.

=== Lugean L. Chilcote ===
Lugean Lester Chilcote FAIA (January 14, 1929 – September 21, 2015) was born in Oklahoma City and was raised in Little Rock. He was educated at the University of Arkansas, graduating in 1951 with a BArch. He worked for Little Rock architects Ken Cole Jr. and Swaim & Allen until 1958, when he joined Erhart, Eichenbaum, Rauch & Blass.

Chilcote was married in 1953 to Clara Dudis and had four children. He died in Little Rock at the age of 86.

== Legacy ==
Erhart & Eichenbaum was historically one of the largest architectural firms in the region. Its principals were closely involved in their local community, and in the larger architectural community.

At least ten buildings designed by Erhart & Eichenbaum and its successors have been listed on the United States National Register of Historic Places, and others contribute to listed historic districts.

== Architectural works ==
=== Erhart & Eichenbaum, 1930–1945 ===
- 1931 – Parnell Hall, (Note: NRHP-listed.) Arkansas School for the Deaf, Little Rock, Arkansas
- 1931 – Spanish Court Apartments, (Note: A contributing resource to the Hillcrest Historic District, NRHP-listed in 1990.) 808 N Palm St, Little Rock, Arkansas
- 1934 – Van Buren County Courthouse, 273 Main St, Clinton, Arkansas
- 1936 – Dyess Colony, Dyess, Arkansas
- 1939 – Howard County Courthouse, 421 N Main St, Nashville, Arkansas
- 1939 – Reynolds Science Center, (Note: Originally named McElhannon Hall. A contributing resource to the Henderson State University Historic District, NRHP-listed in 2023.) Henderson State University, Arkadelphia, Arkansas
- 1940 – Izard County Courthouse, 80 E Main St, Melbourne, Arkansas
- 1941 – Arkansas Tuberculosis Sanatorium, (Note: Designed by Haralson & Mott and Erhart & Eichenbaum, associated architects. Their buildings are contributing resources to the Arkansas Tuberculosis Sanatorium Historic District, NRHP-listed in 2006.) Booneville, Arkansas
- 1943 – Camp Como, (Note: Designed by the Associated Architects and Engineers for Governmental Service, made up of architects H. Ray Burks, Erhart & Eichenbaum, Wittenberg & Delony and Theodore M. Sanders and engineers MacCrea–Bair–Lefever.) Panola County, Mississippi

=== Erhart, Eichenbaum & Rauch, 1945–1955 ===
- 1946 – Terminal and administration building, Memorial Field Airport, Hot Springs, Arkansas
- 1950 – Veterans Administration Hospital (former), (Note: Designed by Erhart, Eichenbaum & Rauch and Brueggeman, Swaim & Allen, associated architects. NRHP-listed.) 300 E Roosevelt Rd, Little Rock, Arkansas
- 1952 – Barton Coliseum, 2600 Howard St, Little Rock, Arkansas
- 1952 – Noland Blass Jr. House, 217 Normandy Rd, Little Rock, Arkansas
- 1954 – Marian Hall, Mount St. Mary Academy, Little Rock, Arkansas
- 1954 – St. Vincent Infirmary, 2 St Vincent Cir, Little Rock, Arkansas
- 1955 – Mann Arts and Science Magnet Middle School, 1000 E Roosevelt Rd, Little Rock, Arkansas
- 1956 – UAMS Medical Center, (Note: Designed by Erhart, Eichenbaum & Rauch and Edward Durell Stone, associated architects.) 4301 W Markham St, Little Rock, Arkansas

=== Erhart, Eichenbaum, Rauch & Blass, 1955–1973 ===
- 1956 – Erhart, Eichenbaum, Rauch & Blass office building, 201 S Chester St, Little Rock, Arkansas
- 1957 – Justice Building, 625 Marshall St, Little Rock, Arkansas
- 1958 – Darragh Building, 1403 E 6th Ave, Little Rock, Arkansas
- 1960 – Barton Research Building, University of Arkansas for Medical Sciences, Little Rock, Arkansas
- 1962 – First Christian Church, 14411 Taylor Loop Rd, Little Rock, Arkansas
- 1963 – Calhoun's Department Store, (Note: Designed by Erhart, Eichenbaum, Rauch & Blass, architects, with Zaroor & Davis of Muskogee, associate architects.) 201 W Broadway St, Muskogee, Oklahoma
- 1964 – Boy Scouts of America Quapaw Area Council building, Little Rock, Arkansas
- 1964 – Sam and Shirley Strauss House, 4 Sunset Dr, Cammack Village, Arkansas
- 1965 – Lakewood house, 4801 N Hills Blvd, North Little Rock, Arkansas
- 1965 – Hill Wheatley Downtowner Motor Inn, 135 Central Ave, Hot Springs, Arkansas
- 1966 – Felix Goodson Library, Williams Baptist University, Walnut Ridge, Arkansas
- 1966 – Lawrence County Courthouse, 315 W Main St, Walnut Ridge, Arkansas
- 1966 – Southwestern Bell building, 1111 W Capitol Ave, Little Rock
- 1967 – George Howard Jr. Federal Building and United States Courthouse, 100 E 8th Ave, Pine Bluff, Arkansas
- 1968 – Graduate Education Building, University of Arkansas, Fayetteville
- 1968 – IBM office building, 1610 E Sunshine St, Springfield, Missouri
- 1969 – Bank of America Plaza, 200 W Capitol Ave, Little Rock, Arkansas
- 1974 – Baptist Health Medical Center, 9601 Baptist Health Dr, Little Rock, Arkansas

=== Erhart, Eichenbaum, Rauch, Blass & Chilcote, 1973–1976 ===
- 1975 – Congregation B’nai Israel, 3700 N Rodney Parham Rd, Little Rock, Arkansas
- 1975 – Mabee Fine Arts Center, Ouachita Baptist University, Arkadelphia, Arkansas
- 1977 – Education Building Two, University of Arkansas for Medical Sciences, Little Rock, Arkansas

=== Blass, Riddick, Chilcote, 1976–1980 ===
- 1978 – Metro Center Mall, (Note: Designed by Cromwell, Neyland, Truemper, Levy & Gatchell and Blass, Riddick, Chilcote, associated architects. A pedestrian mall along Main Street from 3rd to 8th, later removed.) Main St, Little Rock, Arkansas
- 1979 – Mabee Chapel and Pike Auditorium, Southwest Baptist University, Bolivar, Missouri
- 1980 – Statehouse Convention Center, 101 La Harpe Blvd, Little Rock, Arkansas
- 1981 – Tri-City Jewish Center (former), 2715 30th St, Rock Island, Illinois

=== Blass, Chilcote, Carter, Lanford & Wilcox Inc., 1980–1985 ===
- 1982 – Little Rock Marriott, 3 Statehouse Plaza, Little Rock, Arkansas
- 1983 – Murphy Oil headquarters (former), 200 E Peace St, El Dorado, Arkansas

=== Blass, Chilcote, Carter, Gaskin, Bogart & Norcross, 1988–1998 ===
- 1989 – UAMS Winthrop P. Rockefeller Cancer Institute, 449 Jack Stephens Dr, Little Rock, Arkansas
- 1994 – Peoples Bank and Trust Company building, 105 E 9th St, Mountain Home, Arkansas

=== Gaskin Hill Norcross, from 1998 ===
- 2002 – Donald W. Reynolds Center for Business and Economic Development, University of Arkansas at Little Rock, Little Rock, Arkansas
