= Parnell Hall =

Parnell Hall may refer to:

- Parnell Hall (Little Rock, Arkansas), listed on the National Register of Historic Places in Arkansas
- Parnell Hall (writer), a writer
