= Sam and Shirley Strauss House =

Historic house in Arkansas, United States

- U.S. National Register of Historic Places
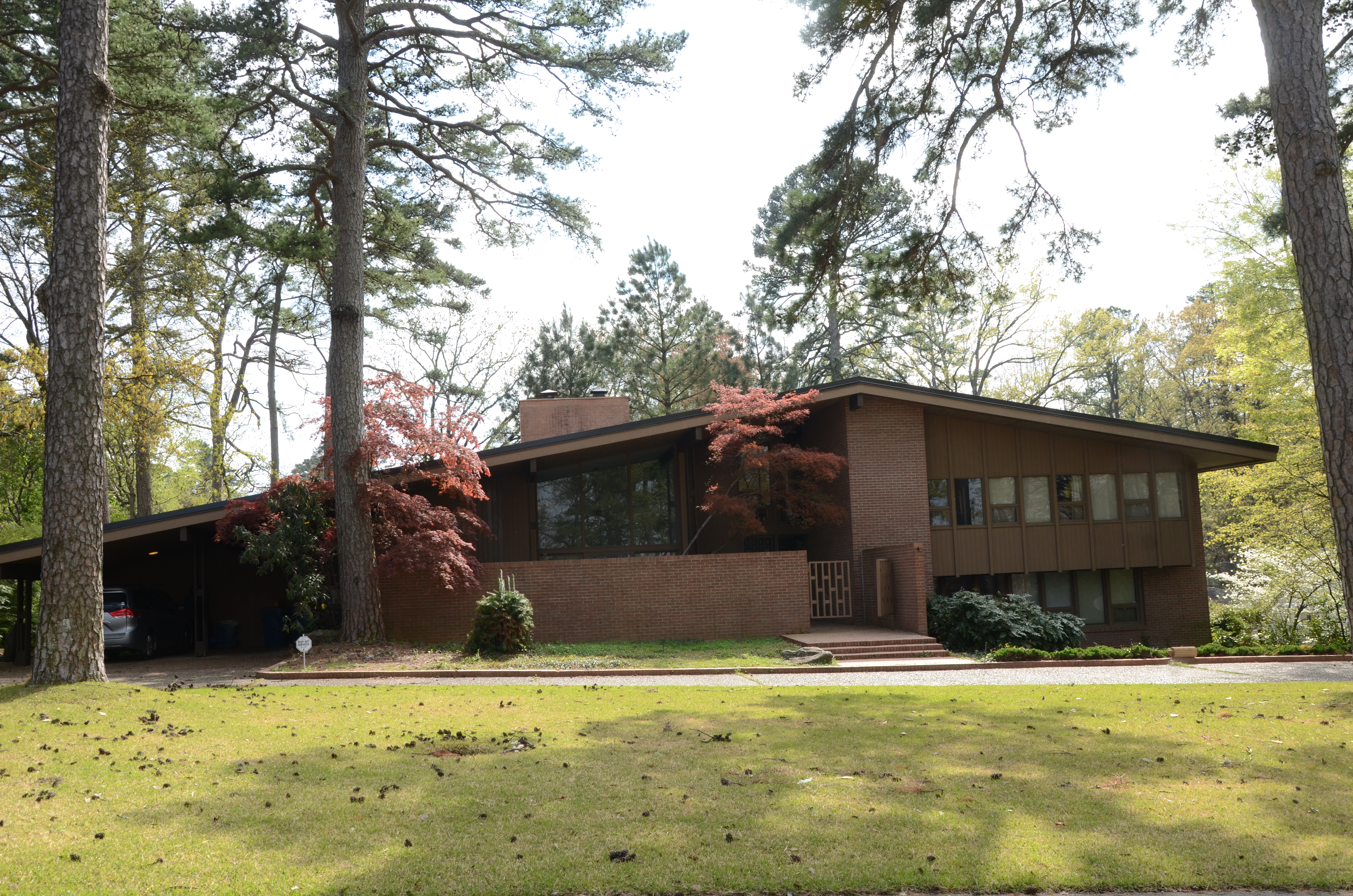

- Location within Arkansas Location within the United States
- Location: 4 Sunset Dr., Cammack Village, Arkansas
- Coordinates: 34°47′2″N 92°20′53″W
- Area: less than one acre
- Built: 1963
- Architect: Noland Blass Jr.
- Architectural style: Mid-Century Modern
- NRHP reference No.: 15000634
- Added to NRHP: September 28, 2015

The Sam and Shirley Strauss House is a historic house at 4 Sunset Drive in Cammack Village, Arkansas. It is a single story structure built out of a combination of brick and wood, with a broad shallow-pitch sloping roof. The roof extends on the east side to cover an open carport. At one point in the roof there is a gap, originally made for a tree standing on the property at the time of the house's construction. The exterior is clad in vertical redwood siding, with a variety of window configurations. The house, designed by Little Rock architect Noland Blass Jr., and built in 1963–64, is an excellent regional example of Mid-Century Modern architecture.

The house was listed on the National Register of Historic Places in 2015.

== See also ==
- National Register of Historic Places listings in Pulaski County, Arkansas
