= Lawrence County Courthouse =

Lawrence County Courthouse may refer to:

- Lawrence County Courthouse (Arkansas), Walnut Ridge
- Lawrence County Courthouse (Illinois), Lawrenceville, Illinois
- Lawrence County Courthouse (Missouri), Mount Vernon, Missouri
- Lawrence County Courthouse (Mississippi), Monticello, Mississippi
- Lawrence County Courthouse (Ohio), Ironton, Ohio
- Lawrence County Courthouse (Pennsylvania), New Castle, Pennsylvania
