= Ralph O. Mott =

American architect (1903–1997)

- Born: May 30, 1903; Stark, Harrison Township, Mahaska County, Iowa
- Died: December 29, 1997 (aged 94); Cumberland, Maryland
- Occupation: Architect
- Awards: Fellow, American Institute of Architects (1966); Fay Jones Gold Medal Award (1983)

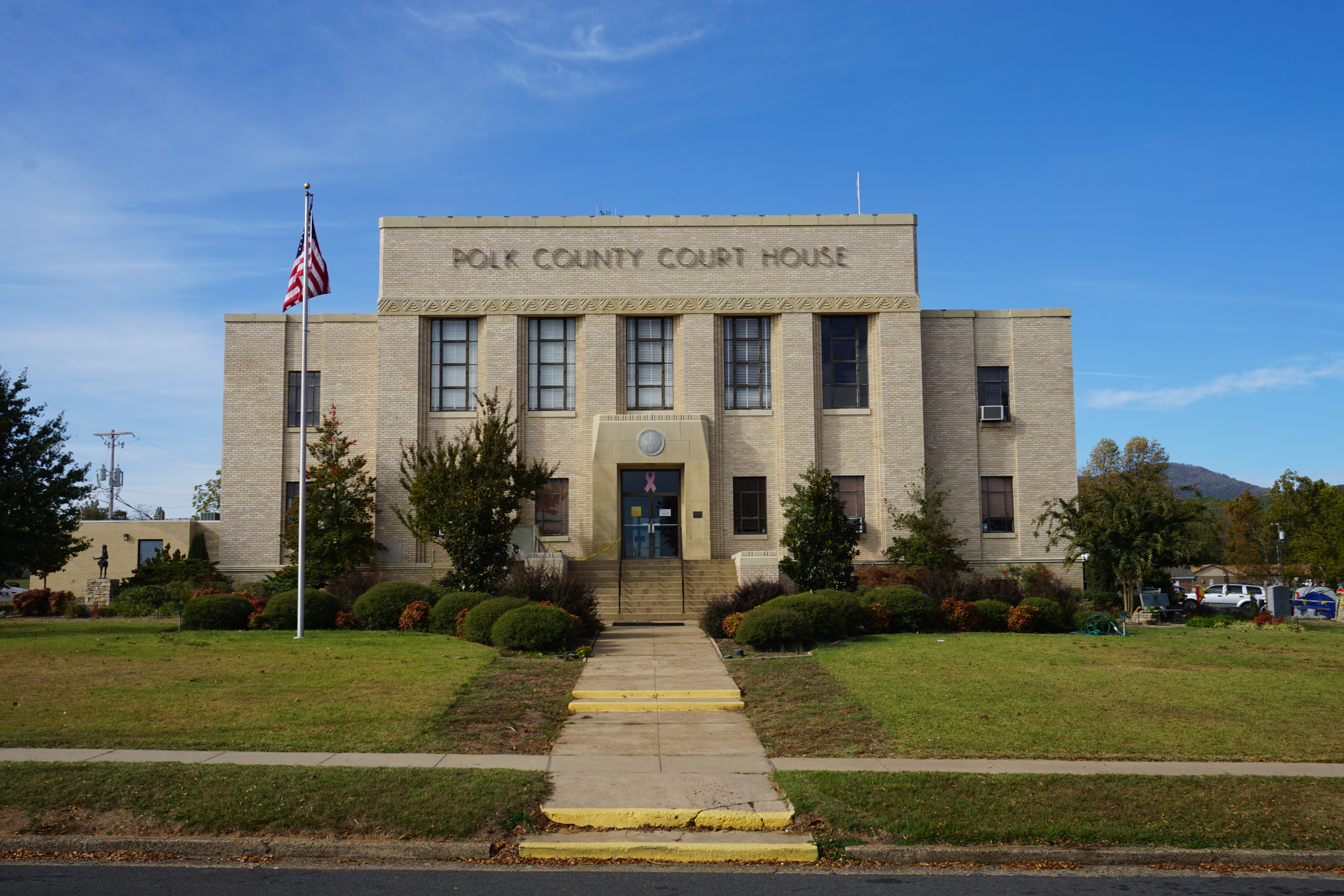
The Polk County Courthouse in Mena, Arkansas, designed by Haralson & Mott and completed in 1939.

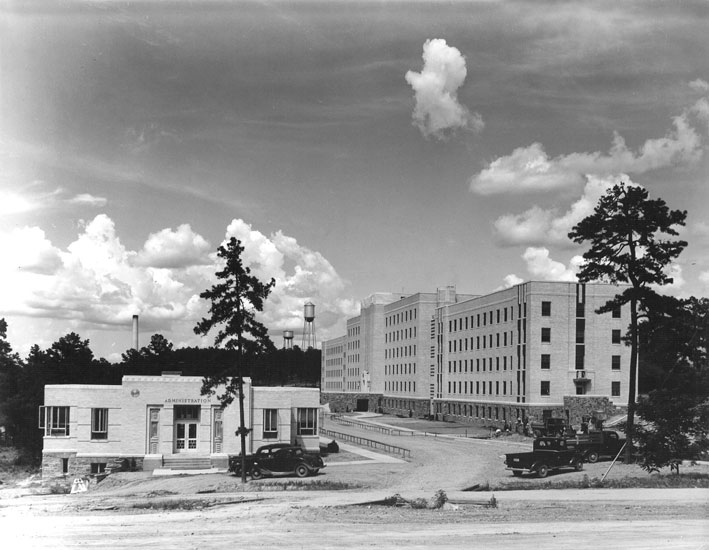
The Administration and Nyberg Buildings of the Arkansas Tuberculosis Sanatorium, designed by associated architects Haralson & Mott and Erhart & Eichenbaum and completed in 1941.

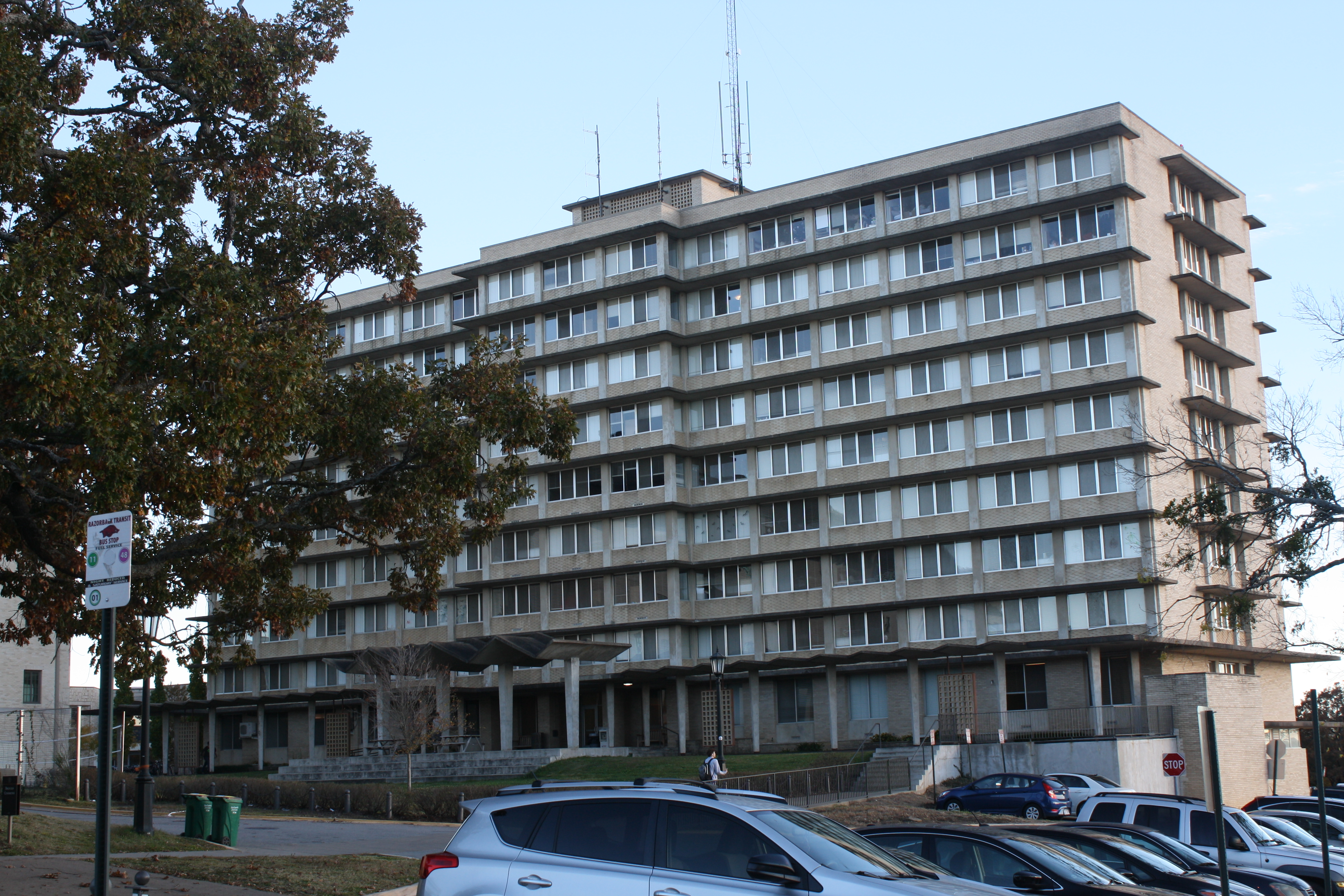
Humphreys Hall of the University of Arkansas, designed by Mott, Mobley & Horstman and completed in 1961.

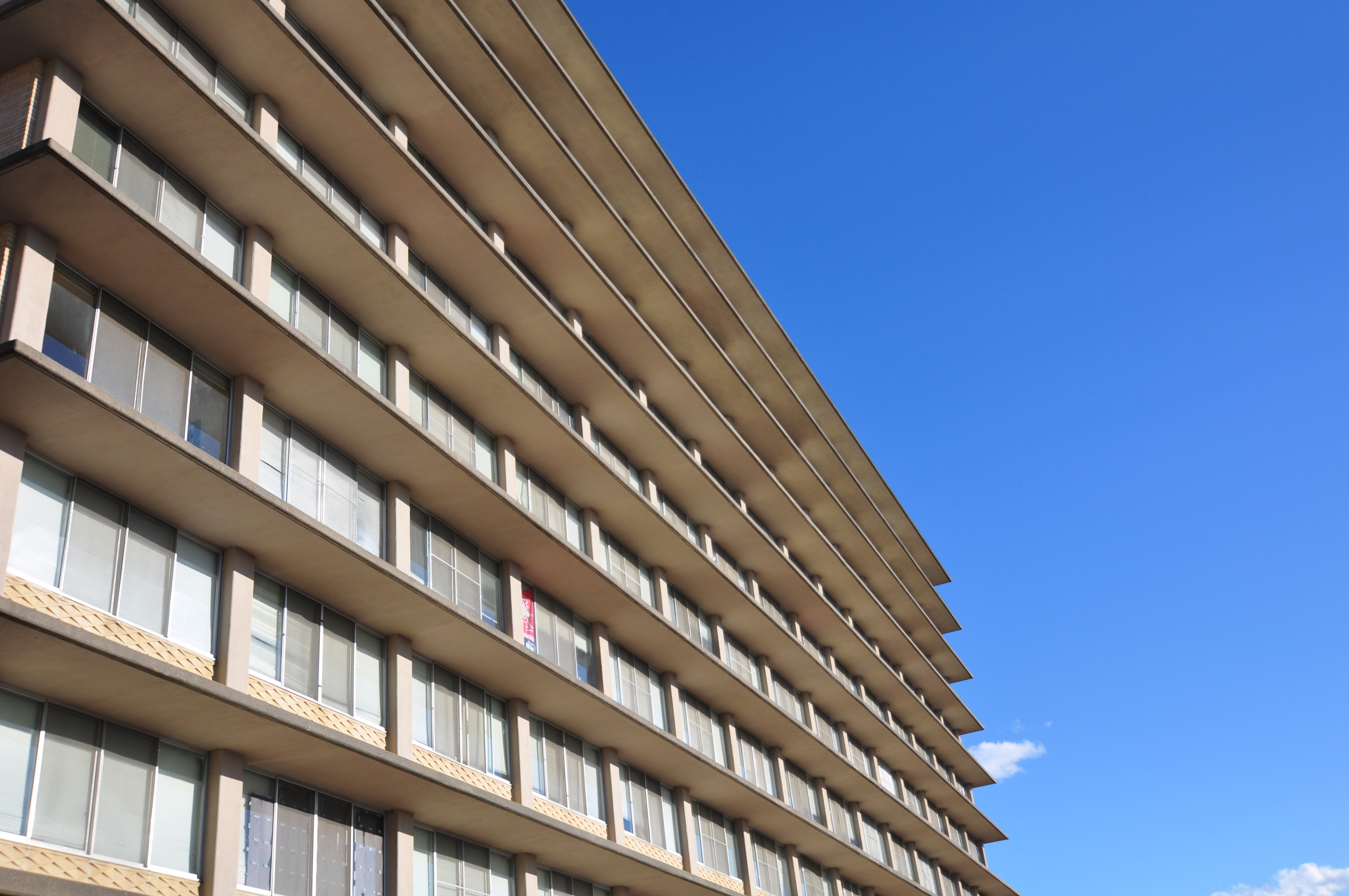
Yocum Hall of the University of Arkansas, designed by Mott, Mobley, Horstman & Staton and completed in 1963.

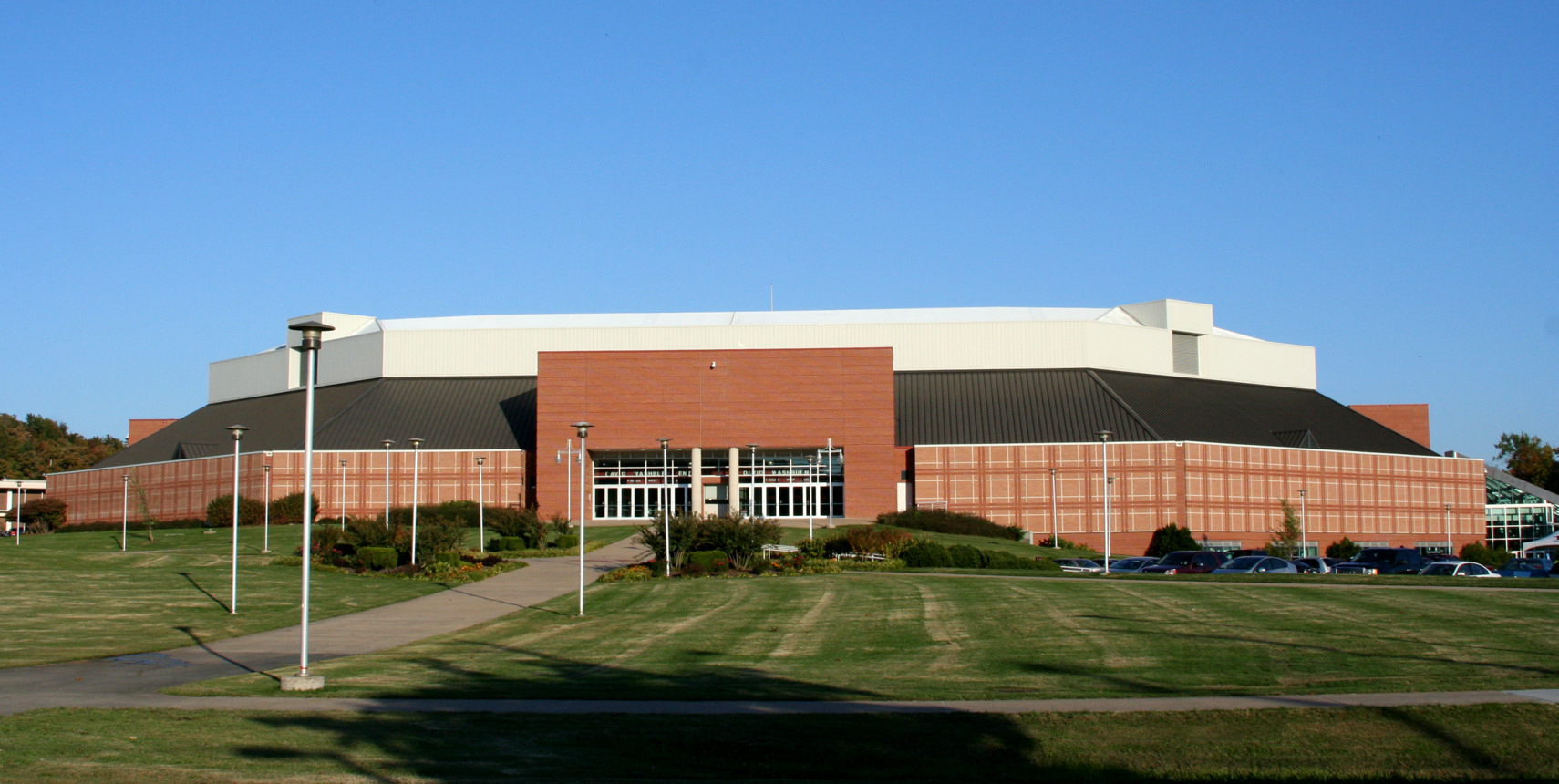
The Bud Walton Arena of the University of Arkansas, designed by associated architects Rosser FABRAP International and Mott, Mobley, McGowan & Griffin and completed in 1993.

Ralph O. Mott FAIA (May 30, 1903 – December 29, 1997) was an American architect in practice in Fort Smith, Arkansas from 1935 until his retirement in 1993. For nearly sixty years, he was head of the Fort Smith architecture firm now (2024) known as MAHG Architecture and was president of the National Council of Architectural Registration Boards for the year 1965.

== Life and career ==
Ralph Oliver Mott was born May 30, 1903 in rural Mahaska County, Iowa to Frank O. Mott and Pearl Mott, née Green. Mott was educated at Washington University in St. Louis, earning his BArch in 1925. After graduation, he joined the office of William B. Ittner. In 1926, he moved to Fort Smith to join Haralson & Nelson before moving on to Houston the next year to join Harry D. Payne, a former Ittner associate. In 1931, he returned to Haralson & Nelson in Fort Smith. In 1935, Joe J. Haralson and E. Chester Nelson dissolved their partnership, and Haralson and Mott formed the new partnership of Haralson & Mott. In 1948, a second partnership was established in Muskogee, Oklahoma under the name of Haralson & Horstman, operated by the Fort Smith partners with the addition of local partner William L. Horstman.

When Haralson died in 1955, Mott assumed control of both partnerships. In 1956, the Muskogee partnership was reorganized as Horstman & Mott, and in 1957, the Fort Smith partnership became Mott, Mobley & Horstman. Both partnerships changed with the addition and withdrawal of partners. With these changes, the Fort Smith partnership was renamed Mott, Mobley, Horstman & Staton in 1961; Mott, Mobley, Horstman & Griffin in 1969; Mott, Mobley, Richter, McGowan & Griffin in 1977; and Mott, Mobley, McGowan & Griffin in 1979. The Muskogee partnership was renamed Horstman, Richter & Mott in 1964 and was dissolved in 1978. In addition to Haralson, Horstman and Mott, long-time partners of these firms included architects Robert E. Mobley AIA, Harold L. Griffin AIA and Mott's son, John K. Mott FAIA. Despite his advanced age, Mott continued to be senior partner of the firm until his retirement in 1993. After his retirement the firm was reorganized as McGowan, Anderson, Hunter & Griffin and is now (2024) known as MAHG Architecture.

In 1945, Mott was appointed to the Arkansas State Board of Architects, which supervised the licensing of architects in Arkansas. He served on the board until 1975 and was its president from 1954 to 1958. In the latter, year he was elected to the board of the National Council of Architectural Registration Boards, an organization constituted from state licensing boards. He was elected president for 1965 and served on the board until 1966. As president, Mott focused on standardizing licensure requirements across states.

Mott joined the American Institute of Architects in 1937 as a member of the Arkansas chapter. He served as chapter president for the year 1956. Mott was elected a Fellow of the AIA in 1966, the second Arkansas architect to be so honored and the first from outside Little Rock. In 1983, he was awarded the inaugural Fay Jones Gold Medal Award by AIA Arkansas.

== Personal life ==
Mott was married in 1927 to Dollie Rea Boler. They had two children, John Kneeland Mott and Gordon Boler Mott. Mott died December 29, 1997 in retirement in Cumberland, Maryland at the age of 94.

Mott's son, John K. Mott, became a partner in his firm in 1969. He was well known as a preservation architect. His works for the firm included the restoration of Old Main (1991) of the University of Arkansas. After leaving the firm, he was a partner of George M. Notter in Washington, D.C. from 1992 to 1996, before joining other firms.

== Legacy ==
Two works designed by Mott and his partners have been listed on the United States National Register of Historic Places.

== Architectural works ==
=== Haralson & Mott, 1935–1957 ===
- 1939 – Memorial Hall, (Note: Designed by Haralson & Mott and Mann & Wanger, associated architects.) University of Arkansas, Fayetteville, Arkansas
- 1939 – Polk County Courthouse, (Note: NRHP-listed.) 507 Church Ave, Mena, Arkansas
- 1941 – Nyberg Building, (Note: Designed by Haralson & Mott and Erhart & Eichenbaum, associated architects.) Arkansas Tuberculosis Sanatorium, Booneville, Arkansas
- 1951 – Fine Arts Center, (Note: Designed by Edward Durell Stone, architect, with Haralson & Mott, associate architects.) University of Arkansas, Fayetteville, Arkansas
- 1954 – Barnhill Arena, University of Arkansas, Fayetteville, Arkansas
- 1954 – Central Presbyterian Church, 2901 Rogers Ave, Fort Smith, Arkansas

=== Mott, Mobley & Horstman, 1957–1961 ===
- 1959 – W. O. Young Building, (Note: Demolished.) Arkansas Tech University, Russellville, Arkansas
- 1961 – Humphreys Hall, University of Arkansas, Fayetteville, Arkansas

=== Mott, Mobley, Horstman & Staton, 1961–1969 ===
- 1963 – Southside High School, 4100 Gary St, Fort Smith, Arkansas
- 1963 – Superior Federal Savings and Loan Bank Building, (Note: Repurposed in 2013 as the Fort Smith Regional Art Museum by Polk Stanley Wilcox Architects.) 1601 Rogers Ave, Fort Smith, Arkansas
- 1963 – Yocum Hall, University of Arkansas, Fayetteville, Arkansas
- 1966 – First Christian Church, 3600 Free Ferry Rd, Fort Smith, Arkansas
- 1967 – Paine Hall, Arkansas Tech University, Russellville, Arkansas
- 1968 – Discovery Hall, University of Arkansas, Fayetteville, Arkansas
- 1968 – Muskogee Civic Center, 425 Boston St, Muskogee, Oklahoma
- 1968 – Vines Building, University of Arkansas–Fort Smith, Fort Smith, Arkansas

=== Mott, Mobley, Horstman & Griffin, 1969–1977 ===
- 1970 – Fort Smith Public Library (former), 61 S 8th St, Fort Smith, Arkansas
- 1976 – Tucker Coliseum, Arkansas Tech University, Russellville, Arkansas

=== Mott, Mobley, Richter, McGowan & Griffin, 1977–1979 ===
- 1978 – Barnhill Arena expansion, University of Arkansas, Fayetteville, Arkansas
- 1984 – John L. McClellan Memorial Veterans Hospital, (Note: Designed by a joint venture led by Gyo Obata of Hellmuth, Obata & Kassabaum and including Cromwell, Neyland, Truemper, Levy & Gatchell and Wellborn Hardwick Henderson of Little Rock, Mott, Mobley, Richter, McGowan & Griffin and Stuck Frier Lane Scott Beisner of Jonesboro.) 4300 W 7th St, Little Rock, Arkansas

=== Mott, Mobley, McGowan & Griffin, 1979–1993 ===
- 1984 – HPER Complex, University of Arkansas, Fayetteville, Arkansas
- 1991 – Old Main rehabilitation, University of Arkansas, Fayetteville, Arkansas
- 1993 – Bud Walton Arena, (Note: Designed by Rosser FABRAP International of Atlanta and Mott, Mobley, McGowan & Griffin.) University of Arkansas, Fayetteville, Arkansas
