= HPER Complex =

Facility at the University of Central Arkansas

Coordinates: 36°03′53″N 94°10′41″W

The HPER Complex (short for Health, Physical Education, and Recreation) is a multipurpose facility on the campus of the University of Arkansas. Built in 1984, it is designed to house the entire Health Science, Kinesiology, Recreation, and Dance programs. The department of University Recreation is housed in the HPER and helps to run the daily operation of the facility. It has four levels (floors), as listed below. The facility is currently under the direction of Becky Todd, Executive Director of University Recreation.

The building was designed by Mott, Mobley, McGowan & Griffin of Fort Smith.

== Level 1 ==
Level 1 is home to ten racquetball courts (eight of which have glass back walls, and two of which have solid black walls), as well as an observation lounge. Two of the courts are even marked for wallyball and squash. It also is home to the Outdoor Connection Center, where various outdoor equipment can be rented at a nominal fee.

== Level 2 ==
Level 2 is home to 50-meter, 533,000 gallon natatorium (unique in its shallowest end being in the middle), a multiple-activity gymnasium with a seating capacity of 400 and a regulation-sized college basketball court (which is part-time home to the Arkansas Fantastics of the American Basketball Association), the Donna Auxum Fitness & Weight Training Center, and two dance studios (a practice one, and a performance one with a seating capacity of 200).

== Level 3 ==
Level 3 is home to three gymnasiums, a human performance laboratory, five classrooms, and the faculty offices.

== Level 4 ==
The top level holds a jogging track, with the outside lane 1/8 mi (0.20 km) in length.
