= Darragh Building =

- U.S. National Register of Historic Places
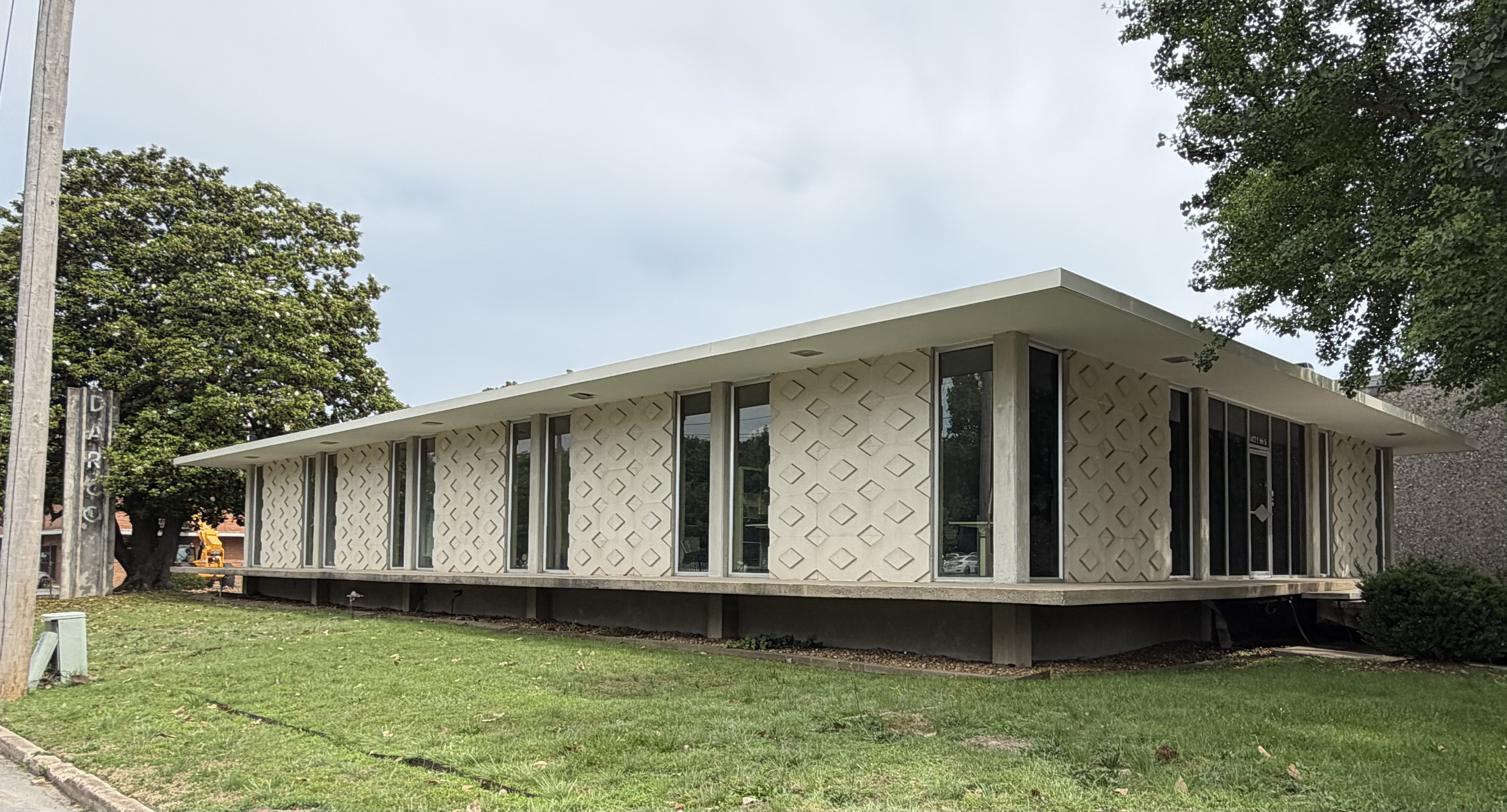
- The Darragh Building in 2026

- Location within Arkansas Location within the United States
- Location: 1403 E. 6th Ave., Little Rock, Arkansas
- Coordinates: 34°44′30″N 92°15′18″W
- Area: less than one acre
- Built: 1958
- Architect: Erhart, Eichenbaum, Rauch & Blass
- NRHP reference No.: 100000557
- Added to NRHP: September 7, 2017

The Darragh Building, also known as the DARCO Building, is a historic commercial building at 1403 East 6th Street in Little Rock, Arkansas. It is a single-story building with an office component and a warehouse component. The office component is built using modern post and beam construction, and has walls composed of concrete panel and floor-to-ceiling windows. Both it and its stairs are set on recessed platforms, giving it the appearance that it is floating. It was built in 1958 to a design by Noland Blass Jr. of Erhart, Eichenbaum, Rauch & Blass, and is a good example of Mid-Century Modern commercial architecture.

The building was listed on the National Register of Historic Places in 2017.

== See also ==
- National Register of Historic Places listings in Little Rock, Arkansas
