= Downtowner Motor Inn =

- U.S. National Register of Historic Places
- NM State Register of Cultural Properties
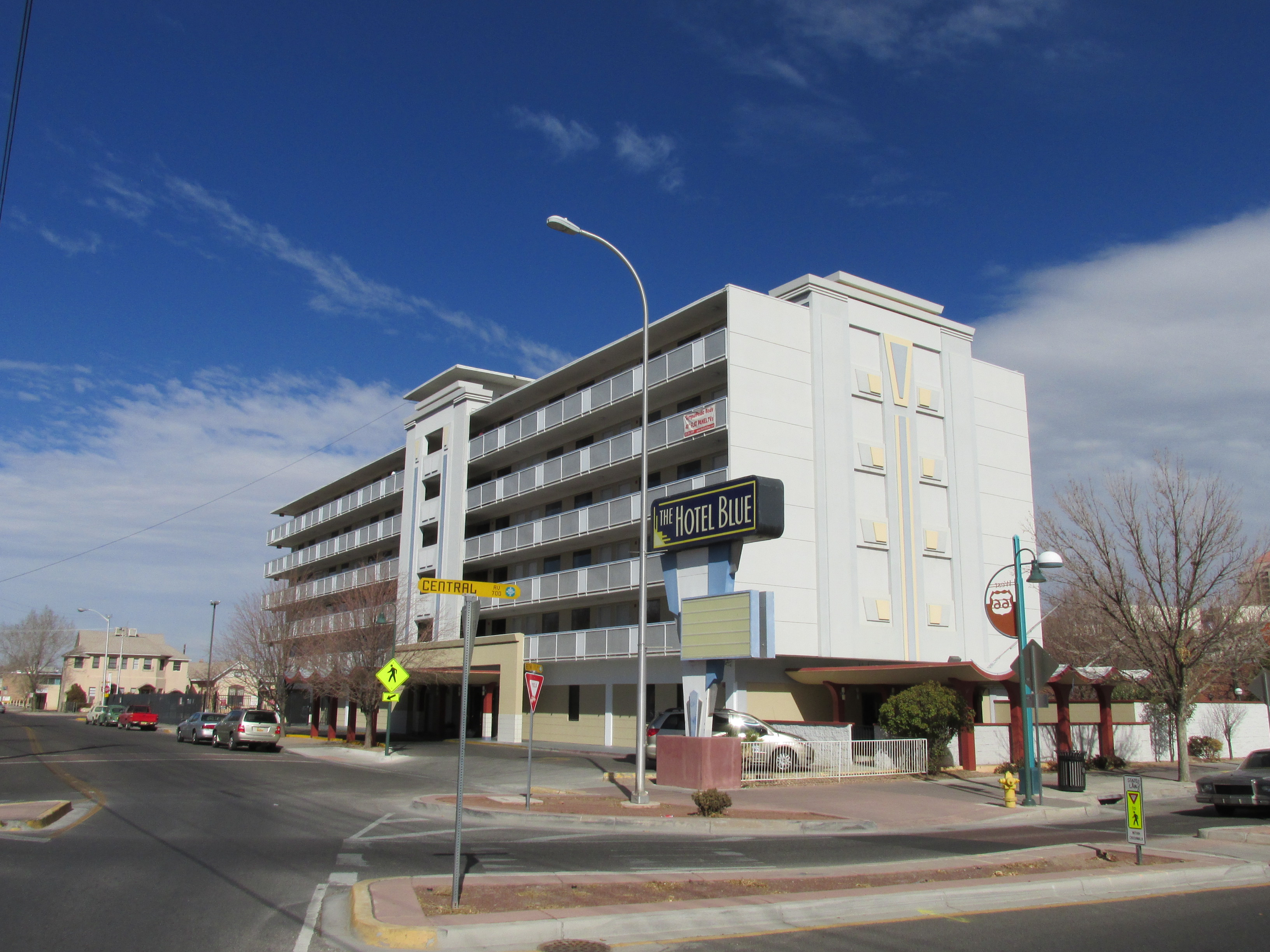
- The motel in 2013

- Location within New Mexico Location within the United States
- Location: 717 Central Ave. NW, Albuquerque, New Mexico
- Coordinates: 35.0852°N 106.6561°W
- Built: 1965
- Architect: James L. Burke
- Architectural style: International
- NRHP reference No.: 100005731
- NMSRCP No.: 2061

Significant dates
- Added to NRHP: November 4, 2020
- Designated NMSRCP: August 14, 2020

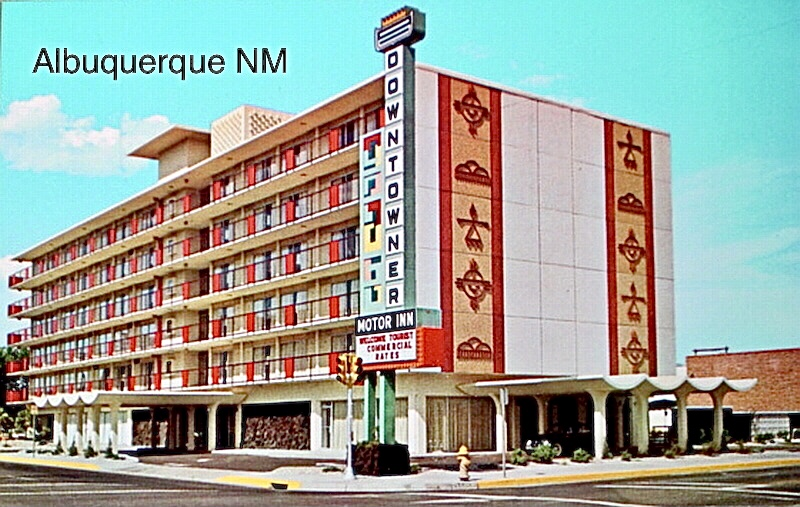
1965 Promotional Postcard

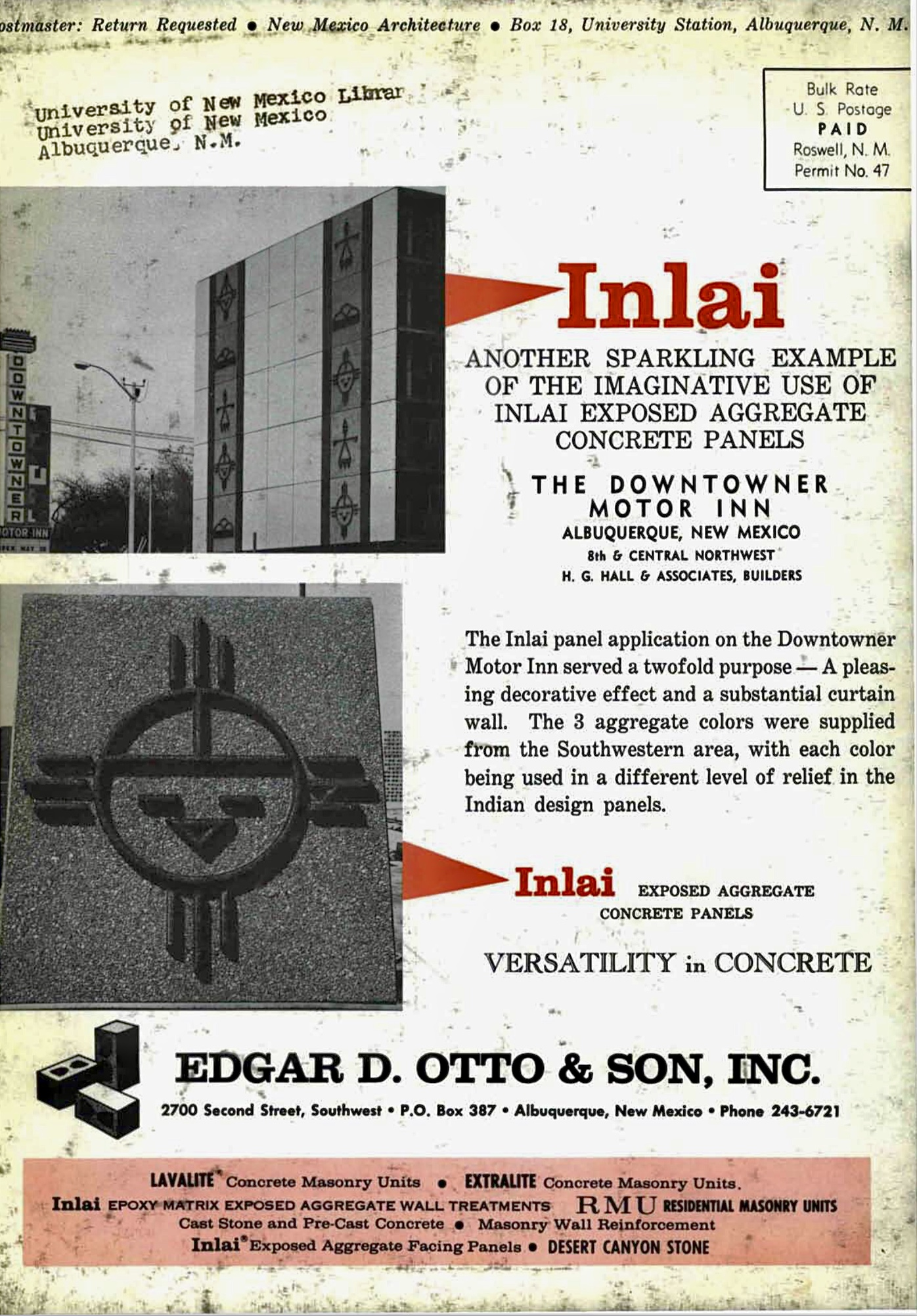
Advertisement of “Inlai” Concrete Product Used to Create Facade Art

The Downtowner Motor Inn is a historic motel on Central Avenue (former U.S. Route 66) in Downtown Albuquerque, New Mexico. It opened in 1965 as part of the Memphis-based Downtowner Motor Inn chain and has gone through several changes in branding, most recently reopening as Arrive Albuquerque in 2025.

The building was listed on the New Mexico State Register of Cultural Properties and the National Register of Historic Places in 2020 as "an exceptional example of a mid-20th-century motel on Route 66 in Albuquerque."

== History ==
The motel opened in 1965 as the 46th property of the Memphis, Tennessee-based, Downtowner Motor Inn chain, which operated economy-priced motels in city centers across the U.S. In 1972, the property was sold and became a Quality Inn. It has also operated as a Ramada and more recently as the Hotel Blue, which closed in 2017. In 2020, it was announced that the motel would be renovated by the Los Angeles–based Arrive Hotels & Restaurants to reopen in 2022. These plans were delayed by the COVID-19 pandemic, and Arrive Hotels was purchased by a different hotel company, Palisociety, in 2021. After several years of delays, the project was reported in 2023 to be "back on track" with a targeted completion date of December 2024. The motel reopened in February, 2025, as Arrive Albuquerque with Abraham Juarez as general manager.

== Architecture ==
The motel was designed by James L. Burke of the Memphis, Tennessee–based firm of Burke & Beaty Architects. It is a six-story building of reinforced concrete construction and is an example of International Style architecture with an emphasis on simple rectangular forms. It has 145 rooms, which are accessed in typical motel fashion via open-air exterior walkways with metal railings rather than a central lobby. Elevators are located in a breezeway near the center of each floor. The ground floor has scalloped concrete portes-cochères on the south and west elevations, facing Central Avenue and 8th Street, respectively. The south elevation included stylized Southwestern symbols cast into the exterior concrete panels, which was unusual for International Style architecture. These elements were obscured and damaged by new exterior trim which was glued onto the panels during a 2007–08 remodeling. Arrive Hotels reportedly planned to restore the exterior of the building closer to its original appearance.

== See also ==
- Hill Wheatley Downtowner Motor Inn, another NRHP-listed Downtowner Motor Inn in Hot Springs, Arkansas
