= Hill Wheatley Downtowner Motor Inn =

- U.S. National Register of Historic Places
- U.S. Historic district – Contributing property
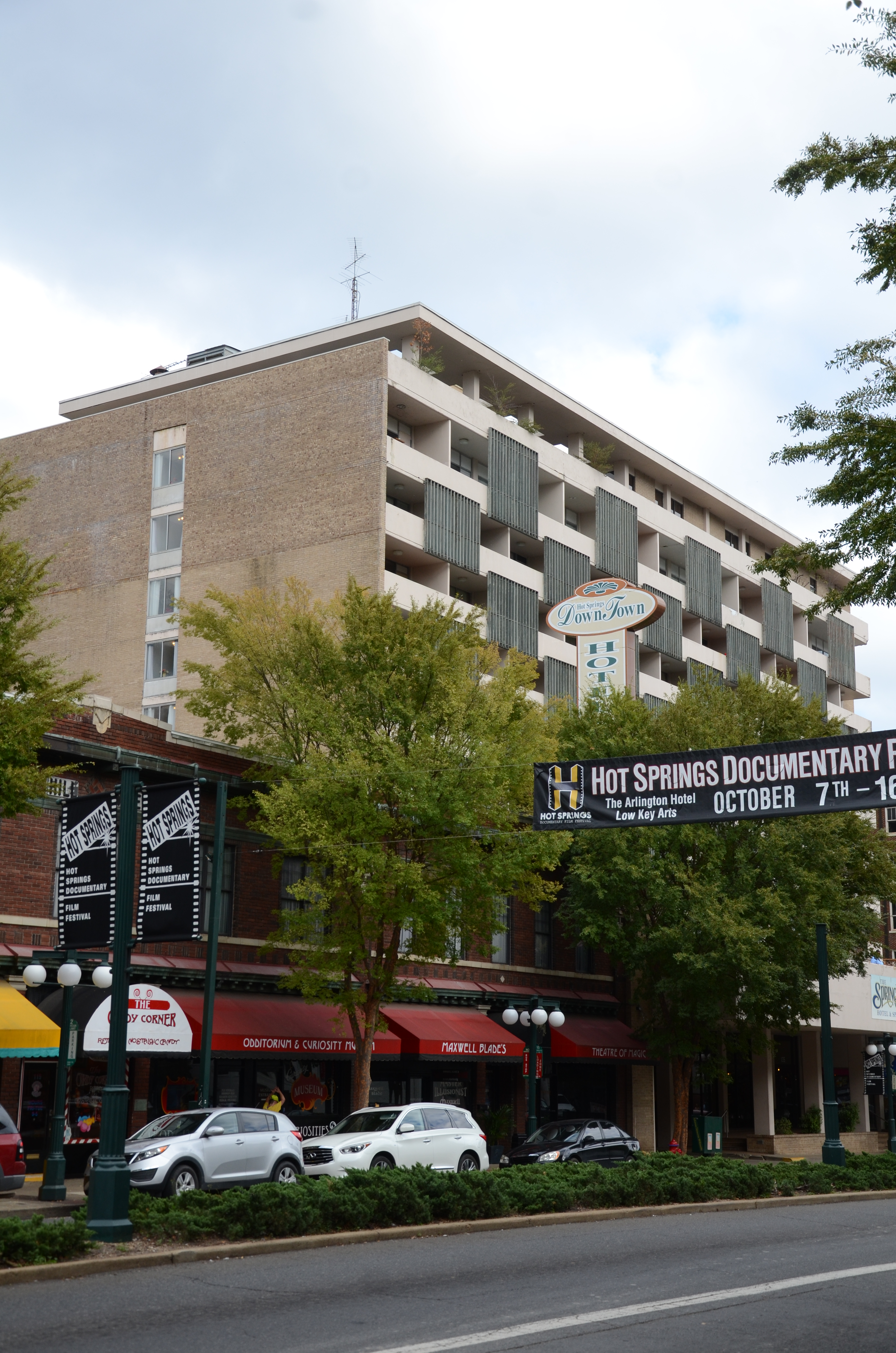

- Location within Arkansas Location within the United States
- Location: 135 Central Ave., Hot Springs, Arkansas
- Coordinates: 34°31′4″N 93°3′18″W
- Area: 2.5 acres (1.0 ha)
- Architect: Erhart, Eichenbaum, Rauch & Blass
- Architectural style: Mid-Century Modern
- Part of: Hot Springs Central Avenue Historic District (ID85001370)
- NRHP reference No.: 16000650

Significant dates
- Added to NRHP: September 27, 2016
- Designated CP: June 25, 1985

The Hill Wheatley Downtowner Motor Inn is a historic hotel at 135 Central Avenue in Hot Springs, Arkansas, United States. It is a ten-story rectangular structure, finished in glass, brick, and metal, in the Mid-Century Modern style. Its main block is set back from the street, behind a two-story entry retail section. The tower is fronted mainly by balconies with panels of redwood screening to provide visual relief and shade. The hotel was designed in 1965 by Noland Blass Jr. of Erhart, Eichenbaum, Rauch & Blass for Hill Wheatley, one of Hot Springs' major promoters. It is one of the only surviving hotels in the city with its own bathhouse.

The property was listed on the National Register of Historic Places in 2016.

== See also ==
- National Register of Historic Places listings in Garland County, Arkansas
- Downtowner Motor Inn, another NRHP-listed hotel from the same chain in Albuquerque, New Mexico
