= Polk County Courthouse (Arkansas) =

- U.S. National Register of Historic Places
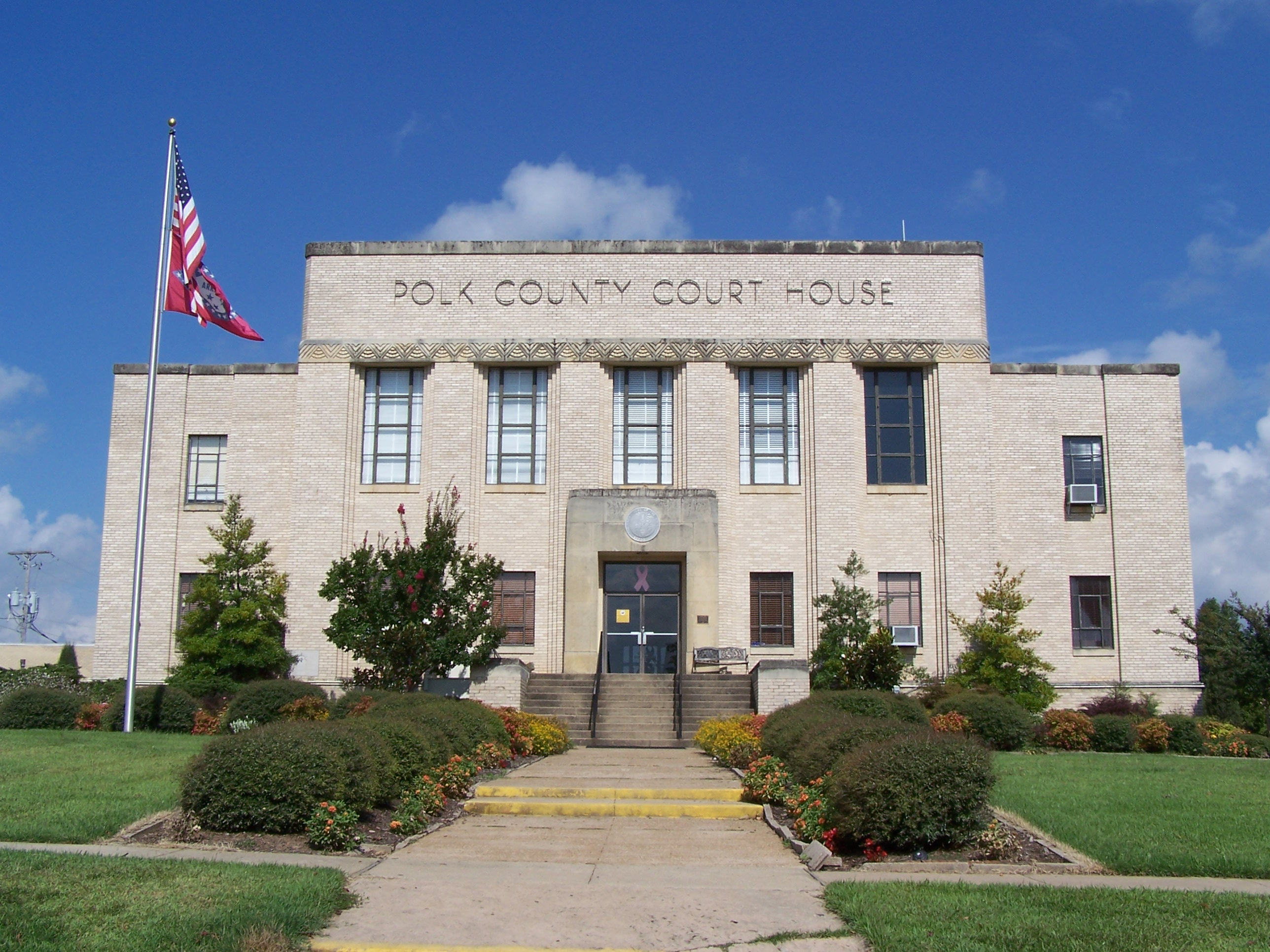

- Location within Arkansas Location within the United States
- Location: Jct. of Church Ave. and DeQueen St., NE corner, Mena, Arkansas
- Coordinates: 34°35′12″N 94°14′21″W
- Area: less than one acre
- Built by: Public Works Administration
- Architect: Haralson & Mott
- Architectural style: Art Deco
- NRHP reference No.: 92001618
- Added to NRHP: November 20, 1992

The Polk County Courthouse is a historic government building at Church Avenue and DeQueen Streets in Mena, Arkansas, the county seat of Polk County. The original portion of the building is a two-story light-colored brick structure, with restrained Art Deco styling. It was designed by Haralson & Mott of Fort Smith, and was built in 1939 with funding from the Public Works Administration. To the rear of the courthouse is a modern wing, joined by a breezeway. The original building is little-altered—only its front doors have been replaced with modern glass and aluminum doors.

The building was listed on the National Register of Historic Places in 1992.

== See also ==
- National Register of Historic Places listings in Polk County, Arkansas
