= Noland Blass Jr. House =

Historic house in Arkansas, United States

- U.S. National Register of Historic Places
- Location within Arkansas Location within the United States
- Location: 217 Normandy Rd., Little Rock, Arkansas
- Coordinates: 34°46′3″N 92°20′40″W
- Area: less than one acre
- Built: 1952
- Architect: Noland Blass Jr.
- Architectural style: Mid-Century Modern
- NRHP reference No.: 100003333
- Added to NRHP: January 24, 2019

The Noland Blass Jr. House is a historic house at 217 Normandy Rd. in Little Rock, Arkansas. It is a single-story Mid-Century Modern structure, finished in brick and vertical board siding. It is covered by a shallow-pitch gabled roof, whose eaves extend well beyond the structure. Its main entrance is recessed, and its rear wall is mostly glass, providing views of the landscaped yard with pergola and swimming pool. The house was built in 1952 to a design by the noted Arkansas architect Noland Blass Jr. for his family. It was sold out of the family about 1990.

The house was listed on the National Register of Historic Places in 2019 for its architecture.
