= Jesse D. Riley =

American physician

Jesse Dean Riley
- Born: November 10, 1890; Berea, Ashley County, Arkansas
- Died: January 14, 1964 (aged 73); Booneville, Logan County, Arkansas
- Education: Tulane University
- Years active: 1919–1955
- Known for: Superintendent, Arkansas Tuberculosis Sanatorium

Jesse Dean Riley FACP FCCP (10 November 1890 – 14 January 1964) was an American medical doctor. He was the Superintendent of the Arkansas Tuberculosis Sanatorium in Booneville, Arkansas. He led the state's strategy for tuberculosis for twenty-five years, including during World War II.

== Biography ==
=== Early life and education ===
Riley was born to John Riley and Martha Sullivan in Berea, Ashley County, on 10 November 1890. He graduated with honors from Tulane University School of Medicine in 1916. On the eve of his graduation, he was diagnosed with tuberculosis. He requested admission to the Arkansas Tuberculosis Sanatorium in Booneville but the facility of 60 beds was fully occupied with a waiting list of 600 persons. Riley retreated to a cottage in Ashley County. A year later, he had recovered.

=== Professional career ===
Riley started practicing medicine in Montrose in 1919. After two years of private practice, he was appointed superintendent of the Southern Baptist Sanatorium in El Paso. In 1930, he became superintendent and medical director of the Arkansas Tuberculosis Sanatorium in Booneville. He served in that capacity until 1955.

In 1929, the year before Riley was appointed, the Arkansas Tuberculosis Sanatorium benefitted from a large expansion program. The facility was expanded to 320 beds. Riley estimated the number of tuberculosis patients in Arkansas in 1931 to be around 25,000.

On his watch, the Sanatorium expanded significantly and became the largest and best equipped tuberculosis facility in the country. Between 1938 and 1940, the Sanatorium attended to over 1200 patients at the facility and another 2100 in a Live at Home program set up by Riley. By the early 1940s, Riley's standing was such that his biennial appropriation requests were approved by the Senate without discussion. In 1943, Riley was appointed chairman of the Arkansas Tuberculosis Control Commission, to plan a unified wartime effort to control tuberculosis in the state.

Riley was president of the Southern Sanatorium Association in 1944. He was Professor in charge of Tuberculosis Instruction at the University of Arkansas School of Medicine from 1947 until his retirement.

When streptomycin was introduced after 1944, Riley was initially skeptical. In 1946, he wrote in Sanatorium Outlook that the results of the antibiotic were still unproven and that it had significant negative side effects. Riley maintained his skepticism well into the 1950s.

Due to health issues, Riley retired from active service in 1955. He was appointed Superintendent Emeritus and lived at the Sanatorium until his death in 1964.

=== Personal life ===
Riley was married three times. In 1915, he married Claudia Grace Carpenter (1894–1924). The couple had three daughters, Helen (b. 1917), Hazel (b. 1920) and Martha (b. 1921). After Carpenter died, Riley married Francis Kuhls (1892–1933). After Kuhls died, Riley married a nurse at the sanatorium, Ella Louise Stevenson (1908–1984), with whom he adopted a daughter Rebecca Louise.

== Awards ==
- Honorary Arkansan of the Year 1951
- Congressional Award for special service during World War II

== Publications ==
- Riley J.D. The psychological moment in the treatment of tuberculosis. American Review of Tuberculosis 1946;54(4–5):340–343. doi:10.1164/art.1946.54.4-5.340
- Riley, J.D. The Relative Importance of the Anatomic and Physiologic Concept in Tuberculosis, Diseases of the Chest 1944 Vol 10 Issue 4, 317–325
- Riley, J.D. The tuberculosis problem in Arkansas. Journal of the Arkansas Medical Society. 1953 Oct; 50(5):78–80. PMID: 13096466
