= Barnhill Arena =

Arena in Fayetteville, Arkansas

John Barnhill Arena
- Interactive map of John Barnhill Arena
- Former names: Arkansas Fieldhouse (1954–1973)
- Location: 285 N Stadium Dr; Fayetteville, AR 72701
- Coordinates: 36°04′00″N 94°10′41″W
- Owner: University of Arkansas
- Operator: University of Arkansas
- Capacity: 8,500 (1994–present); 9,000 (1978–1994); 5,000 (1954–1978)
- Record attendance: 4,299 (women's volleyball; August 20, 2023)

Construction
- Groundbreaking: 1953
- Opened: 1954
- Architect: Haralson & Mott

Tenants
- Arkansas Razorbacks (NCAA); Men's basketball (1954–1993); Women's basketball (1976–1993); Women's gymnastics (2003–2024); Women's volleyball (1994–present)

Barnhill Arena is a 10,000-seat multipurpose arena in Fayetteville, Arkansas, now used primarily for volleyball. The arena opened in 1954 and was home to the University of Arkansas Razorbacks (men's) and (women's) basketball teams before they moved to Bud Walton Arena in 1993. Prior to that, the arena had been considered to be one of the toughest to play in, first in the Southwest Conference and then in the Southeastern Conference, especially when Nolan Richardson and Eddie Sutton were coaches; it earned the nickname "Barnhell Arena" because of its rabid student section. After the opening of the new arena, the university converted Barnhill Arena into a volleyball and gymnastics-specific facility, and the Ladybacks' volleyball and gymnastics teams have played there ever since. The arena is also occasionally used for special events, such as concerts, graduations, and speakers.

It was originally built as the Arkansas Fieldhouse and renamed in 1973 in honor of John Barnhill, the school's former head football coach and athletic director.

The arena is just southeast of Donald W. Reynolds Razorback Stadium. Barnhill housed the locker room for Arkansas' football team until a new complex was built in the north end zone.

The architects of the building were Haralson & Mott of Fort Smith.
