= Arkansas Tuberculosis Sanatorium Historic District =

Historic district in Arkansas, United States

- U.S. National Register of Historic Places
- U.S. Historic district
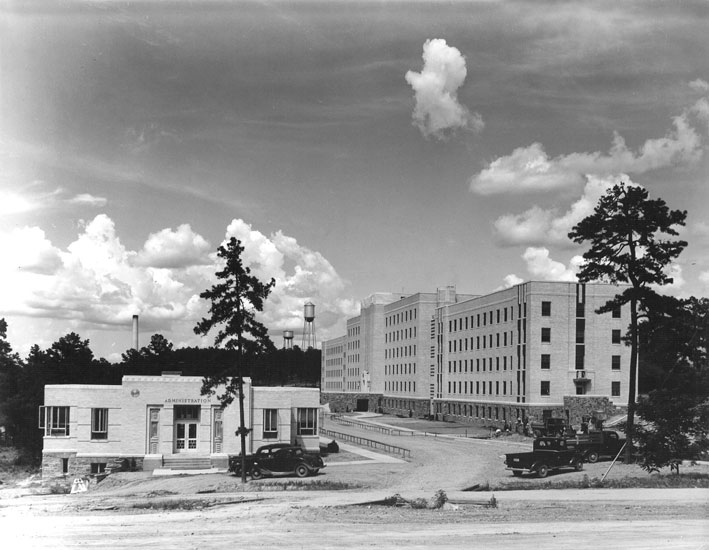
- Administration building (left) and the Nyberg Building, the main hospital (right)

- Location within Arkansas Location within the United States
- Nearest city: Booneville, Arkansas
- Coordinates: 35°5′48″N 93°54′54″W
- Area: 896.2 acres (362.7 ha)
- Built: 1909
- Architect: Haralson & Mott, Erhart & Eichenbaum
- Architectural style: Art Deco, Colonial Revival
- NRHP reference No.: 06000414
- Added to NRHP: October 5, 2006

The Arkansas Tuberculosis Sanatorium Historic District is a United States Historic District south of Booneville, Arkansas that was listed on the National Register of Historic Places in October 2006. The district encompasses the former relocation center for Arkansans diagnosed with tuberculosis and an administration building built in the Art Deco style in 1909. It is one of the largest and best-preserved surviving complexes of its type in the country.

== History ==
The sanatorium was the relocation center for all white Arkansans with tuberculosis. By the time the facility was closed in 1973, it had treated over 70,000 patients. The main hospital, named the Nyberg Building after Leo E. Nyberg, a former sanatorium patient and state legislator who sponsored the bill funding the construction, was completed in 1941. The facility became known worldwide as one of the most successful and modern hospitals for the treatment of tuberculosis of its day.

The sanatorium complex was self-sustaining, with dormitories, staff entertainment buildings, a chapel, laundry, dairy, water treatment plant, independent telephone system, and even a fire department. At the height of its use, the complex employed nearly 300 staff members. At one point, the total population of the center was greater than that of Booneville, in the valley below.

With the introduction of more effective drug therapy, the patient population began to decline. Eventually the sanatorium was closed in 1973. The campus was then used as the Booneville Human Development Center, a state-run residential program for adults with mild and moderate mental retardation and other developmental disabilities which is what it remains today.

The main buildings were designed by the architectural firms of Haralson & Mott of Fort Smith, Arkansas and Erhart & Eichenbaum of Little Rock, Arkansas.

== See also ==
- National Register of Historic Places listings in Logan County, Arkansas
- Jesse D. Riley
