= Howard County Courthouse (Arkansas) =

- U.S. National Register of Historic Places
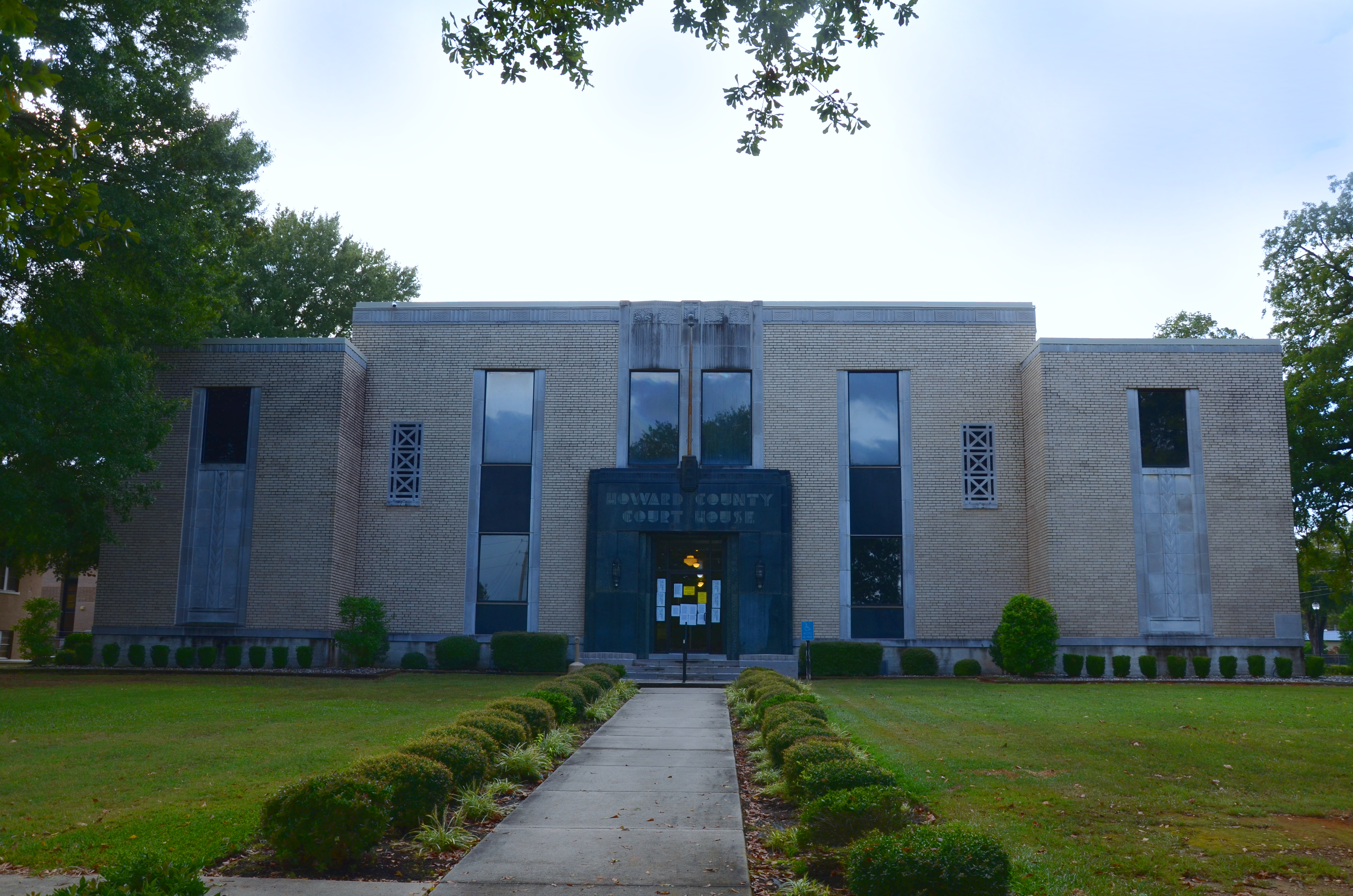

- Location within Arkansas Location within the United States
- Location: Jct. of N. Main St. and Bishop St., Nashville, Arkansas
- Coordinates: 33°56′52″N 93°50′51″W
- Built by: Public Works Administration
- Architect: Erhart & Eichenbaum
- Architectural style: Moderne
- NRHP reference No.: 90000902
- Added to NRHP: June 14, 1990

The Howard County Courthouse is located at North Main and Bishop Streets in Nashville, Arkansas, the seat of Howard County. It is a two-story brick building in the shape of an H, built in 1939 with funding from the Public Works Administration. It is Moderne in style, designed by the Little Rock firm Erhart & Eichenbaum. The front facade, facing east, has a central entrance framed in black marble, an element repeated on the secondary entrances on the north and south facades. The interior hallways are covered in expanses of tile in earth tones, and the Art Deco woodwork in the courtrooms is original to the period.

The building was listed on the National Register of Historic Places in 1990.

== See also ==
- National Register of Historic Places listings in Howard County, Arkansas
