= Bud Walton Arena =

Indoor arena at the University of Arkansas

Nolan Richardson Court at Bud Walton Arena
- Basketball Palace of Mid-America
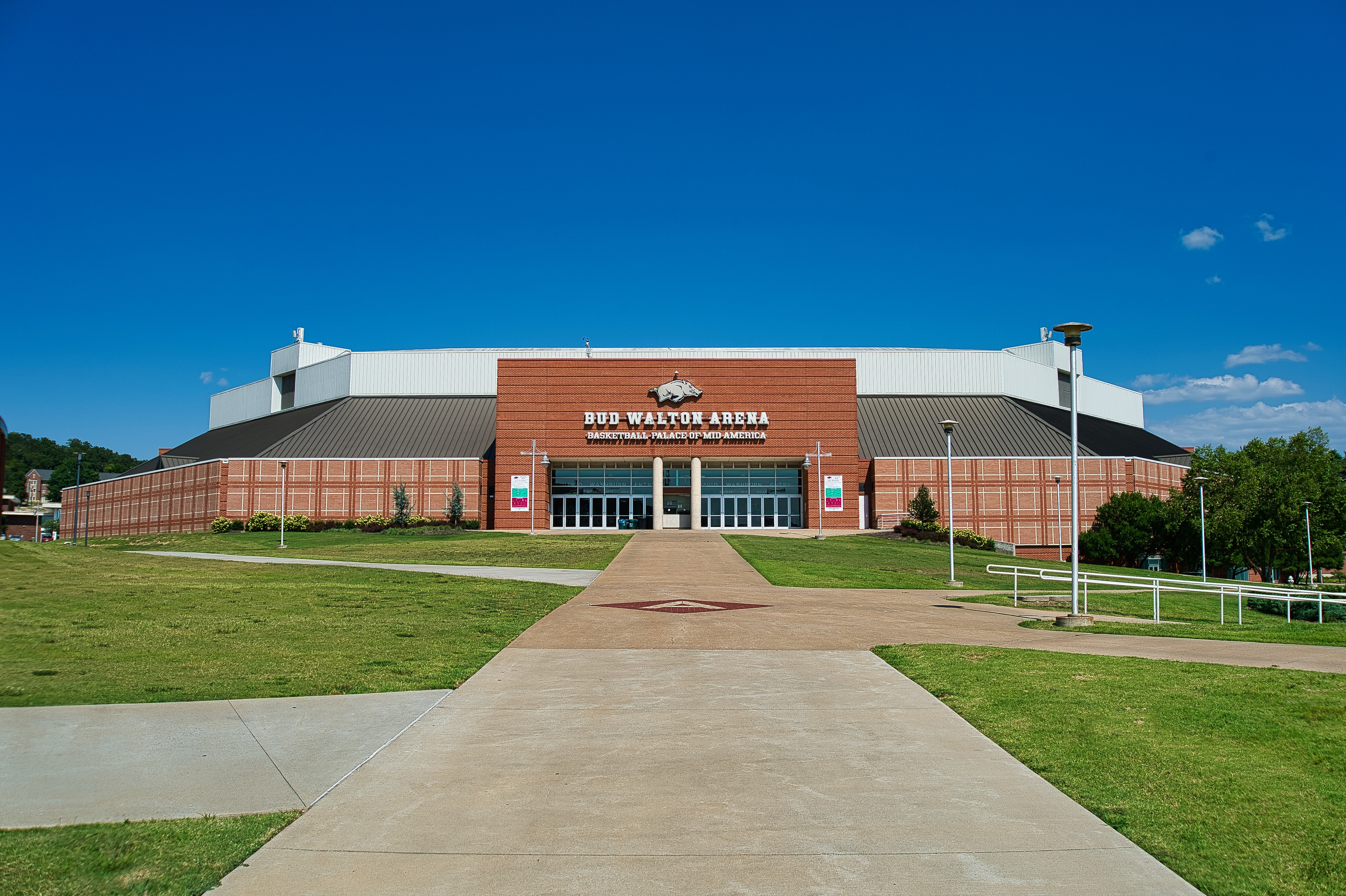
- Interactive map of Nolan Richardson Court at Bud Walton Arena
- Location: 1270 Nolan Richardson Drive; Fayetteville, Arkansas 72701-5570
- Coordinates: 36.061518°N 94.178188°W
- Owner: University of Arkansas
- Operator: University of Arkansas
- Capacity: 19,368 (2009–present); 19,200 (1993–2009)
- Surface: Hardwood Floor
- Record attendance: 20,344 (November 29, 2023 vs. Duke)

Construction
- Groundbreaking: March 28, 1992
- Opened: November 29, 1993
- Cost: $30 Million ($66.9 million in 2025 dollars)
- Architects: Rosser International; Mott, Mobley, McGowan & Griffin
- General contractor: Huber, Hunt & Nichiols

Tenants
- Arkansas Razorbacks men's and women's basketball teams (1993-present)

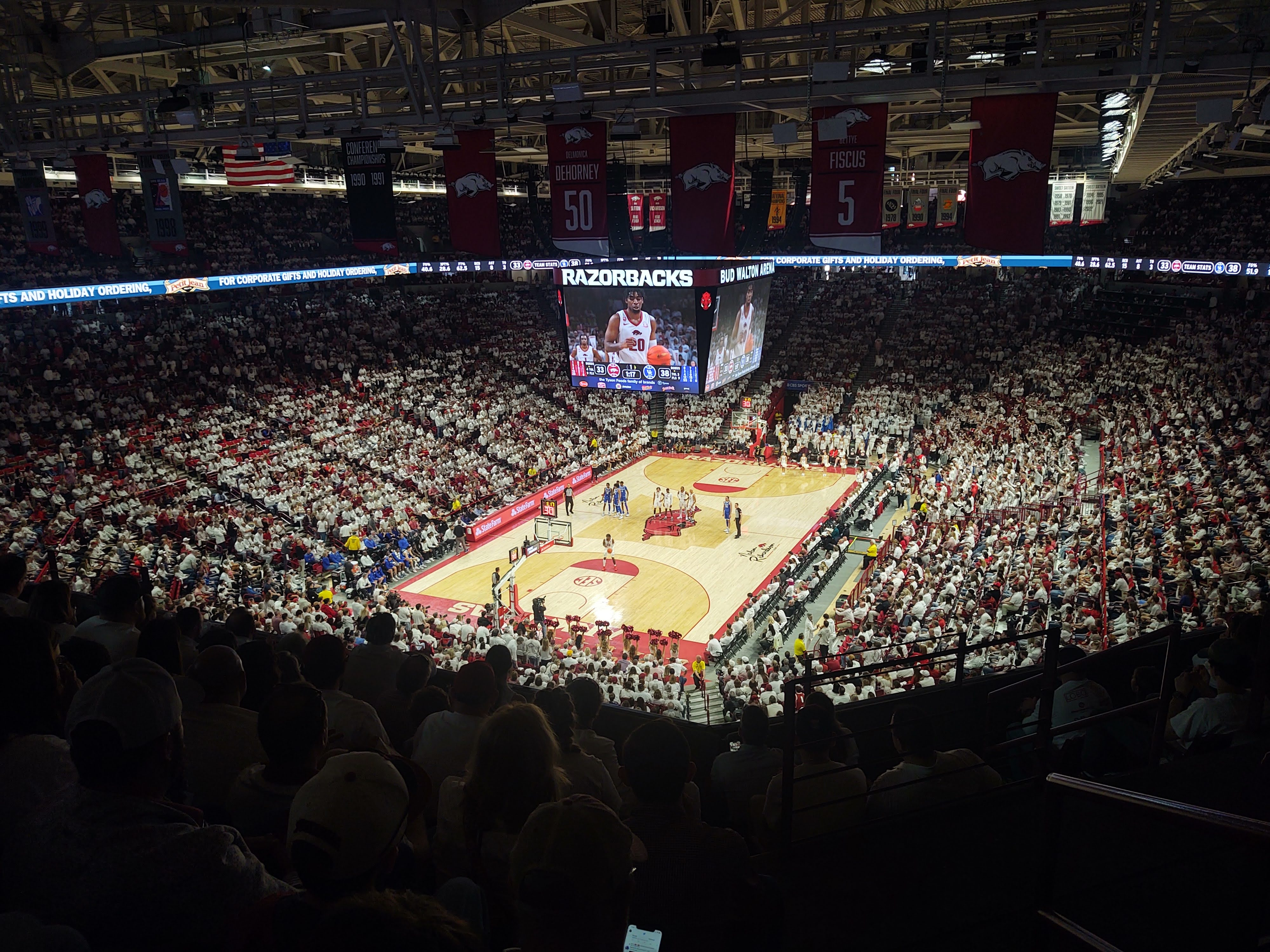
Interior of Bud Walton Arena during a men's basketball game vs Kentucky in 2023

Bud Walton Arena (also known locally as the Basketball Palace of Mid-America) is the home to the men's and women's basketball teams of the University of Arkansas, known as the Razorbacks. It is located on the campus of the University of Arkansas in Fayetteville, Arkansas, and has a seating capacity of 19,368, which is the fifth largest for an on-campus arena in the United States.

The arena features Bud Walton Arena Razorback Sports Museum on the ground level, which houses a history of Razorback basketball, track and field, baseball, tennis and golf.

== Construction ==
The arena is named after James "Bud" Walton, co-founder of Walmart, who donated a large portion of the funds needed to build the arena. Walton purportedly gave $15 million, or around half of the construction cost. Construction of the arena took only 18 months, a short time considering the size of the undertaking.

When it was built, it was touted as a larger version of Barnhill Arena, the team's former home. In hopes of recreating the formidable home-court advantage the Razorbacks enjoyed at Barnhill, architect Rosser International built an arena that, as the company put it, had "more seats in less space than in any other facility of the same type anywhere in the world."

== Early years ==
The arena has been the home to the Razorbacks since November 1993; the men's team won the national championship in the arena's first season of operation. The basketball team's former home, Barnhill Arena was renovated into a volleyball-specific facility and now houses the Razorback volleyball and gymnastics teams, along with hosting high school graduations.

In its early years, Nolan Richardson's teams frequently attracted standing-room-only crowds of over 20,000.

== Improvements ==
Since its opening, there have been a number of enhancements and improvements to the arena. In 2004, a new custom scoreboard debuted, which is 24 feet 3 inches (7.39 m) wide by 22 feet (6.7 m) tall, features four video screens, each 12 feet 6 inches (3.81 m) wide by 8 feet 10 inches (2.69 m) tall. (There is also a LED ring at the top that is used to display game statistics.) In 2005, the locker rooms were remodeled, and a lounge and meeting area were added. Prior to the 2008–09 season, eight luxury suites were added, raising the total to 47. In addition, courtside seating was added, the student section was reconfigured, and press seating was moved to the east side of the arena behind the basket. In 2008, LED ribbon boards were installed around the ring between the upper and lower decks. The addition of these improvements expanded seating to 19,368. Prior to the 2013-14 season, the press seating was moved to the southeast corner of the bottom bowl, with its prior location being used for an expanded student section.

== Nolan Richardson Court ==
On February 6, 2018, the University of Arkansas’s Associated Student Government Senate passed a resolution by Senator Clay Smith to encourage the University of Arkansas Athletic Department to name the court at the arena in honor of former Arkansas head coach Nolan Richardson.

On March 28, 2019, the University of Arkansas Board of Trustees voted unanimously to name the court in honor of former coach Richardson.

== Statistics of Bud Walton Arena ==
Attendance Record: 20,344 vs. Duke, November 29, 2023

Attendance Chart (men) for every year Bud Walton Arena has been in operation

Season	Overall Record	SEC Record	Overall Attendance	Average Attendance	Rank Nationally
1993–94	16–0 (1.000) (NCAA National Champions)	8–0 (1.000)	322,146	20,134	4th
1994–95	14–1 (.933) (NCAA Runner-Up)	7–1 (.875)	301,212	20,081	4th
1995–96	14–4 (.778)	6–2 (.750)	346,698	19,261	5th
1996–97	15–3 (.833)	6–2 (.750)	329,540	18,308	5th
1997–98	15–0 (1.000)	8–0 (1.000)	291,089	19,406	4th
1998–99	14–2 (.875)	6–2 (.750)	292,704	18,294	5th
1999–00	9–5 (.643)	5–3 (.625)	249,300	17,807	6th
2000–01	16–2 (.889)	7–1 (.875)	292,057	16,225	9th
2001–02	11–5 (.688)	5–3 (.625)	241,033	15,065	13th
2002–03	8–8 (.500)	3–5 (.375)	236,638	14,790	14th
2003–04	10–6 (.625)	4–4 (.500)	236,676	14,792	13th
2004–05	13–3 (.813)	5–3 (.625)	252,608	15,788	9th
2005–06	15–1 (.938)	7–1 (.875)	239,336	14,958	12th
2006–07	13–3 (.813)	5–3 (.625)	267,520	16,720	9th
2007–08	15–1 (.938)	7–1 (.875)	274,360	17,148	8th
2008–09	12–6 (.667)	2–6 (.250)	288,781	16,043	11th
2009–10	11–8 (.579)	5–3 (.625)	256,667	13,509	17th
2010–11	15–3 (.833)	5–3 (.625)	216,999	12,055	29th
2011–12	17–3 (.850)	5–3 (.625)	262,329	13,116	23rd
2012–13	17–1 (.944)	9–0 (1.000)	252,857	14,047	17th
2013–14	17–2 (.895)	7–2 (.778)	280,465	14,023	10th
2014–15	16–2 (.889)	7–2 (.778)	283,485	15,749	11th
2015–16	13–4 (.765)	6–3 (.667)	258,705	15,217	12th
2016–17	15–3 (.833)	6–3 (.667)	xxx,xxx	xx,xxx	nth
2017–18	15–2 (.882)	7–2 (.778)	xxx,xxx	xx,xxx	nth
2018–19	12–6 (.667)	5–4 (.555)	xxx,xxx	xx,xxx	nth
2019–20	14–4 (.778)	5–4 (.555)	xxx,xxx	xx,xxx	nth
2020-21	16-1 (.941)	8-1 (.888)	xxx,xxx	xxx,xxx	nth
Totals	332–74 (.817)	143–54 (.726)	6,273,705	16,197	Avg. Rank: 11th

== See also ==
- List of NCAA Division I basketball arenas
