= Lawrence County Courthouse (Arkansas) =

- U.S. National Register of Historic Places
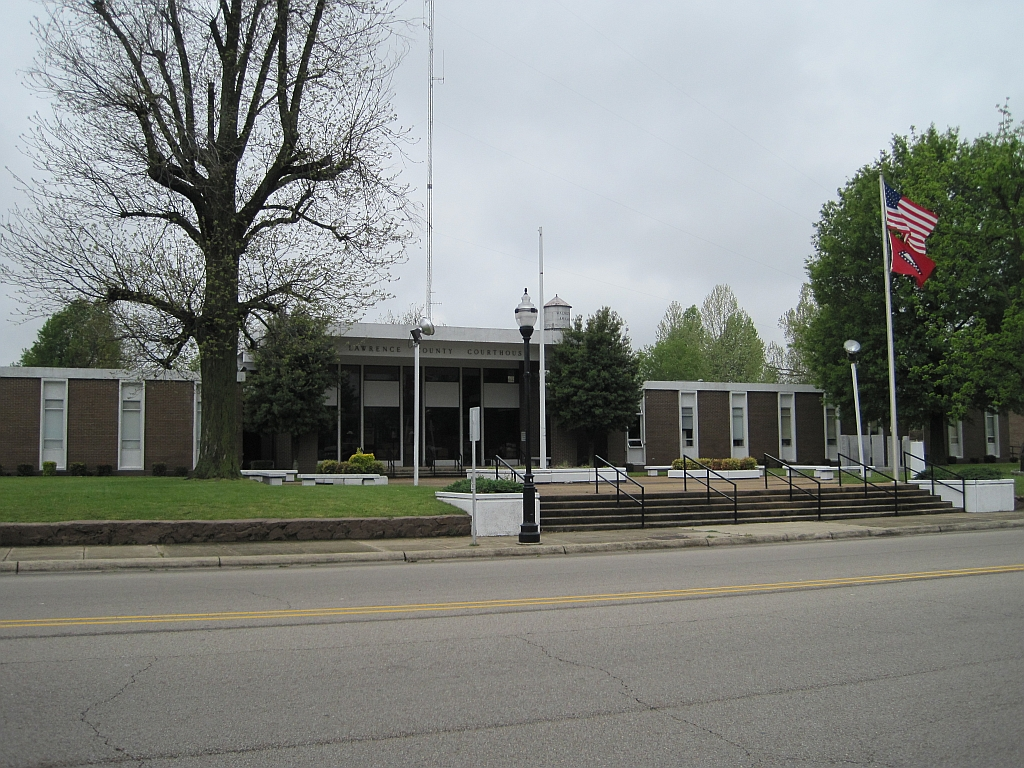

- Location within Arkansas Location within the United States
- Interactive map showing the location of Lawrence County Courthouse
- Location: 315 W. Main St., Walnut Ridge, Arkansas
- Coordinates: 36°4′12″N 90°57′28″W
- Area: 2.25 acres (0.91 ha)
- Built: 1966
- Architect: Erhart, Eichenbaum, Rauch & Blass
- Architectural style: New Formalism
- NRHP reference No.: 15000627
- Added to NRHP: September 28, 2015

The Lawrence County Courthouse is a courthouse at 315 West Main Street in the center of Walnut Ridge, Arkansas, United States, the county seat of Lawrence County. It is a modern single-story building, finished in brick with cast stone trim. It was designed by the Arkansas firm Erhart, Eichenbaum, Rauch & Blass, and was built in 1965–66. It stylistically embodies the New Formalism movement in architecture of that period, with tall and narrow windows topped by cast stone panels, and a flat-roof canopy sheltering a plate glass entrance area.

The building was listed on the National Register of Historic Places in 2015.

== See also ==
- National Register of Historic Places listings in Lawrence County, Arkansas
- List of county courthouses in Arkansas
