= Arkansas School for the Deaf =

Public school in Little Rock, Arkansas, US

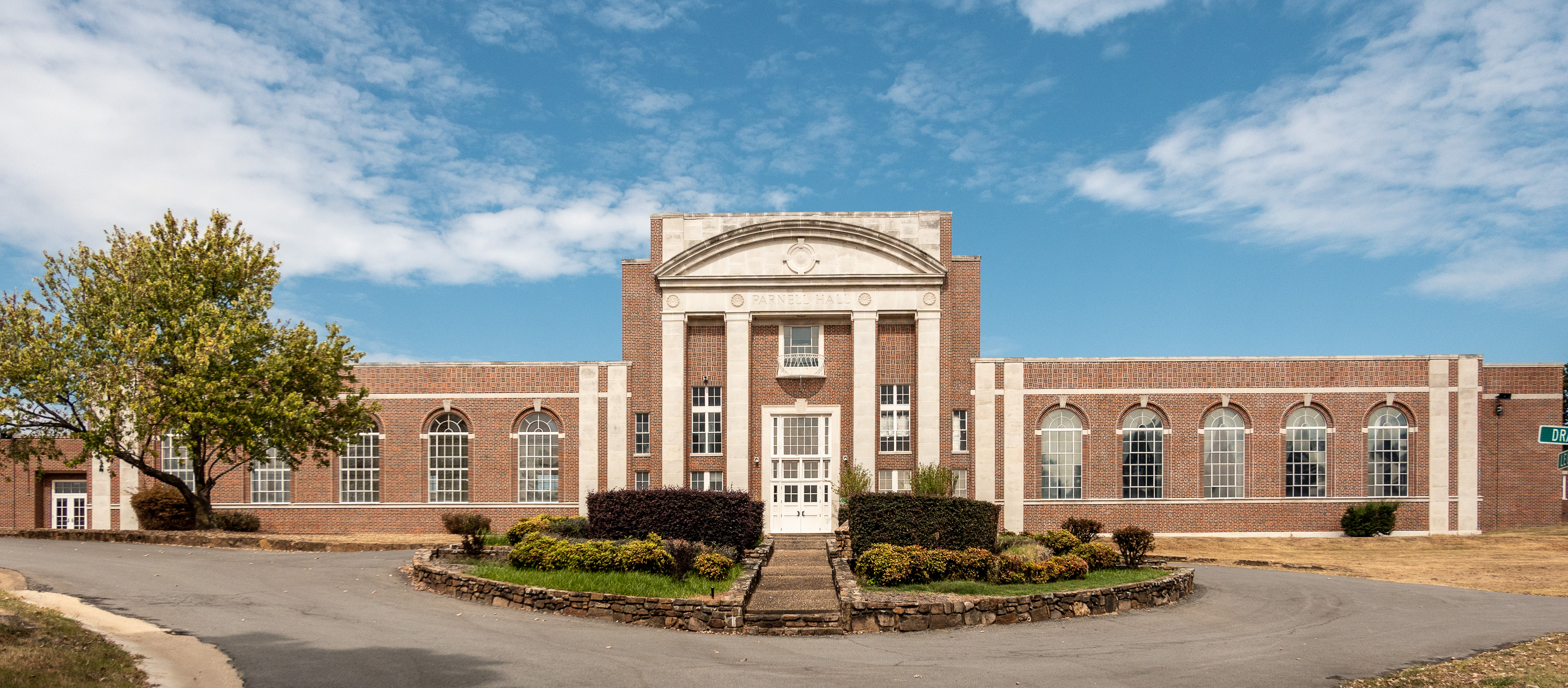
- Parnell Hall

Location
- 2400 West Markham Street; Little Rock, Pulaski County, Arkansas 72205; United States; 34°45′9″N 92°17′53″W

Information
- Type: Public/Deaf
- Founded: 1849 (177 years ago)
- School district: Arkansas School for the Deaf
- Superintendent: Nicole Walsh
- CEEB code: 041416
- Principal: Rayburn Boland
- Grades: PK–12
- Enrollment: 129 (district) (2010–11)
- Student to teacher ratio: 4.03
- Campus: 40 acres (16 ha)
- Colors: Blue and gold
- Athletics conference: GPSD and AACS
- Sports: Football, Soccer, Volleyball, Basketball, Cheer
- Mascot: Leopard
- Team name: Arkansas School for the Deaf Leopards
- Affiliations: Arkansas Association of the Deaf (AAD); National Association of the Deaf (NAD)
- Website: asd.ade.arkansas.gov

Arkansas School for the Deaf (ASD) is a state-run public school in Little Rock, Arkansas, United States, serving deaf and hard of hearing students through residential, day school, and part-time enrollment programs. It was founded in 1850. The school offers preschool through high school, and is affiliated with the Arkansas Association of the Deaf (AAD) and the National Association of the Deaf (NAD).

The school is located near the Arkansas School for the Blind (ASB) and both are administered by a five-member panel known as the Board of Trustees ASB-ASD. Rufus Henry Lamb (died December 24, 1896) was a student at the school, worked at it, and became principal of the "Negro Department".

The Arkansas Department of Education (ADE) classifies it as a school district.

== Campus ==
The campus includes dormitory facilities.

== Schools ==
Located within the same 40-acre (16 ha) campus are the following schools:

- Arkansas School for the Deaf High School – serves students in grades 9 through 12. The high school has been accredited by AdvancED since 1979.
- Arkansas School for the Deaf Middle School – serves students in grades 6 through 8.
- Arkansas School for the Deaf Elementary School – serves students in prekindergarten through grade 5. The elementary school is accredited by AdvancED since 1979.

=== Athletics ===
The Leopards are members of the National Deaf Interscholastic Athletic Association (NDIAA) and two different athletic conferences:

- The Great Plains Schools for the Deaf (GPSD) and,
- The Arkansas Association of Christian Schools (AACS).

The ASD Leopards compete in football, volleyball, cheer, basketball, soccer and Special Olympics. Throughout its history, ASD has competed against other Arkansas public and private schools administered by the Arkansas Activities Association (AAA).

ASD won a state basketball championship in 1949.

== See also ==
- Deaf education
- Arkansas School for the Blind
- Parnell Hall (Little Rock, Arkansas)
