= Parnell Hall (Little Rock, Arkansas) =

- U.S. National Register of Historic Places
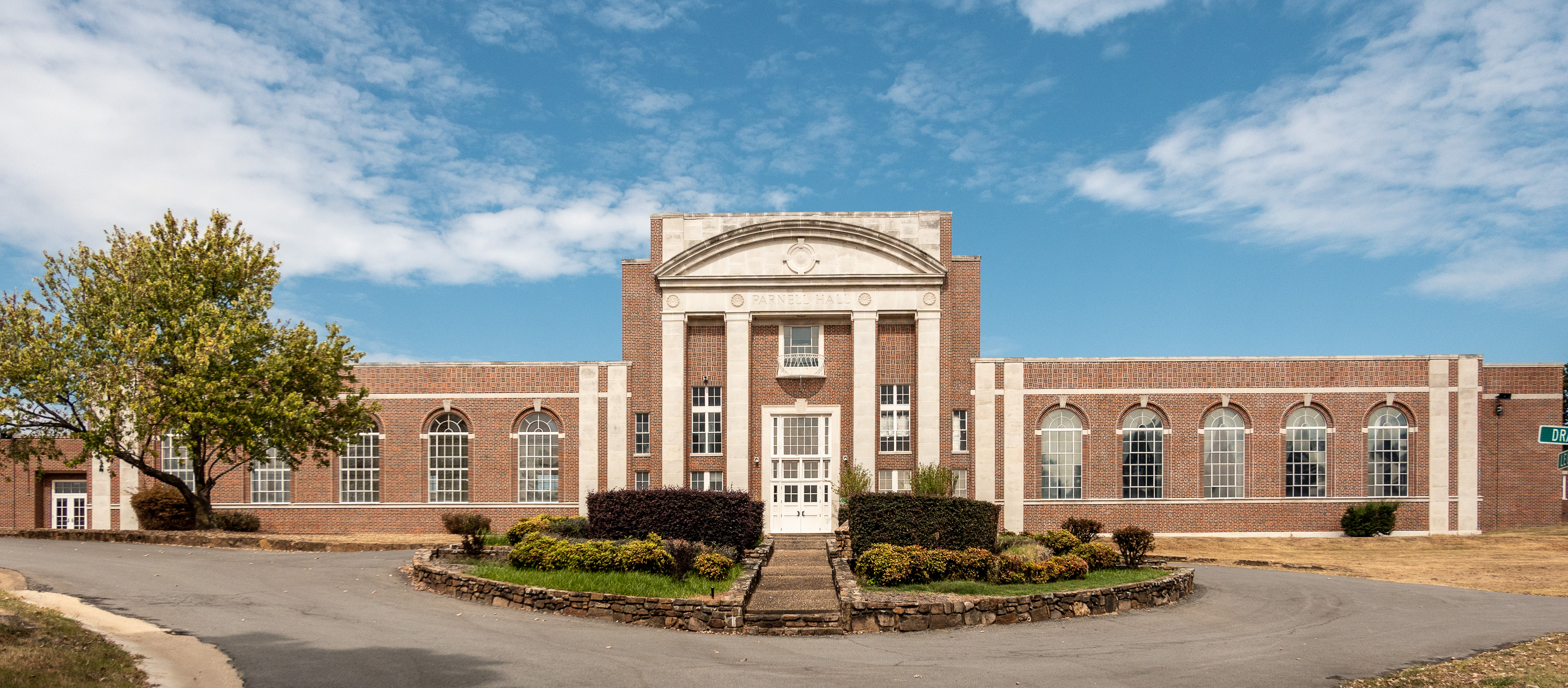

- Location within Arkansas Location within the United States
- Location: 2400 W. Markham, Little Rock, Arkansas
- Coordinates: 34°45′13″N 92°17′55″W
- Area: less than one acre
- Built: 1931
- Architect: Erhart & Eichenbaum
- Architectural style: Classical Revival
- NRHP reference No.: 07001431
- Added to NRHP: January 24, 2008

Parnell Hall is the central building of the campus of the Arkansas School for the Deaf on West Markham Road in Little Rock, Arkansas. It is a large 2 1/2-story Classical Revival building, designed by Erhart & Eichenbaum and completed in 1931. The school has long been the central educational facility for Arkansas's deaf population, with Parnell Hall playing a central role, providing classrooms, administrative facilities, and a large meeting hall.

The building was listed on the National Register of Historic Places in 2008.

== See also ==
- National Register of Historic Places listings in Little Rock, Arkansas
