= Cammack Village, Arkansas =

- City
- Logo

- Location of Cammack Village in Pulaski County, Arkansas.

- Location in the United States
- Coordinates: 34°46′51″N 92°20′42″W
- Country: United States
- State: Arkansas
- County: Pulaski
- Incorporated: 1943
- Named after: Wiley Dan Cammack

Government
  - Type: Mayor-council
  - Mayor: Cody Kees

Area
  - Total: 0.28 sq mi (0.73 km^{2})
  - Land: 0.28 sq mi (0.73 km^{2})
  - Water: 0 sq mi (0.00 km^{2})
- Elevation: 587 ft (179 m)

Population (2020)
  - Total: 778
  - Estimate (2025): 757 ▼
  - Density: 2,749.7/sq mi (1,061.67/km^{2})
- Time zone: UTC-6 (CST)
  - Summer (DST): UTC-5 (CDT)
- ZIP code: 72207
- Area code: 501
- FIPS code: 05-10780
- GNIS feature ID: 2403980
- Website: cammackvillage.org

Cammack Village is a city in Pulaski County, Arkansas, United States. The population was 778 as of the 2020 census. It is part of the Little Rock–North Little Rock–Conway metropolitan area.

== History ==
Cammack Village is located on land originally owned by Wiley Dan Cammack. During the 1930s, Cammack allowed the land to be used for a Works Progress Administration roads project. Sometime before 1943, Cammack attempted to have the land annexed by the city of Little Rock, which lay to the east, but the city demurred, stating the land was "too far west." Shortly after that, during World War II, Cammack turned the land over to the United States Government to alleviate military housing shortages at Camp Joseph T. Robinson, Little Rock's primary Army training base at the time. The houses were laid out in rows and built with 870 square feet (81 m^{2}) per unit, according to U.S. Army specifications for family housing. In order to provide for police and fire protection, Cammack pushed for the incorporation of the new neighborhood, which occurred on April 5, 1943.

Annexation efforts continued beyond Wiley Dan Cammack's first attempt. On October 3, 1946, supporters of annexation from both Little Rock and Cammack Village presented a petition for the annexation of Cammack Village to the city of Little Rock to the county clerk of Pulaski County. The petition was approved by the City Council of Little Rock, and the county court ordered that an election be held to determine the will of the voters of both Little Rock and Cammack Village in regard to annexation.

The election was held on November 19, 1946. The returns, as canvassed by the county court, showed that in Little Rock 308 electors voted for the proposed annexation and 112 electors voted against it, and that in Cammack Village 141 electors voted for the annexation and 139 electors voted against it. Because the proposal received a majority of the votes cast in each municipality, on November 26, 1946, Judge L. A. Mashburn issued an order annexing the city.

Following the order, John Coryn, an opponent of annexation, filed suit in the Third Division Circuit Court contesting the election. In his complaint, he alleged that the petition for annexation was improperly filed with the county clerk prior to its presentation to the City Council of Little Rock, that an insufficient number of electors signed this petition, that the officials holding said election were not properly named, and that seven of the 141 persons who voted in favor of said annexation in Cammack Village were not qualified voters. Coryn sought a judgment declaring that the proposal had failed to carry and that the order of annexation was invalid. The court ultimately directed that the cause be put in abeyance to allow proponents of the annexation the opportunity to file a writ of prohibition, which they did on February 10, 1947. See Russell v. Cockrill, 199 S.W.2d 584 (Ark. 1947). This writ, however, was ultimately denied, and Coryn and other opponents of the annexation prevailed.

Cammack Village is an enclave as it is completely surrounded by the City of Little Rock. Cammack Village relies upon Little Rock for its water, sewer, power services, and fire protection services. As of January 1, 2014, BFI Waste Services, LLC provides sanitation services for the city. Cammack Village maintains a police force of one to three officers. City government consists of an elected mayor and aldermen, along with a city attorney, recorder, and treasurer. The city maintains two parks, and Jefferson Elementary School of the Little Rock School District is located within its borders.

On April 3, 2008, Cammack Village was a topic of national discussion as it was ravaged by an EF1 tornado that passed through northern Little Rock.

On March 31, 2023, a large portion of Cammack Village sustained severe damage as a result of an EF3 tornado.

== Economy ==
As of January 2007, Cammack Village does not have a local sales tax enacted; however a 6% state and 1% county sales tax does still apply to applicable transactions inside the city limits. The city's operating budget comes from its share of the countywide sales tax. It is also a notorious speed trap; the speed limit for the city is 25 miles per hour (40 km/h). No businesses operate in Cammack Village.

== Geography ==
According to the United States Census Bureau, the city has a total area of 0.3 square miles (0.78 km^{2}), all land.

== Demographics ==
Historical population
Census	Pop.	Note	%±
1950	987		—
1960	1,355		37.3%
1970	1,165		−14.0%
1980	920		−21.0%
1990	828		−10.0%
2000	831		0.4%
2010	768		−7.6%
2020	778		1.3%
2025 (est.)	757	▼	−2.7%
U.S. Decennial Census

=== 2020 census ===
Cammack Village racial composition
Race	Number	Percentage
White (non-Hispanic)	694	89.2%
Black or African American (non-Hispanic)	9	1.16%
Asian	8	1.03%
Other/Mixed	35	4.5%
Hispanic or Latino	32	4.11%

As of the 2020 United States census, there were 778 people, 362 households, and 199 families residing in the city.

=== 2000 census ===
As of the census of 2000, there were 831 people, 395 households, and 240 families residing in the city. The population density was 2,893.1 inhabitants per square mile (1,117.0/km^{2}). There were 406 housing units at an average density of 1,413.5 per square mile (545.8/km^{2}). The racial makeup of the city was 97.83% White, 0.96% Black or African American, 0.36% Native American, 0.24% Asian, 0.36% from other races, and 0.24% from two or more races. 1.44% of the population were Hispanic or Latino of any race.

There were 395 households, out of which 27.6% had children under the age of 18 living with them, 47.8% were married couples living together, 11.6% had a female householder with no husband present, and 39.0% were non-families. 33.7% of all households were made up of individuals, and 9.9% had someone living alone who was 65 years of age or older. The average household size was 2.10 and the average family size was 2.70.

In the city, the population was spread out, with 21.7% under the age of 18, 4.8% from 18 to 24, 36.7% from 25 to 44, 19.0% from 45 to 64, and 17.8% who were 65 years of age or older. The median age was 36 years. For every 100 females, there were 76.1 males. For every 100 females age 18 and over, there were 72.7 males.

The median income for a household in the city was $40,909, and the median income for a family was $45,833. Males had a median income of $50,795 versus $33,021 for females. The per capita income for the city was $29,865. About 9.1% of families and 7.6% of the population were below the poverty line, including 12.2% of those under age 18 and none of those age 65 or over.

== Neighborhoods ==
Cammack Village is divided into four subdivisions: Cammack Woods, Jefferson Heights, Palisades Estates, and Pinnacle Point. Today, the city primarily comprises the original military housing located in the Cammack Woods subdivision, though many have been enlarged from their original 870 square feet (81 m^{2}). Several mansions were also later built on its north end, in the Palisades Estates and Pinnacle Point subdivisions, overlooking the Arkansas River.

== Education ==
Cammack Village is within the Little Rock School District (LRSD).

Thomas Jefferson Elementary School is within Cammack Village, with the entire village zoned to it. Its namesake is Thomas Jefferson, a previous President of the United States. The Cammack family donated the land to the LRSD, which opened the school in 1950. Expansions came in 1954, 1968, and 1996 and a renovation came in 2002. The 1996 addition was an entire wing.

For secondary levels students are zoned to Pulaski Heights Middle School and Little Rock Central High School.
