= Southwest Conference men's basketball tournament =

Southwest Conference men's basketball tournament (defunct)
- Conference basketball championship
- Sport: College basketball
- Conference: Southwest Conference
- Format: Single-elimination tournament
- Played: 1976–1996
- Most championships: Arkansas (6)

Host stadiums
- Moody Coliseum (1976); The Summit (1977–1979, 1984); HemisFair Arena (1980–1981); Reunion Arena (1982–1983, 1985–1996)

Host locations
- Dallas (1976, 1982–1983, 1985–1996); Houston (1977–1979, 1984); San Antonio (1980–1981)

The Southwest Conference men's basketball tournament, also called the SWC Classic, was the conference championship tournament in men's basketball for the Southwest Conference. The tournament was held annually between 1976 and 1996, after which the Southwest Conference was dissolved.

The winner of the tournament was guaranteed a spot in the NCAA basketball tournament each year.

== Tournament champions by year ==
Year	Champion	Score	Runner-up	Most Outstanding Player	Venue (city, state)
1976	Texas Tech	74–72	Texas A&M	Rick Bullock, Texas Tech	Moody Coliseum (Dallas, Texas)
1977	Arkansas	84–70	Houston	Ron Brewer, Arkansas	The Summit (Houston, Texas)
1978	Houston	92–90	Texas	Mike Schultz, Houston	The Summit (Houston, Texas)
1979	Arkansas	39–38	Texas	Sidney Moncrief, Arkansas	The Summit (Houston, Texas)
1980	Texas A&M	52–50	Arkansas	David Britton, Texas A&M	HemisFair Arena (San Antonio, Texas)
1981	Houston	84–59	Texas	Rob Williams, Houston	HemisFair Arena (San Antonio, Texas)
1982	Arkansas	84–69	Houston	Alvin Robertson, Arkansas	Reunion Arena (Dallas, Texas)
1983	Houston	62–59	TCU	Michael Young, Houston	Reunion Arena (Dallas, Texas)
1984	Houston	57–56	Arkansas	Akeem Olajuwon, Houston	The Summit (Houston, Texas)
1985	Texas Tech	67–64	Arkansas	Joe Kleine, Arkansas	Reunion Arena (Dallas, Texas)
1986	Texas Tech	67–63	Texas A&M	Tony Benford, Texas Tech	Reunion Arena (Dallas, Texas)
1987	Texas A&M	71–46	Baylor	Winston Crite, Texas A&M	Reunion Arena (Dallas, Texas)
1988	SMU	75–64	Baylor	Micheal Williams, Baylor	Reunion Arena (Dallas, Texas)
1989	Arkansas	100–76	Texas	Lenzie Howell, Arkansas	Reunion Arena (Dallas, Texas)
1990	Arkansas	96–84	Houston	Todd Day, Arkansas	Reunion Arena (Dallas, Texas)
1991	Arkansas	120–89	Texas	Oliver Miller, Arkansas	Reunion Arena (Dallas, Texas)
1992	Houston	91–72	Texas	Dexter Cambridge, Texas	Reunion Arena (Dallas, Texas)
1993	Texas Tech	88–76	Houston	Lance Hughes, Texas Tech	Reunion Arena (Dallas, Texas)
1994	Texas	87–62	Texas A&M	B. J. Tyler, Texas	Reunion Arena (Dallas, Texas)
1995	Texas	107–104 ^{OT}	Texas Tech	Terrence Rencher, Texas	Reunion Arena (Dallas, Texas)
1996	Texas Tech	75–73	Texas	Reggie Freeman, Texas	Reunion Arena (Dallas, Texas)

== Championships by school ==
School	Championships	Years
Arkansas	6	1977, 1979, 1982, 1989, 1990, 1991
Houston	5	1978, 1981, 1983, 1984, 1992
Texas Tech	5	1976, 1985, 1986, 1993, 1996
Texas	2	1994, 1995
Texas A&M	2	1980, 1987
SMU	1	1988
Baylor	0	–
Rice	0	–
TCU	0	–

== Television coverage ==
Year	Network	Play-by-play	Analyst
1991	ABC	Roger Twibell	Joe B. Hall
1989	Raycom	Ron Franklin	Bob Ortegel
1987	Raycom	Merle Harmon	Bob Ortegel
1984	NBC; TVS	Phil Stone; Frank Fallon	Bucky Waters; Dan Spika
1983	NBC	Frank Fallon	Dan Spika
1979	Metro Communications	Frank Glieber	Billy Packer and John Wooden

== See also ==
- Big 12 men's basketball tournament
- SEC men's basketball tournament
- Conference USA men's basketball tournament
- Southwest Conference women's basketball tournament
