= History of the Milwaukee Bucks =

The Milwaukee Bucks jersey logo in 2006

The Milwaukee Bucks are an American professional basketball team, competing in the National Basketball Association. The team has won two league championships (1971, 2021), three conference titles (Western: 1971, 1974, Eastern: 2021), and 19 division titles (1971–1974, 1976, 1980–1986, 2001, 2019–2024). They have featured such notable players as Kareem Abdul-Jabbar, Oscar Robertson, Bob Dandridge, Sidney Moncrief, Bob Lanier, Terry Cummings, Glenn Robinson, Ray Allen, Michael Redd, Giannis Antetokounmpo, and Khris Middleton among others. Abdul-Jabbar and Antetokounmpo have been named the NBA's Most Valuable Player while playing for the Bucks, for a total of five MVP awards. They both are also the only players to win Finals MVP for the franchise. The Bucks are the only team to have won a championship in both the Eastern and Western Conference.

== 1968–1969: Team creation ==
On January 22, 1968, a franchise was awarded by the NBA to Milwaukee Professional Sports and Services (shortened to Milwaukee Pro), a group headed by businessmen Wesley Pavlon and Marvin Fishman. Over 40,000 fans participated in the contest to name the team, with the name Robins winning, however, the owners of the team decided to go with the second-most popular name, Bucks, in reference to Wisconsin's state wild animal, the white-tailed deer. A fan, R. D. Trebilcox, famously suggested the name, quoting that Bucks were "spirited, good jumpers, fast and agile". As an award for the part he played in the naming of the team, he was gifted a new car. After 13 years, an NBA franchise had returned to Milwaukee after the Hawks relocated to the city of St. Louis. in Expansion draft notable players selected of Wayne Embry, Guy Rodgers and Jon McGlocklin. On October 16, 1968, the Bucks played their first NBA regular-season match, against the Chicago Bulls, before a meagre crowd of 8,467 people. They won only 27 games in the year.

== 1969–1975: The Kareem Abdul-Jabbar era ==
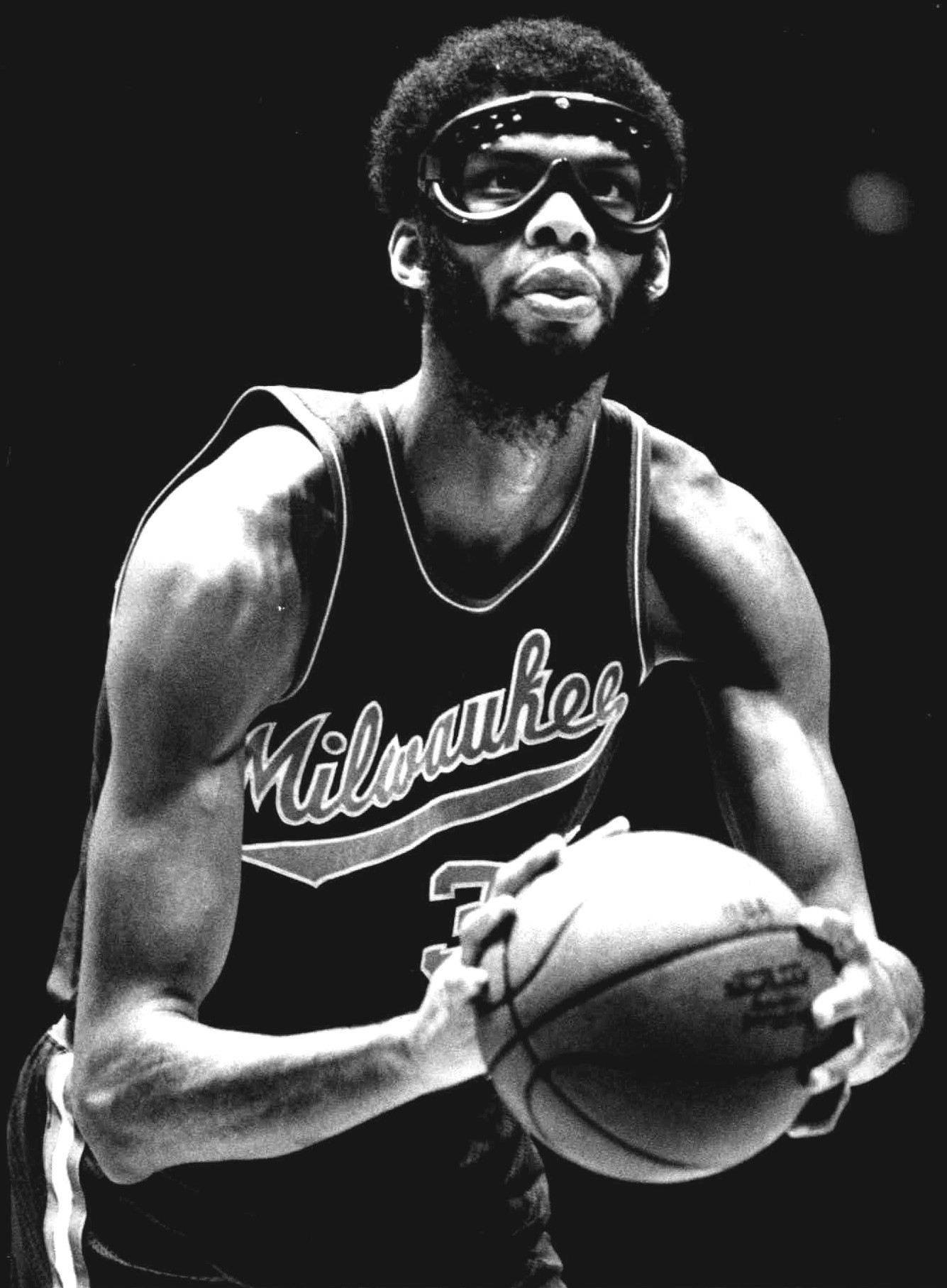
Kareem Abdul-Jabbar (Lew Alcindor) playing with the Bucks in 1974

The Bucks faced off in a coin flip between their fellow expansion team of that year, the Phoenix Suns. By that point, the general consensus around the league was that Lew Alcindor would be selected as the first pick. While the Bucks won the first pick, they had to win a bidding war with the New York Nets of the rival American Basketball Association (ABA). They were successful, and drafted Alcindor with the first pick. The Bucks also selected Bob Dandridge in fourth round.

=== 1970–1971: First Championship ===
In 1970 the Bucks acquired Oscar Robertson from the Cincinnati Royals in exchange for Flynn Robinson. They also acquired Bob Boozer and second year guard Lucius Allen from the Seattle SuperSonics. Before the season, the Bucks switched to being a Western Conference team. Robertson and Alcindor were a dominant duo, leading the bucks to 66 wins for the year. During the year, they had a then-NBA record 20 wins in a row. Robertson led the team to their first title in 1971, sweeping the Baltimore Bullets in four games.

=== 1971–1973: Loss in the Conference Finals ===
In the beginning of the 1971-72 season the Bucks started with a 7-1 record.

In 1972, Alcindor announced his name change to Kareem Abdul-Jabbar after he had privately converted to Islam. With Abdul-Jabbar and Robertson leading the way, the Bucks remained a powerhouse for the remainder of the early 1970s. The Bucks reached the Conference Finals for the third year in a row but were eliminated by the Los Angeles Lakers in a six-game series.

=== 1973–1974: Conference Championship ===
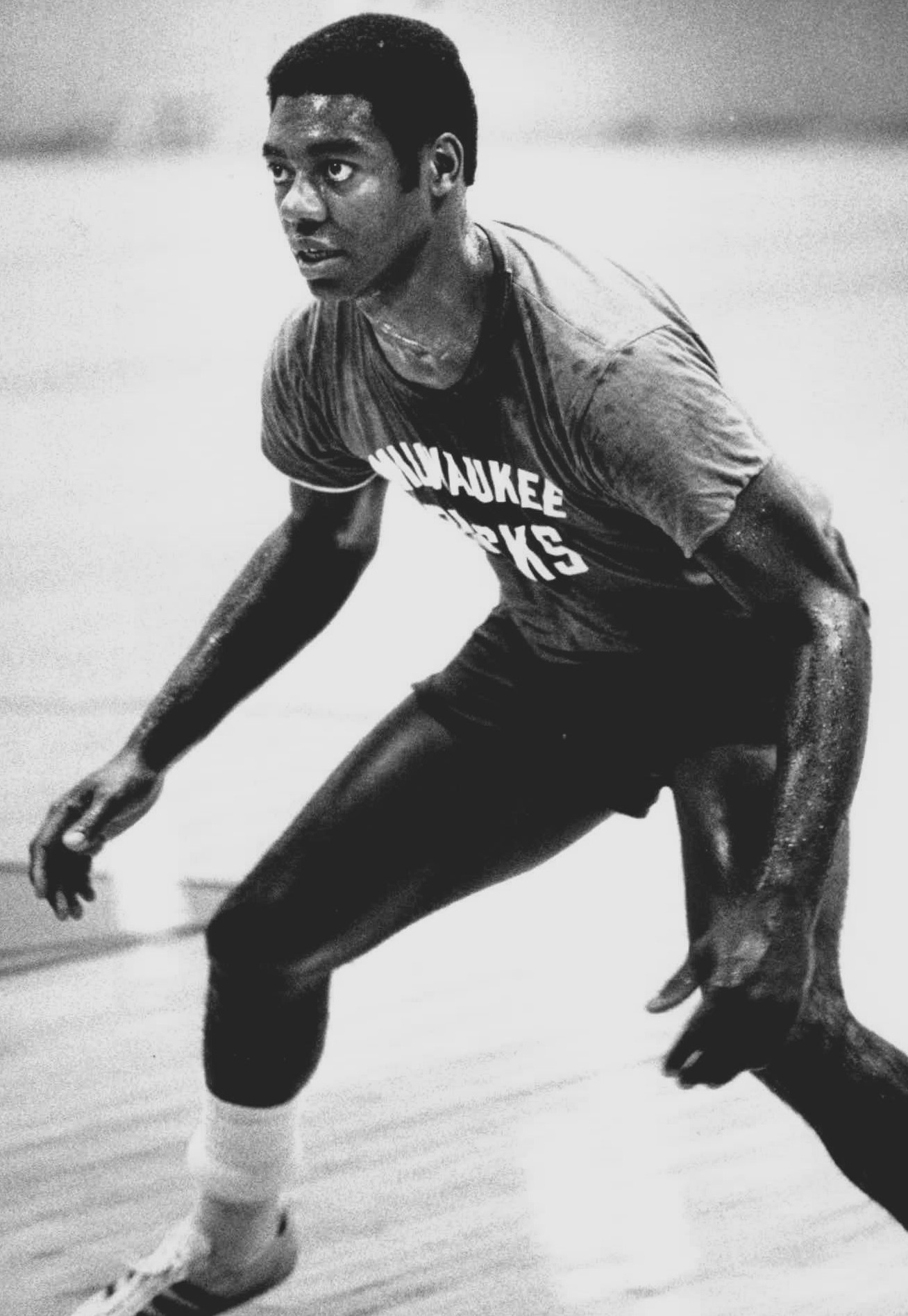
Oscar Robertson playing for the Bucks

In 1973, the Bucks recorded their third 60+ win season in a row, but suffered many injuries and recorded an early exit from the playoffs. Come 1974, the Bucks returned to the NBA Finals against the Boston Celtics. During Game 6, Abdul-Jabbar first made his iconic "sky hook' shot in an exciting double-overtime win. However, the Celtics won Game 7, and their efforts went unrewarded.

=== 1974–1975: Missing the Playoffs ===
When Oscar Robertson retired the Bucks finished last in their division, a stark contrast to their successes in prior years, even while maintaining the services of their superstar Abdul-Jabbar.

== 1975–1979: Rebuilding ==
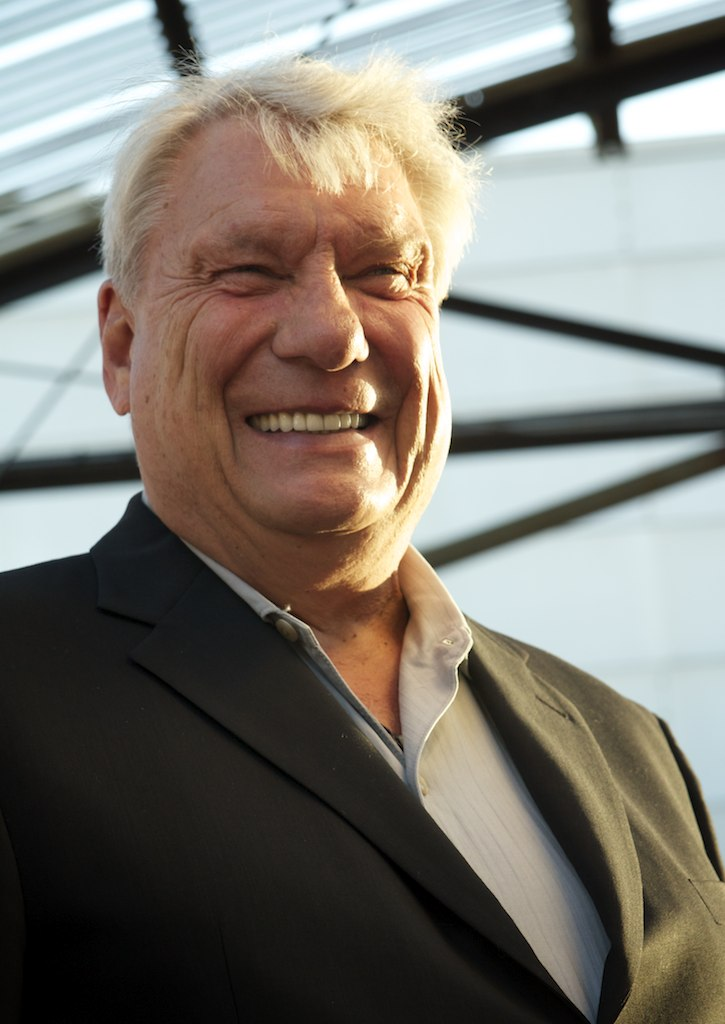
Don Nelson, head coach of the Bucks

On June 16, 1975 the Bucks traded Kareem Abdul-Jabbar to the Los Angeles Lakers in exchange for Elmore Smith, Brian Winters and two rookies, Dave Meyers and Junior Bridgeman. The Bucks finished the 1975-76 season with a record 38-44 and won the division title; however the Bucks lost to the Detroit Pistons in the first round of the playoffs.

In offseason the Bucks drafted Quinn Buckner in first round and Alex English in second round.

On November 13, 1976 the Bucks hired Don Nelson as the second head coach in franchise history.

In the 1977 NBA Draft the Bucks selected Kent Benson with the number one pick, Marques Johnson with the third pick and Ernie Grunfeld with the eleventh pick. On November 25, 1977, the day after Thanksgiving, and on the road, the Bucks overcame the largest 4th quarter deficit in NBA history, defeating the Atlanta Hawks after being down by 29 points with only 8:43 left in the game. Atlanta led 111–82 before Milwaukee went on a 35–4 run to win 117–115 in regulation. The Bucks finished the 1977-78 season with 44-38 as their record, behind the Denver Nuggets. In 1978 NBA playoffs the Bucks sweep the Phoenix Suns in first round in two games and then they lost to the Denver Nuggets of Conference Semifinals in seven games.

== 1979–1989: The Sidney Moncrief era ==
On June 25, 1979, the Bucks selected Sidney Moncrief with the fifth pick in the 1979 NBA Draft. As well the Bucks acquired Harvey Catchings and Richard Washington and 1978 3rd round draft pick Pat Cummings. The Bucks started the 1979-80 season with a 29-27 record. On February 4, 1980 the Bucks acquired Bob Lanier from the Detroit Pistons in exchange for Kent Benson and a first round pick. The Bucks finished the season with a record of 49-33 and won their division title for first time since the 1975-76 season. In the playoffs the Bucks faced the defending champions, the Seattle SuperSonics. They lost in a close seven game series.

Before the 1980-81 season, the Bucks switched to being in the Central Division of the Eastern Conference. The Bucks won the division title for the second straight year but they lost against the defending Eastern Conference champion, the Philadelphia 76ers in seven games.

In 1981-82 season the Bucks won their third straight division title but they lost against the Philadelphia 76ers in six games.

In the offseason of 1982, the Bucks acquired Dave Cowens from the Boston Celtics in exchange for Quinn Buckner and they finished the season with a record of 51-31 and won their fourth straight division title, and in the playoffs the Bucks swept the Boston Celtics in four games, but they lost against the Philadelphia 76ers in the Conference Finals.

In the offseason of 1983, the Bucks signed guards Nate Archibald and Kevin Grevey, and they finished the season with a record of 50-32. In the playoffs the Bucks beat the Atlanta Hawks in the first round in five games then the Bucks beat the New Jersey Nets in the Conference Semifinals and before they eventually lost to that year's champion, the Boston Celtics in the conference finals.

In the offseason of 1984, the Bucks acquired Terry Cummings, Craig Hodges and Ricky Pierce form the Los Angeles Clippers in exchange for Junior Bridgeman, Harvey Catchings and Marques Johnson, and the Bucks finished the 1984-85 season with a record of 59-23 and won division title for the sixth straight time in the last six seasons. In 1985 NBA Playoffs the Bucks beat the Bulls in four games of the first round and they lost against the Philadelphia 76ers in four games.

In the offseason of 1986, the Bucks acquired Jack Sikma from the Seattle SuperSonics in exchange for Alton Lister.

In 1987 Del Harris was named as their new head coach. The Bucks started the 1987-88 Season without Moncrief in 17th games until he returns on December 11, 1987 when the Bucks played against the Portland Trail Blazers. In the trade period, the Bucks acquired Larry Krystkowiak from the San Antonio Spurs and Jay Humphries from the Phoenix Suns in exchange for Craig Hodges.

Before the 1988-89 season, the Bucks moved into their new arena, the Bradley Center, then acquired Fred Roberts from the expansion team, the Miami Heat and drafted Iowa State guard Jeff Grayer with the 13th pick. The Bucks season begin with a struggled with a 3–4 start to the regular season, but later on posted a six-game winning streak in January, and held a 30–15 record at the All-Star break. The team finished in fourth place in the Division with a 49–33 record, and earned the fifth seed in the Conference. In the Eastern Conference First Round of the 1989 NBA playoffs, the Bucks lost Game 1 to the 4th-seeded Atlanta Hawks on the road, 100–92, but managed to beat them in five games. However the Bucks lost to eventual champions Detroit Pistons in four straight games.

== 1989–1994: Hard period for the team. ==
In the 1989 offseason, Sidney Moncrief retired after ten seasons with the team and Terry Cummings was traded to the San Antonio Spurs for All-Star guard Alvin Robertson and Greg Anderson. Early into the season, the Bucks defeated the Seattle SuperSonics in a quintuple-overtime game on November 9, 155–154 at the Bradley Center. In the trade period, the Bucks acquired Brad Lohaus from the Minnesota Timberwolves, an expansion team, in exchange for Randy Breuer. The Bucks finished Third in division and made playoffs. In the playoffs the Bucks lost against Chicago Bulls in four games.

In the 1990 offseason, the Bucks acquired Frank Brickowski from the San Antonio Spurs and Danny Schayes from the Denver Nuggets. The Bucks started the season on a strong note winning their first 18 home games on their way to a 25–8 start. However, they would lose ten of their next twelve games, and held a 30–19 record at the All-Star break. Sixth man Ricky Pierce and Alvin Robertson were both selected for the 1991 NBA All-Star Game; it was Pierce's only All-Star appearance. During the trade period, Pierce was traded to the Seattle SuperSonics in exchange for Dale Ellis. In April, the team signed free agent and former All-Star forward Adrian Dantley, as Ellis went down with a lower back injury. The Bucks would make their 12th consecutive playoff appearance finishing third in the Central Division with a 48–34 record, while posting a 33–8 home record at the Bradley Center. However, without Ellis in the Eastern Conference First Round of the playoffs, the Bucks were swept by the 5th-seeded Philadelphia 76ers in three straight games.

In the offseason 1991, the Bucks signed free agent and former All-Star forward Moses Malone. After an 8–9 start to the season, head coach Del Harris resigned and was replaced with interim Frank Hamblen.

On May 11, 1992, the Bucks hired Mike Dunleavy as their new head coach. On June 24, 1992 the Bucks acquired Blue Edwards and second-year guard Eric Murdock from the Utah Jazz. Later that day, the Bucks selected Arkansas guards Todd Day and Lee Mayberry in the 1992 NBA Draft. The Bucks got off to a strong start, winning 10 of their first 13 games. However, they would struggle as they went on an 11-game losing streak in December, then posted a 7-game losing streak in January, and held a 20–31 record at the All-Star break. In midseason the Bucks traded away Alvin Robertson to the Detroit Pistons for Orlando Woolridge. The Bucks lost their final eight games of the season, finishing last place in the Central Division with a disappointing 28–54 record.

After the franchise's 25th anniversary in 1993, the Bucks overhauled their logo and uniforms. The colors were green, purple, and silver. The old logo, which featured a cartoonish deer, was replaced in favor of a more realistic one. The primary color scheme was altered as well, when red was supplanted by purple. Purple road uniforms replaced the former green away uniforms.

In the 1993 NBA Draft the Bucks selected Vin Baker with the eighth pick. In offseason the Bucks signed Ken Norman. The 1993-94 season began with struggled all season long posting a 10-game losing streak early into the season, and held a 14–34 record at the All-Star break.

== 1994–2003: The Glenn Robinson and Ray Allen era ==
In 1994 NBA Draft, the Bucks won the #1 pick and they selected "Big Dog" Glenn Robinson out of Purdue University. After the Bucks got 5–3 start to the season, the Bucks went on a nine-game losing streak between November and December.

In offseason The Bucks received the eleventh overall pick in the 1995 NBA draft, and selected Gary Trent out of Ohio University, but soon traded him to the Portland Trail Blazers in exchange for shooting guard, and top draft pick Shawn Respert out of Michigan State University they also re-signed Terry Cummings, and acquired former All-Star center Kevin Duckworth from the Washington Bullets. Early into the regular season, they traded Todd Day and Alton Lister to the Boston Celtics in exchange for Sherman Douglas, and dealt Eric Murdock and second-year forward Eric Mobley to the expansion Vancouver Grizzlies in exchange for Benoit Benjamin. However, the team continued to underachieve holding an 18–27 record at the All-Star break. After holding a 21–35 record as of March 2, 1996, and with Duckworth only playing just eight games due to a knee injury sustained during the preseason, the team suffered a dreadful 15-game losing streak in March. The Bucks missed the NBA playoffs for the fifth consecutive year, finishing in seventh place in the Central Division with a disappointing 25–57 record. Following the season, head coach Mike Dunleavy was fired after coaching the Bucks for four seasons.

In 1996 NBA Draft, the Bucks traded for the draft rights to Ray Allen with the Minnesota Timberwolves, in exchange for the draft rights to Stephon Marbury. The Bucks appeared to be on their way breaking out of the gate with a 15–11 start. However, they could not maintain that momentum as they slipped under .500, holding a 21–26 record at the All-Star break. The Bucks lost eight straight games between February and March and missing the playoffs sixth time in last sixth season with a 33–49 record.

In offseason 1997 the Bucks acquired Tyrone Hill and Terrell Brandon from three-teams deal. After an 11–8 start to the 1997-98 season, the Bucks slipped under .500, but then posted a six-game winning streak between January and February, and held a 24–23 record at the All-Star break. However, with Glenn Robinson out for the remainder of the season with a knee injury after 56 games, the Bucks struggled and went on a nine-game losing streak in March; Brandon only played just 50 games due to an ankle injury, and Hill only played 57 games due to a knee injury, and a strained back. The Bucks finished in seventh place in the Central Division with a 36–46 record, missing the playoffs in seven consecutive seasons.

In the 1998 NBA draft the Bucks selected German basketball star Dirk Nowitzki, but soon traded him to the Dallas Mavericks in exchange for power forward, and top draft pick Robert Traylor from the University of Michigan. On August 29, 1998 the Bucks hired former Seattle SuperSonics head coach George Karl as the next head coach of the team As well they signed Dell Curry and Vinny Del Negro in the offseason. During the trade period, the Bucks acquired Sam Cassell, Tim Thomas, Scott Williams and Chris Gatling from a four-team deal. The Bucks made the playoffs for the first time since 1991 but they lost to the Indiana Pacers in the first round in three games.

In the offseason, the Bucks acquired Danny Manning and Dale Ellis and signed J. R. Reid and Darvin Ham. After missing most of the previous season with an ankle injury, Sam Cassell played a full season as the Bucks won their first three games, and played above .500 in the first half of the season, holding a 26–24 record at the All-Star break. However, they struggled in February posting a 3–9 record as Ellis was traded to the Charlotte Hornets and Haywoode Workman was released to free agency and signed with the Toronto Raptors. With less than a month to go, the Bucks playoff chances appeared bleak as they had a 32–37 record in late March. However, down the stretch, they won 10 of their final 13 games to sneak into the playoffs as the #8 seed in the Eastern Conference, finishing fifth in the Central Division with a 42–40 record.

In the 2000-01 season, the Bucks got off to a rough start losing nine of their first twelve games, but would win 23 of their next 29 games while posting an 8-game winning streak in January, and holding a 29–18 record at the All-Star break and won the division title for the first time since the 1985-86 season. In playoffs the Bucks defeated the Orlando Magic in four games of the first round. It was the first time the Bucks made it out of the NBA playoffs' first round since 1988–89 season. In the Eastern Conference Semi-finals, they trailed 3–2 against the 6th-seeded Charlotte Hornets, but managed to win the series in seven games, advancing to the conference finals for the first time since 1986. In the Eastern Conference finals, the Bucks faced regular season MVP Allen Iverson and the top-seeded Philadelphia 76ers. The Bucks took a 2–1 series lead, but would lose to the Sixers in seven games. Williams, who had started every game during the Bucks' postseason run, was controversially suspended hours before Game 7 of the Eastern Conference finals series, when a flagrant one foul was upgraded to a flagrant two foul after the game had ended.

In offseason 2001 the Bucks trade away Scott Williams to the Denver Nuggets and signing Anthony Mason. The Bucks got off to a solid start by winning nine of their first ten games of the 2001-02 season, but then lost five straight afterwards. The team posted an 8-game winning streak in January, which led them to a division-leading record of 26–13 as of January 21, 2002 and held a 28–18 record at the All-Star break. However, with a 35–25 record as of March 6, the Bucks struggled and lost 16 of their final 22 games of the season, and missed the NBA playoffs by finishing in fifth place in the Central Division with a 41–41 record; on the final day of the regular season, the Bucks suffered an embarrassing 123–89 road loss to the Detroit Pistons at The Palace of Auburn Hills on April 17, 2002. This was one of the biggest late-season collapses for a team that was contending for a Division title in March.

In offseason 2002 the Bucks trade Glenn Robinson to the Atlanta Hawks exchange for Toni Kukoč, Leon Smith and 1st round pick. In 2002-03 season of transition for the Bucks played mediocre basketball with a 14–20 start, but then won 13 of their next 16 games, and held a 25–23 record at the All-Star break. In February 2003, just before the trading deadline, the Bucks dealt 3-time All-Star shooting guard Ray Allen to the Seattle SuperSonics in exchange for 34 year-old All-Star point guard Gary Payton and Desmond Mason.

== 2003–2009: The Michael Redd era ==
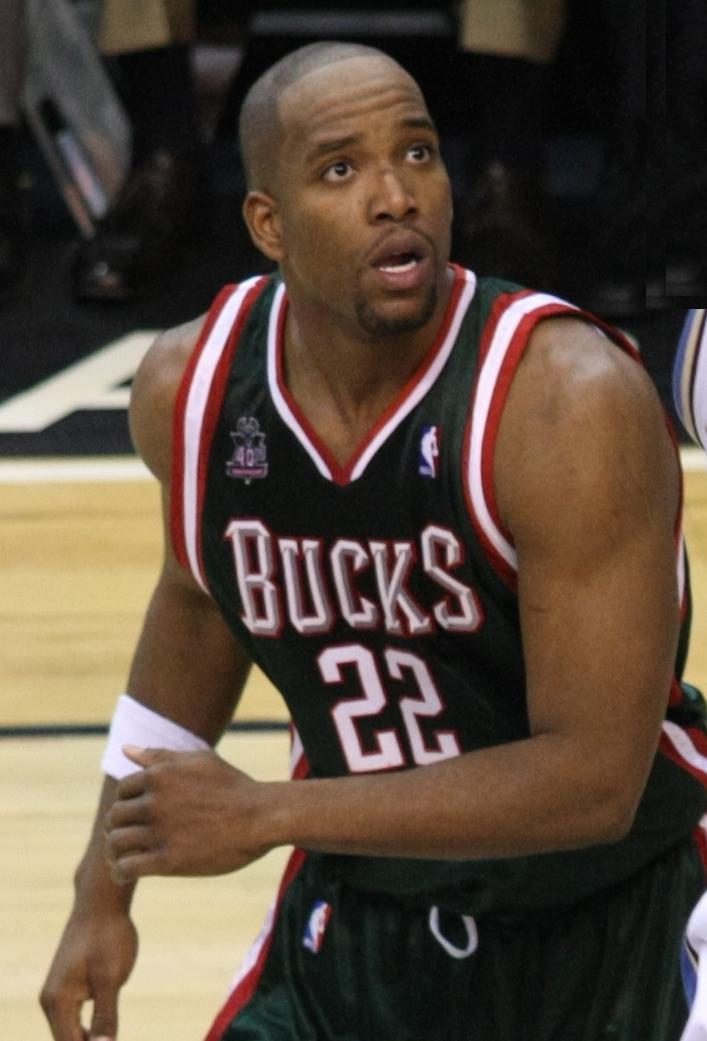
Michael Redd in 2008

In the summer of 2003, the Bucks hired Larry Harris as their next general manager. During the new era, Michael Redd blossomed into an all-star and a perimeter shooting threat, becoming the new "face of the franchise". The Bucks finished the season with a record of 41-41 and made the playoffs, and in the 2004 NBA Playoffs the Bucks faced off against the Detroit Pistons, losing in five games.

The Bucks received the first pick in the 2005 NBA draft, and used it to select center Andrew Bogut. In the offseason, the Bucks hired Terry Stotts as their new head coach. Stotts was under George Karl's coaching staff, and they signed former NBA Most Improved Player Bobby Simmons, and in October the Bucks traded Desmond Mason to the New Orleans Hornets in exchange for Jamaal Magloire. The Bucks Finished last place in Division and made the playoffs but they lost to the Detroit Pistons in first round in five games.

In the 2007 NBA Draft the Bucks selected Chinese basketball star Yi Jianlian with the sixth pick.

On April 11, 2008 the Bucks hired former Detroit Pistons vice-president of basketball operations John Hammond as their next general manager of the team.

On April 17 the Bucks fired Krystkowiak after a full season, four days later the Bucks hired former Chicago Bulls head coach Scott Skiles as their new head coach.

On June 26, 2008 the Bucks acquired Richard Jefferson from the New Jersey Nets in exchange for Yi and Simmons. Later that day, the Bucks selected West Virginia's Joe Alexander with the eighth pick in the 2008 NBA draft. Alexander was the first Taiwanese-born player in the NBA, and they selected UCLA's Luc Richard Mbah a Moute with the 37th pick in the 2008 draft. Mbah a Moute was the second Cameroonian player in the NBA. In the 2008-09 season, the Bucks struggled with injuries to two key players, Redd and Bogut, and finished with a record of 34-48.

== 2009–2013: The Brandon Jennings era and 'Fear the Deer' ==
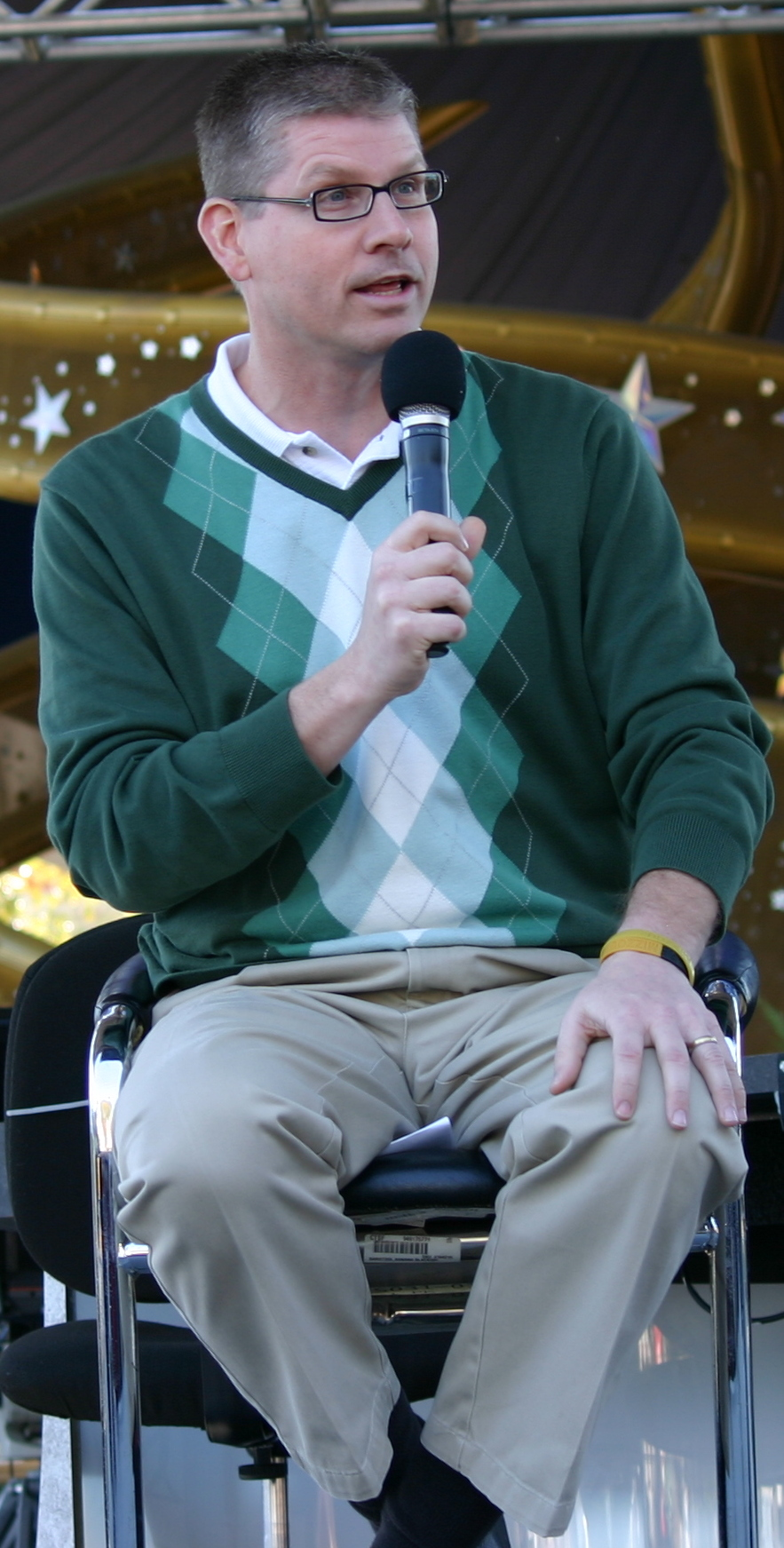
John Anderson, innovator of the "Fear the Deer" motto

In the 2009 NBA draft, the Milwaukee Bucks selected point guard Brandon Jennings, who had not gone to college but played in Italy the previous year. In the offseason, the Bucks made additions to the roster, such as Kurt Thomas, Carlos Delfino and Ersan İlyasova. The Bucks began the 2009–10 season with struggles with a record of 12-18 through December, then during the season, the Bucks signed Jerry Stackhouse, and in February the Bucks acquired John Salmons from the Chicago Bulls in exchange for Joe Alexander and Hakim Warrick, to replace the injured of Michael Redd. The Bucks quickly fell behind the Cleveland Cavaliers in the Central Division, but Milwaukee ultimately clinched a playoff berth on April 6, 2010, with a road win over the Chicago Bulls. It was during that time that the phrase "Fear the Deer" started, most likely by ESPN commentator John Anderson. It was quickly adopted on message boards and within Andrew Bogut's Squad 6. In the 2010 NBA Playoffs the Bucks lost to the Atlanta Hawks in seven games in the first round.

In offseason the Bucks acquired Corey Maggette from the Golden State Warriors, third year player Chris Douglas-Roberts from the New Jersey Nets and second year player Jon Brockman from the Sacramento Kings then in 2010 NBA Draft the Bucks selected Larry Sanders with the 15th pick and free agents Additions of Drew Gooden and Keyon Dooling. The Bucks Finished 2010-11 season with record of 35-47.

In offseason 2011 the Bucks acquired Stephen Jackson, Shaun Livingston, Beno Udrih and the Draft rights to Tobias Harris, signing Mike Dunleavy Jr. and they also drafted Jon Leuer. The Bucks began 2-1 in December. With Bogut sidelined for the rest of the season and Jackson and head coach Scott Skiles not seeing eye-to-eye, the Bucks decided to trade both players. On March 13, 2012, 48 hours before the trade deadline, the Bucks traded Bogut and Jackson to the Golden State Warriors in exchange for Monta Ellis, Ekpe Udoh, and Kwame Brown. The Bucks finished the season with a 31–35 record and in 9th place in the Eastern Conference, four games behind the Philadelphia 76ers, who claimed the last berth for the 2012 NBA Playoffs. The regular season was reduced from its usual 82 games to 66 due to the lockout.

In offseason the Bucks acquired Samuel Dalembert from Houston Rockets. In 2012 NBA Draft the Bucks selected John Henson with 14th pick.

== 2013–2026: The Giannis Antetokounmpo era ==
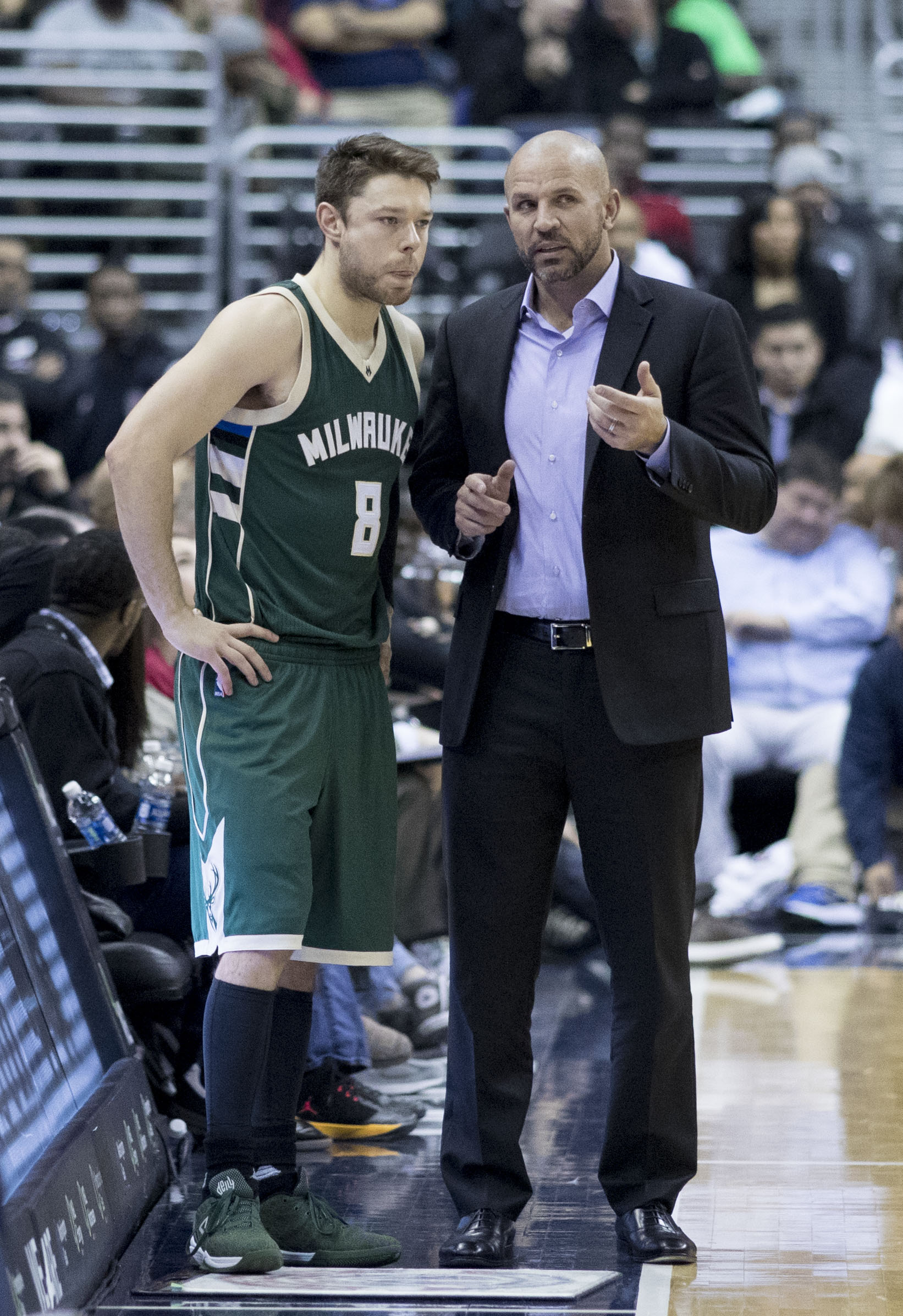
Jason Kidd with Matthew Dellavedova during his tenure as Bucks head coach

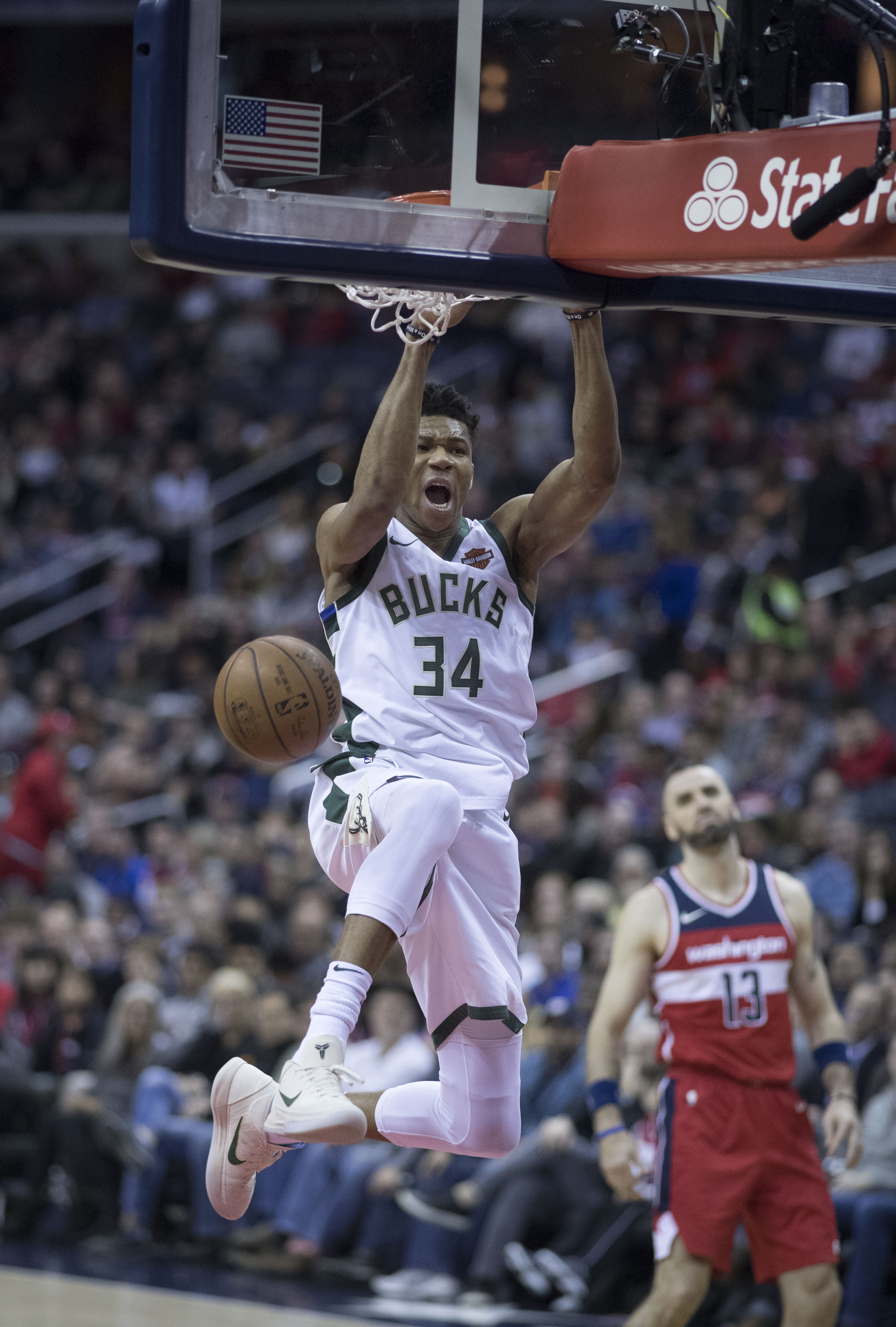
Giannis Antetokounmpo makes a dunk against the Washington Wizards

Jim Boylan was relieved of his coaching duties and ex-Atlanta Hawks coach Larry Drew was hired. On June 27, 2013, the Bucks chose Greek forward Giannis Antetokounmpo with the 15th overall pick of the 2013 NBA draft. They also brought in O. J. Mayo, Carlos Delfino, Zaza Pachulia, and Gary Neal as well as seeing Monta Ellis opt-out of the final year of his contract. The Bucks also agreed to sign-and-trade Brandon Jennings to the Detroit Pistons in exchange for Brandon Knight, Khris Middleton, and Viacheslav Kravtsov. The Bucks later extended their contract with Larry Sanders with a four-year, $44 million contract and traded Ish Smith and Kravtsov to the Phoenix Suns for Caron Butler. By the start of the 2013–14 season, the Bucks only had four players on their roster from the previous season. The season itself was a struggle, as the Bucks finished with the worst record in the league at 15–67, the worst record in team history.

On June 26, 2014, the Bucks received the second overall pick in 2014 NBA Draft and they chose Jabari Parker out of Duke University.

On July 1, 2014, the Bucks secured the coaching rights for Jason Kidd from the Brooklyn Nets in exchange for two second-round draft picks in the 2015 NBA draft and the 2019 NBA draft. in midseason the Bucks acquired Michael Carter-Williams, Tyler Ennis and Miles Plumlee from three-teams deal.

The Bucks finished the 2014–15 season with a 41–41 record. Their 26-game improvement from the previous season was the second-highest in franchise history. The Bucks made the 2015 NBA playoffs as the 6th seed in the Eastern Conference, where they faced the Chicago Bulls in the first round, losing in six games.

On July 6, 2015, Bucks president Peter Feigin stated if public funding for a new arena fell through, the NBA could have bought the team and moved it to Las Vegas or Seattle. Current Bucks owners Wes Edens, Marc Lasry and Jamie Dinan combined with Herb Kohl to pledge $250 million for a new arena and sought a match from the public. Of those funds, $93 million would come from the Wisconsin Center District in the form of new debt on Milwaukee citizens. The district would not commence repaying the bonds until 13 years thereafter.

On July 9, 2015, the Bucks confirmed their signing of center Greg Monroe to a three-year, $50 million contract. The Bucks also announced the club's re-signing of Khris Middleton to a five-year, $70 million contract.

On July 15, 2015, the future for the Bucks in Milwaukee was solidified after the Wisconsin State Senate voted 21–10 in favor of a proposal to use public money to help finance a replacement for the BMO Harris Bradley Center, which at the time was the third-oldest arena being used by an NBA team, behind Oracle Arena, and Madison Square Garden.

On the court, the young roster of the Bucks went through a step backward, to a 33–49 record in the 2015–16 season, though Giannis Antetokounmpo had an encouraging stretch in the final half of the season, accumulating 5 triple-doubles.

On June 18, 2016, ground was broken for the Bucks' new arena.

On September 19, 2016, the Bucks and Giannis Antetokounmpo agreed to a 4-year, $100 million contract extension. In addition, the team would add new young improvements to the roster in drafting Thon Maker and Malcolm Brogdon, and free agents of Matthew Dellavedova and Jason Terry, and made trades to bring in Tony Snell and Michael Beasley. When the 2016–17 season began, the Bucks were without Khris Middleton, who suffered a torn hamstring during a practice. Even so, the Bucks remained competitive, staying around .500 for the first half of the season, with both Antetokounmpo and Jabari Parker leading the offense. While Parker missed making the All-Star team, Antetokounmpo was voted in as a starter, becoming the first Bucks All-Star since Michael Redd in 2004. In January, the Bucks slumped, though fans anticipated a turnaround with Middleton's return on February 8 against the Miami Heat. In the same game, however, Parker tore his ACL for the second time in 3 seasons, ending his season. Even so, Middleton's return still sparked a turnaround in March. During the month, the Bucks went 14–4, putting the team back in the thick of the playoff race. On April 8, 2017, the Bucks beat the Philadelphia 76ers 90–82, clinching the Bucks a playoff spot. On April 10, the Bucks beat the Charlotte Hornets 89–79 to clinch only the third winning season for the Bucks since 2001. The team finished the 2016–17 regular season with a 42–40 record. Giannis Antetokounmpo made history, becoming only the 5th player in NBA history to lead his team in all five major statistical categories, and was the first in NBA history to finish in the top 20 in the league in each category. The Bucks were the #6 seed in the Eastern Conference playoffs, and lost in the opening round to the Toronto Raptors, 4–2. On June 16, 2017, the Bucks named Jon Horst as their new general manager.

Early in the 2017–18 season, the Bucks would acquire two-way guard Eric Bledsoe from the Phoenix Suns in exchange for Greg Monroe and two protected draft picks. On January 22, 2018, the Bucks fired Kidd after 23-22 record. In Kidd's three and a half seasons as head coach, the Bucks had a regular-season record of 139–152 and reached the first round of the NBA playoffs in the 2014–15 and 2016–17 seasons. The Bucks finished 44–38 for the 2018 season, before ultimately being eliminated in a hard-fought seven-game series against the Boston Celtics, a rival they would encounter in the playoffs two more times in 2019 and 2022.

On May 17, 2018, the Bucks hired former Atlanta Hawks head coach Mike Budenholzer as their new head coach. On August 26, 2018, the Bucks' new arena, Fiserv Forum, opened to the public. In offseason the Bucks drafted Villanova Guard Donte DiVincenzo with 17th pick and free agents Additions of Brook Lopez, Pat Connaughton and return of Ersan İlyasova. The Bucks opened the season with seven straight wins, the first time they started a season 7–0 since 1971–72. The Bucks made midseason acquisitions of George Hill from the Cleveland Cavaliers and Nikola Mirotić from the New Orleans Pelicans and veteran Pau Gasol who just played three games. On March 1, 2019, with a 131–120 victory over the Los Angeles Lakers, the Bucks became the first team to secure a playoff berth in the season. Later on, The Bucks clinched their first Division Championship since 2000-01. They then clinched the best record in the NBA with a win against the Philadelphia 76ers on April 4, 2019, achieving the feat for the first time since 1973–74. Eventually, the Bucks finished the regular season with a 60–22 record, the franchise's first 60-win season since 1980–81. The Bucks finished 33–8 at home, the second-best home record in the NBA, behind the Denver Nuggets, and their 27–14 road record was the best in the league, tied with the Golden State Warriors. The Bucks also won all 14 of their season series against Eastern Conference opponents, and lost back-to-back games just once, resulting in their longest losing streak for the season, at two games. The Bucks had the best team defensive rating in the NBA. During the breakout season, Antetokounmpo won his first MVP award, Middleton was selected as an All-star For the first time in his career, and both Antetokounmpo and Bledsoe were selected to the All-Defensive First Team. Malcolm Brogdon also notably has a 50/40/90 season. In the 2019 NBA Playoffs, the Bucks beat the Detroit Pistons in first round, the Bucks first playoff win series since 2001. Then the Bucks defeated the Boston Celtics in the Semifinals in five games, advancing to the Eastern Conference finals for the first time since 2001, where they faced the Toronto Raptors and lost to the eventual NBA Champion in six games, despite taking the first two games. Brogdon would eventually sign with the Indiana Pacers in free agency.

In the 2019–20 season, the Bucks got off to a historic 24–3 start. Antetokounmpo would win his second MVP award, as well as the Defensive Player of the Year award, Middleton would be selected an All-Star for the second time, and Bledsoe and Lopez would both make All-Defensive selections. Although the Bucks saw the possibility of a 70-win season, holding a 52–8 record in early March, the season was abruptly suspended due to mounting cases in the COVID-19 pandemic. When the season resumed in the 2020 NBA Bubble, the Bucks never completely got back to form, finishing 3–5 in the seeding games and finishing with a 56–17 record, but they nonetheless reclaimed the best record in the league. Despite handily defeating the Orlando Magic in the first round, their season came to an end at the hands of an up-and-coming Miami Heat, who shockingly upset them in five games en route to the 2020 NBA Finals. This would be the first of three playoff meetings between the two teams in the next four seasons.

=== 2020-2021: Second championship ===
During the 2020 offseason, the Bucks signed Giannis Antetokounmpo to a 5-year, $228 million contract extension, which was the most high-paying contract in NBA history. Along with resigning their franchise cornerstone, the Bucks also traded Eric Bledsoe and George Hill to the New Orleans Pelicans in exchange for a former All-Defense player in Jrue Holiday, which was a sound tactical move for the team. The Bucks also strengthened their bench by signing Bobby Portis and Bryn Forbes in free agency. In their 2020–21 season, the Bucks secured the third seed in the Eastern Conference with a record of 46–26 in the COVID-19 shortened season, as well as a third Central Division title in a row. It was the third consecutive season the Bucks had a winning percentage of at least .600. This was the first time that the Bucks achieved this feat since 1984–86, during their glory days. During the season, the Bucks acquired P. J. Tucker to further strengthen their defensive capabilities in preparation for the playoffs.

In the 2021 NBA playoffs, the Bucks began by defeating the Heat in a four-game sweep in a continuation of the rivalry formed in the year before's Eastern Conference Semifinals. They then overcame the Brooklyn Nets (led by Kevin Durant, Kyrie Irving and James Harden) in seven games in the Conference Semifinals, culminating with a Game 7 victory in front of a hostile crowd at the Barclays Center. They then defeated the Atlanta Hawks in six games in the Conference Finals to secure their 3rd NBA Finals appearance in franchise history and their first since 1974. In the NBA Finals, the Bucks faced the Phoenix Suns, who were favored after defeating the defending champion, the Los Angeles Lakers in the Western Conference first round. The Bucks came back from down 2-0 to win the NBA finals. Giannis Antetokounmpo was named Finals MVP after averaging 35.2 points, 13.2 rebounds, 5.0 assists, 1.2 steals, and 1.8 blocks in the series including a series-winning 50-point performance in a 105-98 Game 6 victory at the Fiserv Forum.

=== 2021-2026: Successful seasons and playoff disappointment ===
In 2021–22, the Bucks withstood the absence of starting center Lopez for most of the season. Despite this, they were able to finish with a record of 51–31, securing the third seed in the East, as Lopez was able to recover in time for the playoffs. Although they defeated the Chicago Bulls in five games in the first round, they would lose Middleton to a foot injury in the process, rendering him absent for the remainder of the postseason. This absence would prove costly as the Bucks' title defense ended in seven games against the Boston Celtics, a rival they have encountered in the postseason for the third time in five seasons.

The Bucks kept most of their roster intact for the 2023 season. Despite the absence of Middleton for the majority of the regular season, they would once again clinch the best record in the league at 58–24, winning the inaugural Maurice Podoloff Trophy. Antetokounmpo averaged a career-high 31.1 points, and he and Holiday would make the All-Star team. Holiday and Lopez were also rewarded All-Defensive selections. Despite the successful regular season, the Bucks, in a repeat of their 2020 season, came up short once more against the Miami Heat, who upset them again in five games en route to the 2023 NBA Finals.

In the 2023 offseason, the Bucks hired Adrian Griffin to replace Mike Budenholzer. On September 27, 2023, the Bucks acquired seven-time all-star point guard Damian Lillard in a 3-team trade with the Portland Trail Blazers and the Boston Celtics, sending away Jrue Holiday. This addition in the side propelled the team to a 49-33 record in the 2023-24 season. On January 23, 2024, the Bucks fired their head coach, Adrian Griffin, and replaced him with Doc Rivers, despite Griffin guiding the team to a 30-13 record at the start of the season. The Bucks finished as the 3rd seed, behind the Boston Celtics and the New York Knicks. In the first round of the playoffs, the Bucks lost to the Indiana Pacers in six games.

The Bucks started 2024-25 season with a rather disappointing 2–8 start to their season before winning 8 of 9 games to reach a 10–9 record near the end of November, including a six-game winning streak near the end of that month. The Bucks held a perfect record in the NBA Cup, winning the Cup on December 17 by defeating the Oklahoma City Thunder. At the 2024-25 trade deadline, the Bucks decided to re-tool their roster by trading three-time All-Star and Bucks legend Khris Middleton to the Washington Wizards in exchange for Kyle Kuzma.Later in the season, the Bucks would be eliminated in the first round for the third straight season.

In offseason the Bucks signed Myles Turner from defending Eastern Conference champions Indiana Pacers as well they waived Damian Lillard after torn Achilles injury and Lopez will joined Los Angeles Clippers as well they traded away Pat Connaughton to Charlotte Hornets. The Bucks began 2025-26 season on a promising 5-2 start, but suffered a 7-game losing streak in November following a groin strain suffered by Giannis Antetokounmpo. After 3 games in his return, Antetokounmpo suffered a calf strain in a game against the Detroit Pistons and would be ruled out indefinitely. With a blowout loss to the San Antonio Spurs on March 28, the Bucks were eliminated from the playoffs for the first time since 2015-16 season. On April 12th 2026 after the day lost against the Philadelphia 76ers the Bucks fired Doc Rivers after three seasons with the team.

== 2026–present: Post-Giannis and arrival of Tyler Herro ==
On April 30, 2026, the Bucks hired former Memphis Grizzlies Head coach Taylor Jenkins as their new head coach, Jenkins was under Mike Budenholzer coaching staff from 2018-19 season. On June 23 2026 the Bucks trading Giannis Antetokounmpo and Bobby Portis to the Miami Heat exchange for Tyler Herro, Jaime Jaquez Jr., Kel'el Ware and Kasparas Jakučionis. Later that day, the Bucks selected Brayden Burries with ten pick and Nate Ament with Thirteenth pick in 2026 NBA Draft.
