= 1989–90 Texas Longhorns men's basketball team =

American college basketball season

1989–90 Texas Longhorns men's basketball

NCAA tournament, Elite Eight
- Conference: Southwest Conference
- Record: 24–9 (12–4 SWC)
- Head coach: Tom Penders (2nd season)
- Home arena: Frank Erwin Center

1989–90 Southwest Conference men's basketball standings
	Conf.				Overall
Team	W		L	PCT	W		L	PCT
No. 7 Arkansas †	14	–	2	.875	30	–	5	.857
Houston	13	–	3	.813	25	–	8	.758
Texas	12	–	4	.750	24	–	9	.727
TCU	9	–	7	.563	16	–	13	.552
Baylor	7	–	9	.438	16	–	14	.533
Texas A&M	7	–	9	.438	14	–	17	.452
Rice	5	–	11	.313	11	–	17	.393
SMU	5	–	11	.313	10	–	18	.357
Texas Tech	0	–	16	.000	5	–	22	.185
† 1990 SWC tournament winner Rankings from AP Poll

The 1989–90 Texas Longhorns men's basketball team represented The University of Texas at Austin in intercollegiate basketball competition during the 1989–90 season. The Longhorns were led by second-year head coach Tom Penders. The team finished the season with a 24–9 overall record and finished third in Southwest Conference play with a 12–4 conference record. Texas advanced to the NCAA tournament in consecutive seasons for the first time in school history, recording its fourth overall Elite Eight appearance and its first in 43 years.

== Schedule and results ==
Date time, TV	Rank^{#}	Opponent^{#}	Result	Record	Site (attendance) city, state
Regular season
Tues., Nov. 28, 1989*		UT-Arlington	W 116–66	1–0	Frank Erwin Center; Austin, Texas
Fri., Dec. 8, 1989*		Manhattan; 6th Longhorn Classic	W 108–63	2–0	Frank Erwin Center; Austin, Texas
Sat., Dec. 9, 1989*		UT-San Antonio; 6th Longhorn Classic	W 89–86	3–0	Frank Erwin Center; Austin, Texas
Thu., Dec. 14, 1989*		Long Beach State	L 87–89	3–1	Frank Erwin Center; Austin, Texas
Sat., Dec. 16, 1989*		No. 24 Florida	W 105–94	4–1	Frank Erwin Center; Austin, Texas
Thu., Dec. 21, 1989*		VMI	W 98–74	5–1	Frank Erwin Center; Austin, Texas
Sat., Dec. 23, 1989		at SMU	W 73–67	6–1 (1–0)	Moody Coliseum; University Park, Texas
Sat., Dec. 30, 1989*		at Stetson	W 102–82	7–1	Edmunds Center; DeLand, Florida
Tue., Jan. 2, 1990*		vs. No. 11 LSU	L 113–124	7–2	The Summit; Houston, Texas
Thu., Jan. 4, 1990		Texas Tech	W 109–71	8–2 (2–0)	Frank Erwin Center; Austin, Texas
Sat., Jan. 6, 1990		Baylor	W 108–89	9–2 (3–0)	Frank Erwin Center; Austin, Texas
Wed., Jan. 10, 1990		at TCU	W 83–80	10–2 (4–0)	Daniel–Meyer Coliseum; Fort Worth, Texas
Sat., Jan. 13, 1990		at No. 4 Oklahoma	L 84–103	10–3	Lloyd Noble Center; Norman, Oklahoma
Wed., Jan. 17, 1990		Texas A&M	W 96–94	11–3 (5–0)	Frank Erwin Center; Austin, Texas
Sat., Jan. 20, 1990*		Rhode Island	W 107–86	12–3	Frank Erwin Center; Austin, Texas
Mon., Jan. 22, 1990		at Texas Tech	W 97–77	13–3 (6–0)	Lubbock Municipal Coliseum; Lubbock, Texas
Thu., Jan. 25, 1990		at No. 6 Arkansas	L 100–109	13–4 (6–1)	Barnhill Arena; Fayetteville, Arkansas
Sat., Jan. 27, 1990		Rice	W 96–84	14–4 (7–1)	Frank Erwin Center; Austin, Texas
Tue., Jan. 30, 1990		Houston	L 93–102	14–5 (7–2)	Frank Erwin Center; Austin, Texas
Sun., Feb. 4, 1990		No. 3 Arkansas	L 96–103 ^{OT}	14–6 (7–3)	Frank Erwin Center; Austin, Texas
Wed., Feb. 7, 1990		at Baylor	W 96–91	15–6 (8–3)	Ferrell Center; Waco, Texas
Sun., Feb. 11, 1990		TCU	W 85–77	16–6 (9–3)	Frank Erwin Center; Austin, Texas
Wed., Feb. 14, 1990		SMU	W 79–68	17–6 (10–3)	Frank Erwin Center; Austin, Texas
Sun., Feb. 18, 1990		at Texas A&M	W 79–73	18–6 (11–3)	G. Rollie White Coliseum; College Station, Texas
Wed., Feb. 28, 1990		at Rice	W 86–84	19–6 (12–3)	Rice Gymnasium; Houston, Texas
Sat., Mar. 3, 1990*		at DePaul	W 89–79	20–6 (12–3)	Rosemont Horizon; Rosemont, Illinois
Mon., Mar. 5, 1990		at Houston	L 79–84	20–7 (12–4)	Hofheinz Pavilion; Houston, Texas
1990 Southwest Conference tournament
Fri., Mar. 9, 1990	(3)	vs. (6) Texas A&M; Quarterfinals	W 92–84	21–7	Reunion Arena; Dallas, Texas
Fri., Mar. 9, 1990	(3)	vs. (2) Houston; Semifinals	L 86–89	21–8	Reunion Arena; Dallas, Texas
1990 NCAA tournament
Fri., Mar. 16, 1990	(10 MW)	vs. (7 MW) Georgia; First Round	W 100–88	22–8	RCA Dome; Indianapolis
Sun., Mar. 18, 1990	(10 MW)	vs. (2 MW) No. 10 Purdue; Second Round	W 73–72	23–8	Hoosier Dome; Indianapolis
Thu., Mar. 22, 1990	(10 MW)	vs. (6 MW) No. 25 Xavier; Sweet Sixteen	W 102–89	24–8	Reunion Arena; Dallas
Sat., Mar. 24, 1990	(10 MW)	vs. (4 MW) No. 7 Arkansas; NCAA Midwest Regional Final (Elite Eight)	L 85–88	24–9	Reunion Arena; Dallas
*Non-conference game. ^{#}Rankings from AP poll. (#) Tournament seedings in parentheses. All times are in Central Standard Time.

== NBA draft ==
Round	Pick	Player	NBA club
1	14	Travis Mays	Sacramento Kings
1	26	Lance Blanks	Detroit Pistons
