= 1989–90 Arkansas Razorbacks men's basketball team =

American college basketball season

1989–90 Arkansas Razorbacks men's basketball

NCAA Tournament Midwest Regional champions SWC tournament champions SWC regular season champions

NCAA tournament, Final Four
- Conference: Southwest Conference

Ranking
- Coaches: No. 8
- AP: No. 7
- Record: 30–5 (14–2 SWC)
- Head coach: Nolan Richardson
- Assistant coach: Scott Edgar
- Home arena: Barnhill Arena

1989–90 Southwest Conference men's basketball standings
	Conf.				Overall
Team	W		L	PCT	W		L	PCT
No. 7 Arkansas †	14	–	2	.875	30	–	5	.857
Houston	13	–	3	.813	25	–	8	.758
Texas	12	–	4	.750	24	–	9	.727
TCU	9	–	7	.563	16	–	13	.552
Baylor	7	–	9	.438	16	–	14	.533
Texas A&M	7	–	9	.438	14	–	17	.452
Rice	5	–	11	.313	11	–	17	.393
SMU	5	–	11	.313	10	–	18	.357
Texas Tech	0	–	16	.000	5	–	22	.185
† 1990 SWC tournament winner Rankings from AP Poll

The 1989–90 Arkansas Razorbacks men's basketball team represented the University of Arkansas in the 1989–90 college basketball season. The head coach was Nolan Richardson, serving for his fifth year. The team played its home games in Barnhill Arena in Fayetteville, Arkansas. This team won the second of three straight SWC regular season and conference tournament championships. The 1990 Hogs defeated Princeton, Dayton, North Carolina, and SWC rival Texas to make it to the Final Four of the NCAA tournament, before losing to the Duke Blue Devils.

== Roster ==
1989–90 Arkansas Razorbacks men's basketball team
Players
Coaches

Pos.	#	Name	Height	Weight	Year	Hometown
G/F	3	Warren Linn	6 ft 5 in (1.96 m)	185 lb (84 kg)	Fr	Tulsa, Oklahoma
G	10	Todd Day	6 ft 6 in (1.98 m)	188 lb (85 kg)	So	Memphis, Tennessee
G	11	Lee Mayberry	6 ft 1 in (1.85 m)	172 lb (78 kg)	So	Tulsa, Oklahoma
G	14	Ernie Murry	6 ft 1 in (1.85 m)	174 lb (79 kg)	Jr	Wabbaseka, Arkansas
G	20	Arlyn Bowers	5 ft 10 in (1.78 m)	165 lb (75 kg)	Jr	Memphis, Tennessee
G/F	21	Darrell Hawkins	6 ft 5 in (1.96 m)	200 lb (91 kg)	So	Prairie View, Texas
G	22	Cannon Whitby	6 ft 0 in (1.83 m)	165 lb (75 kg)	Sr	Troy, Tennessee
F	23	Michael Hogue	6 ft 8 in (2.03 m)	220 lb (100 kg)	Fr	Tulsa, Oklahoma
F	24	Lenzie Howell	6 ft 5 in (1.96 m)	165 lb (75 kg)	Sr	Dallas, Texas
C	25	Oliver Miller	6 ft 9 in (2.06 m)	280 lb (127 kg)	So	Fort Worth, Texas
F	31	Ron Huery	6 ft 7 in (2.01 m)	201 lb (91 kg)	RS Jr	Memphis, Tennessee
F	33	Clyde Fletcher	6 ft 7 in (2.01 m)	209 lb (95 kg)	Jr	Memphis, Tennessee
F	42	Larry Marks	6 ft 7 in (2.01 m)	235 lb (107 kg)	Jr	Columbia, Tennessee
C	44	Shawn Davis	6 ft 9 in (2.06 m)	215 lb (98 kg)	RS So	Maud, Texas
C	55	Mario Credit	6 ft 9 in (2.06 m)	240 lb (109 kg)	Sr	Kansas City, Kansas

Head coach

- Nolan Richardson (UTEP)

Assistant coach(es)

Legend

- (C) Team captain
- (S) Suspended
- (I) Ineligible
- (W) Walk-on
- Injured
- Current redshirt

== Schedule and results ==
Date time, TV	Rank^{#}	Opponent^{#}	Result	Record	Site city, state
Non-conference season
November 24, 1989*; KATV	No. 9	Samford	W 97–67	1–0	Barnhill Arena; Fayetteville, AR
November 26, 1989*	No. 9	Oregon	W 102–75	2–0	Barnhill Arena; Fayetteville, AR
November 29, 1989*; ESPN	No. 11	at South Alabama	W 105–90	3–0	Mitchell Center; Mobile, AL
December 5, 1989*; KATV	No. 10	Ole Miss	W 90–76	4–0	Barnhill Arena; Fayetteville, AR
December 9, 1989*; KATV	No. 10	Alliant International	W 166–101	5–0	Barnhill Arena; Fayetteville, AR
December 12, 1989*; ESPN	No. 7	No. 4 Missouri	L 88–89	5–1	Barnhill Arena; Fayetteville, AR
December 18, 1989*	No. 7	Bethune–Cookman	W 91–61	6–1	Barnhill Arena; Fayetteville, AR
December 23, 1989*	No. 10	VMI	W 92–61	7–1	Barnhill Arena; Fayetteville, AR
December 26, 1989*; KATV	No. 11	Delaware State	W 117–75	8–1	Barnhill Arena; Fayetteville, AR
December 30, 1989*; CBS	No. 11	at No. 12 UNLV	L 93–101	8–2	Thomas & Mack Center; Paradise, NV
Regular season
January 3, 1990	No. 14	at Houston	W 82–78	9–2 (1–0)	Hofheinz Pavilion; Houston, TX
January 6, 1990; Raycom	No. 14	at Texas Tech	W 92–75	10–2 (2–0)	Lubbock Municipal Coliseum; Lubbock, TX
January 10, 1990	No. 12	Baylor	W 99–84	11–2 (3–0)	Barnhill Arena; Fayetteville, AR
January 13, 1990; KATV	No. 12	TCU	W 93–79	12–2 (4–0)	Barnhill Arena; Fayetteville, AR
January 17, 1990	No. 12	at SMU	W 80–61	13–2 (5–0)	Moody Coliseum; University Park, TX
January 20, 1990; Raycom	No. 12	at Texas A&M	W 100–84	14–2 (6–0)	G. Rollie White Coliseum; College Station, TX
January 22, 1990; KATV	No. 6	Houston	W 100–89	15–2 (7–0)	Barnhill Arena; Fayetteville, AR
January 25, 1990; ESPN	No. 6	Texas	W 109–100	16–2 (8–0)	Barnhill Arena; Fayetteville, AR
January 27, 1990*; KATV	No. 6	at UAB	W 109–95	17–2	UAB Arena; Birmingham, AL
January 31, 1990; HSE	No. 3	at Rice	W 70–66	18–2 (9–0)	Tudor Fieldhouse; Houston, TX
February 4, 1990; ABC	No. 3	at Texas	W 103–96 ^{OT}	19–2 (10–0)	Frank Erwin Center; Austin, TX
February 7, 1990; KATV	No. 3	Texas Tech	W 100–77	20–2 (11–0)	Barnhill Arena; Fayetteville, AR
February 10, 1990; Raycom	No. 3	at Baylor	L 77–82	20–3 (11–1)	Ferrell Center; Waco, TX
February 14, 1990; KATV	No. 8	at TCU	L 79–81	20–4 (11–2)	Daniel-Meyer Coliseum; Fort Worth, TX
February 17, 1990; Raycom	No. 8	SMU	W 77–46	21–4 (12–2)	Barnhill Arena; Fayetteville, AR
February 17, 1990; KATV	No. 13	Texas A&M	W 114–100	22–4 (13–2)	Barnhill Arena; Fayetteville, AR
February 17, 1990	No. 12	Rice	W 104–80	23–4 (14–2)	Barnhill Arena; Fayetteville, AR
SWC Tournament
March 9, 1990*	No. 9	vs. SMU; SWC Tournament Quarterfinal	W 84–61	24–4	Reunion Arena; Dallas, TX
March 10, 1990*	No. 9	vs. Baylor; SWC Tournament Semifinal	W 115–75	25–4	Reunion Arena; Dallas, TX
March 11, 1990*	No. 9	vs. Houston; SWC tournament championship	W 96–84	26–4	Reunion Arena; Dallas, TX
NCAA Tournament
March 15, 1990*; NCAA	No. 7	vs. Princeton	W 68–64	27–4	Frank Erwin Center; Austin, TX
March 17, 1990*; CBS	No. 7	vs. Dayton	W 86–84	28–4	Frank Erwin Center; Austin, TX
March 22, 1990*; CBS	No. 7	vs. North Carolina; Midwest Regional semifinal	W 96–73	29–4	Reunion Arena; Dallas, TX
March 24, 1990*; CBS	No. 7	vs. Texas; Midwest Regional Final	W 88–85	30–4	Reunion Arena; Dallas, TX
March 31, 1990*; CBS	No. 7	vs. No. 15 Duke; National semifinal	L 83–97	30–5	McNichols Sports Arena; Denver, CO
*Non-conference game. ^{#}Rankings from AP Poll. (#) Tournament seedings in parentheses.

== Awards and honors ==
- Nolan Richardson – SWC Coach of the Year
