= 1990 Southwest Conference men's basketball tournament =

- Classification: Division I
- Season: 1989–90
- Teams: 8
- Site: Reunion Arena; Dallas, Texas
- Champions: Arkansas (5th title)
- Winning coach: Nolan Richardson (2nd title)
- MVP: Todd Day (Arkansas)

1989–90 Southwest Conference men's basketball standings
	Conf.				Overall
Team	W		L	PCT	W		L	PCT
No. 7 Arkansas †	14	–	2	.875	30	–	5	.857
Houston	13	–	3	.813	25	–	8	.758
Texas	12	–	4	.750	24	–	9	.727
TCU	9	–	7	.563	16	–	13	.552
Baylor	7	–	9	.438	16	–	14	.533
Texas A&M	7	–	9	.438	14	–	17	.452
Rice	5	–	11	.313	11	–	17	.393
SMU	5	–	11	.313	10	–	18	.357
Texas Tech	0	–	16	.000	5	–	22	.185
† 1990 SWC tournament winner Rankings from AP Poll

The 1990 Southwest Conference men's basketball tournament was held March 10–0, 1990, at Reunion Arena in Dallas, Texas.

Number 1 seed Arkansas defeated 2 seed Houston 96-84 to win their 5th championship and receive the conference's automatic bid to the 1990 NCAA tournament.

== Format and seeding ==
The tournament consisted of the top 8 teams playing in a single-elimination tournament.

Place	Seed	Team	Conference			Overall		
Place	Seed	Team	W	L	%	W	L	%
1	1	Arkansas	14	2	.875	30	5	.857
2	2	Houston	13	3	.813	25	8	.758
3	3	Texas	12	4	.750	24	9	.727
4	4	TCU	9	7	.563	16	13	.552
5	5	Baylor	7	9	.438	16	14	.533
5	6	Texas A&M	7	9	.438	14	17	.452
7	7	Rice	5	11	.313	11	17	.393
7	8	SMU	5	11	.313	10	18	.357
9	-	Texas Tech	0	16	.000	5	22	.185

== Tournament ==
Quarterfinals; Friday, March 9
1	#9 Arkansas	84
8	SMU	51
4	TCU	62
5	Baylor	72
3	Texas	92
6	Texas A&M	84
2	Houston	90
7	Rice	81

Semifinals; Saturday, March 10
1	#9 Arkansas	115
5	Baylor	75
3	Texas	86
2	Houston	89

Finals; Sunday, March 11
1	#9 Arkansas	96
2	Houston	84
