= 1988–89 Arkansas Razorbacks men's basketball team =

American college basketball season

1988–89 Arkansas Razorbacks men's basketball

SWC tournament champions SWC regular season champions

NCAA tournament, Round of 32
- Conference: Southwest Conference

Ranking
- Coaches: No. 17
- Record: 25–7 (13–3 SWC)
- Head coach: Nolan Richardson (4th season)
- Assistant coaches: Mike Anderson; Scott Edgar
- Home arena: Barnhill Arena

1988–89 Southwest Conference men's basketball standings
	Conf.				Overall
Team	W		L	PCT	W		L	PCT
Arkansas †	13	–	3	.813	25	–	7	.781
Texas	12	–	4	.750	25	–	9	.735
TCU	9	–	7	.563	17	–	13	.567
Houston	8	–	8	.500	17	–	14	.548
Texas A&M	8	–	8	.500	16	–	14	.533
Texas Tech	8	–	8	.500	13	–	15	.464
SMU	7	–	9	.438	13	–	16	.448
Rice	6	–	10	.375	12	–	16	.429
Baylor	1	–	15	.063	5	–	22	.185
† 1989 SWC tournament winner Rankings from AP Poll

The 1988–89 Arkansas Razorbacks men's basketball team represented the University of Arkansas as a member of the Southwest Conference during the 1988–89 college basketball season. The team was led by fourth-year head coach Nolan Richardson, and played its home games in Barnhill Arena in Fayetteville, Arkansas. The Razorbacks team won the first of three straight SWC regular season and conference tournament championships before moving to the Southeastern Conference for the 1991–92 season. After earning the conference's automatic bid to the NCAA tournament, Arkansas defeated Loyola Marymount in the opening round before losing to Louisville in the second round.

== Roster ==
The team's core was anchored by Oliver Miller and 1988 McDonald's All-Americans Todd Day and Lee Mayberry.

1988–89 Arkansas Razorbacks men's basketball team
Players
Coaches

Pos.	#	Name	Height	Weight	Year	Hometown
G	10	Todd Day	6 ft 8 in (2.03 m)	185 lb (84 kg)	Fr	Memphis, Tennessee
G	11	Lee Mayberry	6 ft 1 in (1.85 m)	170 lb (77 kg)	Fr	Tulsa, Oklahoma
G	12	Keith Wilson	6 ft 3 in (1.91 m)	170 lb (77 kg)	Sr	Fort Smith, Arkansas
G	22	Cannon Whitby	6 ft 0 in (1.83 m)	165 lb (75 kg)	Jr	Troy, Tennessee
G/F	24	Lenzie Howell	6 ft 4 in (1.93 m)	200 lb (91 kg)	Jr	Dallas, Texas
C	25	Oliver Miller	6 ft 9 in (2.06 m)	270 lb (122 kg)	Fr	Fort Worth, Texas
C	55	Mario Credit	6 ft 9 in (2.06 m)	240 lb (109 kg)	Jr	Kansas City, Kansas

Head coach

- Nolan Richardson (UTEP)

Assistant coach(es)

Legend

- (C) Team captain
- (S) Suspended
- (I) Ineligible
- (W) Walk-on
- Injured
- Current redshirt

== Schedule and results ==
Date time, TV	Rank^{#}	Opponent^{#}	Result	Record	Site city, state
Exhibition
Nov 19, 1988*		Yugoslavia	W 116–86		Barton Coliseum; Little Rock, AR
Nov 23, 1988*		Arkansas Express	W 109–85		Barnhill Arena; Fayetteville, AR
Regular season
Nov 27, 1988*		Rider	W 98–69	1–0	Barnhill Arena (8,162); Fayetteville, AR
Nov 30, 1988*		at Virginia	L 65–75	1–1	University Hall (8,864); Charlottesville, VA
Dec 10, 1988*		Maryland	W 73–68	2–1	Barnhill Arena (9,388); Fayetteville, AR
Dec 13, 1988*		vs. Ole Miss	W 74–68	3–1	Mid-South Coliseum (7,034); Memphis, TN
Dec 21, 1988*		Texas Southern	W 97–79	4–1	Barton Coliseum (6,816); Little Rock, AR
Dec 23, 1988*		Sam Houston State	W 97–79	5–1	Barton Coliseum (6,680); Little Rock, AR
Dec 28, 1988*		at No. 11 Missouri	L 78–83	5–2	Hearnes Center (13,454); Columbia, MO
Jan 2, 1989*		South Alabama	W 103–71	6–2	Pine Bluff Convention Center (5,260); Pine Bluff, AR
Jan 4, 1989		Texas Tech	W 69–62	7–2 (1–0)	Barnhill Arena (9,062); Fayetteville, AR
Jan 7, 1989		at Texas	W 99–92	8–2 (2–0)	Frank Erwin Center (12,647); Austin, TX
Jan 11, 1989		at TCU	L 45–51	8–3 (2–1)	Daniel-Meyer Coliseum (7,086); Fort Worth, TX
Jan 14, 1989		SMU	W 93–73	9–3 (3–1)	Barnhill Arena (9,286); Fayetteville, AR
Jan 16, 1989		Texas A&M	W 75–60	10–3 (4–1)	Barnhill Arena (9,318); Fayetteville, AR
Jan 18, 1989*		No. 14 Florida State	L 105–112 ^{OT}	10–4	Barton Coliseum (7,980); Little Rock, AR
Jan 21, 1989		at Baylor	W 88–58	11–4 (5–1)	Ferrell Center (7,549); Waco, TX
Jan 24, 1989*		Southern Utah	W 109–76	12–4	Pine Bluff Convention Center (6,744); Pine Bluff, AR
Jan 28, 1989		Rice	W 81–77	13–4 (6–1)	Barnhill Arena (9,302); Fayetteville, AR
Feb 1, 1989		at Houston	W 88–87	14–4 (7–1)	Hofheinz Pavilion (4,391); Houston, TX
Feb 4, 1989		at Texas Tech	L 73–84	14–5 (7–2)	Lubbock Municipal Coliseum (8,174); Lubbock, TX
Feb 8, 1989		Texas	W 105–82	15–5 (8–2)	Barnhill Arena (9,388); Fayetteville, AR
Feb 11, 1989		TCU	W 100–60	16–5 (9–2)	Barnhill Arena (9,364); Fayetteville, AR
Feb 15, 1989		at SMU	W 81–68	17–5 (10–2)	Moody Coliseum (5,691); Dallas, TX
Feb 18, 1989		at Texas A&M	L 71–82	17–6 (10–3)	G. Rollie White Coliseum (3,583); College Station, TX
Feb 22, 1989		Baylor	W 89–54	18–6 (11–3)	Barnhill Arena (9,092); Fayetteville, AR
Feb 25, 1989*		Tulsa	W 118–69	19–6	Barnhill Arena; Fayetteville, AR
Mar 1, 1989		at Rice	W 83–70	20–6 (12–3)	Tudor Fieldhouse (2,553); Houston, TX
Mar 6, 1989		Houston	W 107–79	21–6 (13–3)	Barnhill Arena (8,418); Fayetteville, AR
SWC Tournament
Mar 10, 1989*		vs. Rice; SWC Tournament Quarterfinal	W 108–72	22–6	Reunion Arena (15,758); Dallas, TX
Mar 11, 1989*		vs. Texas A&M; SWC Tournament Semifinal	W 94–84	23–6	Reunion Arena (16,240); Dallas, TX
Mar 12, 1989*		vs. Texas; SWC Tournament Championship	W 100–76	24–6	Reunion Arena (16,240); Dallas, TX
NCAA Tournament
Mar 16, 1989*; CBS	(5 MW)	vs. (12 MW) Loyola Marymount; Midwest Regional First Round	W 120–101	25–6	Hoosier Dome (37,232); Indianapolis, IN
Mar 18, 1989*; CBS	(5 MW)	vs. (4 MW) No. 12 Louisville; Midwest Regional Second Round	L 84–93	25–7	Hoosier Dome (37,444); Indianapolis, IN
*Non-conference game. ^{#}Rankings from AP Poll. (#) Tournament seedings in parentheses.

== Awards and honors ==
- Nolan Richardson – SWC Coach of the Year
