= 1989 Southwest Conference men's basketball tournament =

- Classification: Division I
- Season: 1988–89
- Teams: 8
- Site: Reunion Arena; Dallas, Texas
- Champions: Arkansas (4th title)
- Winning coach: Nolan Richardson (1st title)
- MVP: Lenzie Howell (Arkansas)

1988–89 Southwest Conference men's basketball standings
	Conf.				Overall
Team	W		L	PCT	W		L	PCT
Arkansas †	13	–	3	.813	25	–	7	.781
Texas	12	–	4	.750	25	–	9	.735
TCU	9	–	7	.563	17	–	13	.567
Houston	8	–	8	.500	17	–	14	.548
Texas A&M	8	–	8	.500	16	–	14	.533
Texas Tech	8	–	8	.500	13	–	15	.464
SMU	7	–	9	.438	13	–	16	.448
Rice	6	–	10	.375	12	–	16	.429
Baylor	1	–	15	.063	5	–	22	.185
† 1989 SWC tournament winner Rankings from AP Poll

The 1989 Southwest Conference men's basketball tournament was held March 10–12, 1989, at Reunion Arena in Dallas, Texas.

Number 1 seed Arkansas defeated 2 seed Texas 100-76 to win their 4th championship and receive the conference's automatic bid to the 1989 NCAA tournament.

== Format and seeding ==
The tournament consisted of the top 8 teams playing in a single-elimination tournament.

Place	Seed	Team	Conference			Overall		
Place	Seed	Team	W	L	%	W	L	%
1	1	Arkansas	13	3	.813	25	7	.781
2	2	Texas	12	4	.750	25	9	.735
3	3	TCU	9	7	.563	17	13	.567
4	4	Houston	8	8	.500	17	14	.548
4	5	Texas A&M	8	8	.500	16	14	.533
4	6	Texas Tech	8	8	.500	13	15	.464
7	7	SMU	7	9	.438	13	16	.448
8	8	Rice	6	10	.375	12	16	.429
9	-	Baylor	1	15	.063	5	22	.185

== Tournament ==
Quarterfinals; Friday, March 10
1	Arkansas	108
8	Rice	72
4	Houston	70
5	Texas A&M	82
3	TCU	84
6	Texas Tech	66
2	Texas	93
7	SMU	91^{OT}

Semifinals; Saturday, March 11
1	Arkansas	94
5	Texas A&M	84
3	TCU	89^{OT}
2	Texas	93

Finals; Sunday, March 12
1	Arkansas	100
2	Texas	76
