= Lee Mayberry =

American basketball player (born 1970)

Personal information
- Born: June 12, 1970 (age 56) Tulsa, Oklahoma, U.S.
- Listed height: 6 ft 1 in (1.85 m)
- Listed weight: 172 lb (78 kg)

Career information
- High school: Will Rogers (Tulsa, Oklahoma)
- College: Arkansas (1988–1992)
- NBA draft: 1992: 1st round, 23rd overall pick
- Drafted by: Milwaukee Bucks
- Playing career: 1992–1999
- Position: Point guard
- Number: 11

Career history
- 1992–1996: Milwaukee Bucks
- 1996–1999: Vancouver Grizzlies

Career highlights
- Third-team All-American – AP, NABC (1992); 2× First-team All-SWC (1990, 1991); First-team All-SEC (1992); McDonald's All-American (1988); 2× Fourth-team Parade All-American (1988, 1989)

Career NBA statistics
- Points: 2,546 (5.1 ppg)
- Rebounds: 642 (1.3 rpg)
- Assists: 1,767 (3.6 apg)
- Stats at NBA.com
- Stats at Basketball Reference
Medals
Men's basketball
Representing United States
FIBA World Championship
Bronze medal – third place	1990 Argentina	National team
Goodwill Games
Silver medal – second place	1990 Seattle	National team

Orva Lee Mayberry Jr. (born June 12, 1970) is an American former professional basketball player who spent seven seasons in the National Basketball Association (NBA) for the Milwaukee Bucks and Vancouver Grizzlies. He played college basketball for the Arkansas Razorbacks.

== Early career ==
Mayberry played high school basketball at Will Rogers High School in Tulsa, where he led them to a state championship in 1988. Mayberry was named to the 1988 McDonald's All-American team.

Mayberry played collegiately at the University of Arkansas and scored 1,940 points for the Razorbacks. Mayberry was a teammate of Todd Day and Oliver Miller, who also had lengthy NBA careers, and helped lead Arkansas to the 1990 Final Four in Denver, Colorado, where they lost in the national semifinals to Duke.

In his four years with the Razorbacks, Mayberry helped Arkansas win a conference title every year, to include three consecutive Southwest Conference (SWC) regular season championships and three consecutive SWC Tournament championships from 1989 to 1991. Arkansas moved from the SWC to the Southeastern Conference (SEC) in 1992, and Mayberry led the Hogs to the SEC Western Division championship and the SEC overall regular season championship in their first year in the conference. In addition to the 1990 Final Four, Mayberry helped Arkansas to the second round of the NCAA Tournament in 1989 and 1992, plus the Elite Eight in 1991. He is considered one of the greatest point guards to ever play for the Razorbacks.

== Professional career ==
Mayberry was selected by the Milwaukee Bucks in the 1st round (23rd overall) of the 1992 NBA draft, where Arkansas teammate Todd Day would also be drafted. Mayberry played from 1992 to 1996 for the Bucks, where he played in 328 consecutive games, never missing a regular season game. On November 19, 1994, Mayberry scored a career-high 22 points in a loss against the Seattle SuperSonics.

During the 1996 offseason, Mayberry signed with the Vancouver Grizzlies. Three seasons later he was traded to the Orlando Magic in a three-way trade, and was subsequently released.

Mayberry's teams had a record of 139–357 in games in which he played, giving him a career winning percentage of .280. As of January 2022, Mayberry has the lowest career winning percentage of any player who appeared in 400 or more games.

Mayberry also played for the US national team in the 1990 FIBA World Championship, winning the bronze medal.

== Career statistics ==
Legend
GP	Games played	GS	Games started	MPG	Minutes per game
FG%	Field goal percentage	3P%	3-point field goal percentage	FT%	Free throw percentage
RPG	Rebounds per game	APG	Assists per game	SPG	Steals per game
BPG	Blocks per game	PPG	Points per game	**Bold**	Career high
*	Led the league

=== NBA ===
Year	Team	GP	GS	MPG	FG%	3P%	FT%	RPG	APG	SPG	BPG	PPG
1992–93	Milwaukee	**82**	4	18.3	**.456**	.391	.574	1.4	3.3	0.7	**0.1**	5.2
1993–94	Milwaukee	**82***	6	18.0	.415	.345	.690	1.2	2.6	0.6	0.0	5.3
1994–95	Milwaukee	**82***	**50**	21.3	.422	**.407**	.699	1.0	3.4	0.6	0.0	**5.8**
1995–96	Milwaukee	**82**	20	20.8	.420	.397	.603	1.1	3.7	**0.8**	**0.1**	5.1
1996–97	Vancouver	80	38	**24.4**	.403	.376	.630	**1.7**	4.1	**0.8**	**0.1**	5.1
1997–98	Vancouver	79	32	23.2	.375	.350	.745	1.4	**4.4**	**0.8**	**0.1**	4.6
1998–99	Vancouver	9	0	14.0	.368	.200	**.800**	0.3	2.6	**0.8**	0.0	2.2
Career		496	150	20.8	.415	.377	.659	1.3	3.6	0.7	0.1	5.1

=== College ===
Year	Team	GP	GS	MPG	FG%	3P%	FT%	RPG	APG	SPG	BPG	PPG
1988–89	Arkansas	32	-	31.3	.500	.446	.736	3.2	4.2	1.6	0.1	12.9
1989–90	Arkansas	35	-	32.3	**.507**	**.504**	**.792**	2.9	5.2	1.9	0.2	14.5
1990–91	Arkansas	**38**	-	32.0	.484	.383	.634	**3.4**	5.5	**2.6**	0.1	13.2
1991–92	Arkansas	34	-	**34.3**	.492	.389	.744	2.3	**5.9**	2.2	**0.4**	**15.2**
Career		139	-	32.5	.495	.424	.724	2.9	5.2	2.1	0.2	14.0

== Post-NBA ==
In 2012, Mayberry was inducted into the Arkansas Sports Hall of Fame. In an interview posted on January 10, 2012, Mayberry reviewed his playing days with the Razorbacks.

An article also disclosed that Mayberry was currently "...living in Tulsa, scouting for the Golden State Warriors of the NBA".

In 2014, Mayberry was hired by the University of Arkansas as an assistant coach for the men's basketball team, for head coach Mike Anderson, who was an assistant coach during Mayberry's playing days at Arkansas. After the 2017 season, Mayberry left the University of Arkansas, and accepted an assistant head coaching position at Watson Chapel High School, in Pine Bluff, Arkansas. Mayberry was appointed as assistant coach for Oral Roberts University's women's basketball team in 2018. Mayberry now coaches the boys basketball team at Cascia Hall high school in Tulsa.

== Personal life ==
Mayberry's wife, Marla, is Senior Pastor of Antioch Baptist Church in Tulsa. He has five daughters who have played collegiate basketball. Wyvette played basketball for Tulsa University before transferring to Kansas for her junior and senior years. Taleya played for Tulsa University and later played professionally in China, Germany, Bulgaria and Iceland; she is now an assistant coach at Tulsa. Kaylan played point guard and was team captain at Oral Roberts and Maya played at Oral Roberts and at Tulsa, where she is now Director of Player Development. A younger daughter plays high school basketball for Booker T. Washington.
