= 1988–89 Texas Longhorns men's basketball team =

American college basketball season

1988–89 Texas Longhorns men's basketball

NCAA tournament, second round
- Conference: Southwest Conference
- Record: 25–9 (12–4 SWC)
- Head coach: Tom Penders (1st season)
- Home arena: Frank Erwin Center

1988–89 Southwest Conference men's basketball standings
	Conf.				Overall
Team	W		L	PCT	W		L	PCT
Arkansas †	13	–	3	.813	25	–	7	.781
Texas	12	–	4	.750	25	–	9	.735
TCU	9	–	7	.563	17	–	13	.567
Houston	8	–	8	.500	17	–	14	.548
Texas A&M	8	–	8	.500	16	–	14	.533
Texas Tech	8	–	8	.500	13	–	15	.464
SMU	7	–	9	.438	13	–	16	.448
Rice	6	–	10	.375	12	–	16	.429
Baylor	1	–	15	.063	5	–	22	.185
† 1989 SWC tournament winner Rankings from AP Poll

The 1988–89 Texas Longhorns men's basketball team represented The University of Texas at Austin in intercollegiate basketball competition during the 1988–89 season. The Longhorns were led by first-year head coach Tom Penders. The team finished the season with a 25–9 overall record and finished second in Southwest Conference play with a 12–4 conference record. Texas advanced to the NCAA tournament, recording an opening round win over Georgia Tech before falling to Missouri in the second round.

== Schedule and results ==
Date time, TV	Rank^{#}	Opponent^{#}	Result	Record	Site (attendance) city, state
Regular season
Southwest Conference tournament
Mar 10, 1989*		vs. SMU; SWC Tournament Quarterfinal	W 93–91 ^{OT}	23–7	Reunion Arena; Dallas, Texas
Mar 11, 1989*		vs. TCU; SWC Tournament Semifinal	W 93–89 ^{OT}	24–7	Reunion Arena; Dallas, Texas
Mar 12, 1989*		vs. Arkansas; SWC tournament championship	L 76–100	24–8	Reunion Arena; Dallas, Texas
1989 NCAA Tournament – No. 11 seed
Mar 17, 1989*	(11 MW)	vs. (6 MW) Georgia Tech; First Round	W 76–70	25–8	Reunion Arena; Dallas, Texas
Mar 19, 1989*	(11 MW)	vs. (3 MW) No. 6 Missouri; Second Round	L 89–108	25–9	Reunion Arena; Dallas, Texas
*Non-conference game. ^{#}Rankings from AP poll. (#) Tournament seedings in parentheses. All times are in Central Standard Time.
