= 1989–90 Houston Cougars men's basketball team =

American college basketball season

1989–90 Houston Cougars men's basketball
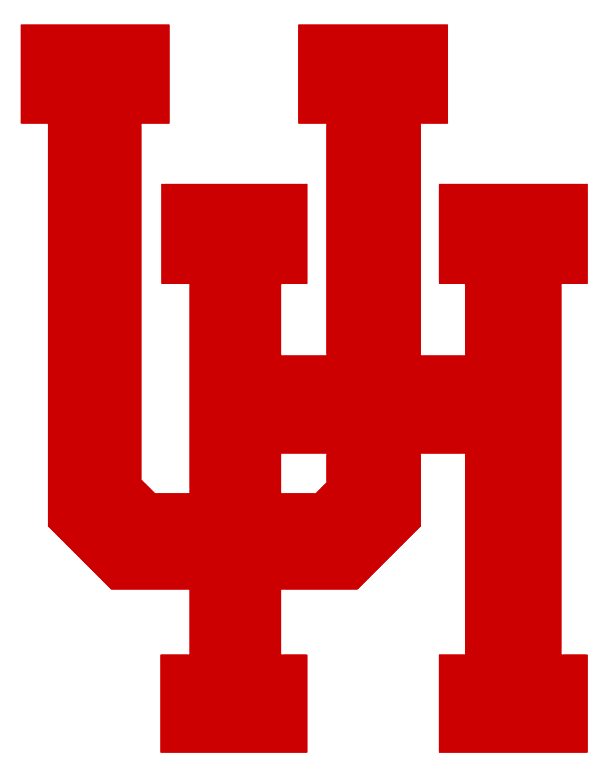

NCAA tournament, First Round
- Conference: Southwest Conference
- Record: 25–8 (13–3 SWC)
- Head coach: Pat Foster (4th season)
- Assistant coaches: Alvin Brooks; Tommy Jones
- Captains: Chris Morris; Craig Upchurch
- Home arena: Hofheinz Pavilion

1989–90 Southwest Conference men's basketball standings
	Conf.				Overall
Team	W		L	PCT	W		L	PCT
No. 7 Arkansas †	14	–	2	.875	30	–	5	.857
Houston	13	–	3	.813	25	–	8	.758
Texas	12	–	4	.750	24	–	9	.727
TCU	9	–	7	.563	16	–	13	.552
Baylor	7	–	9	.438	16	–	14	.533
Texas A&M	7	–	9	.438	14	–	17	.452
Rice	5	–	11	.313	11	–	17	.393
SMU	5	–	11	.313	10	–	18	.357
Texas Tech	0	–	16	.000	5	–	22	.185
† 1990 SWC tournament winner Rankings from AP Poll

The 1989–90 Houston Cougars men's basketball team represented the University of Houston as a member of the Southwest Conference during the 1989–90 NCAA men's basketball season. The head coach was Pat Foster, and the team played its home games at the Hofheinz Pavilion in Houston, Texas.

The Cougars played in the NCAA tournament for the first time in three seasons, and lost in the opening round to UC Santa Barbara, 70–66. Houston finished with a record of 25–8 (13–3 SWC).

== Roster ==
1989–90 Houston Cougars men's basketball team
Players
Coaches

Pos.	#	Name	Height	Weight	Year	Previous school	Hometown
F	3	Craig Upchurch	6 ft 8 in (2.03 m)	—	Jr
F	11	Carl Herrera	6 ft 9 in (2.06 m)	215 lb (98 kg)	Jr	Jacksonville JC	Canaan, Trinidad and Tobago
G	24	Byron Smith	6 ft 3 in (1.91 m)	—	Jr	Tyler JC	Bossier City, Louisiana
C	52	Álvaro Teherán	7 ft 1 in (2.16 m)	235 lb (107 kg)	Jr	Houston Baptist	María La Baja, Colombia

Head coach

- Pat Foster

Assistant coach(es)

- Alvin Brooks
- Tommy Jones

Legend

- (C) Team captain
- (S) Suspended
- (I) Ineligible
- (W) Walk-on
- Injured
- Current redshirt

== Schedule and results ==
Date time, TV	Rank^{#}	Opponent^{#}	Result	Record	Site (attendance) city, state
Regular season
Nov 15, 1989*		at Wichita State; Preseason NIT	W 67–66	1–0	Levitt Arena; Wichita, Kansas
Nov 16, 1989*		at No. 25 St. John's; Preseason NIT	L 69–76	1–1	Alumni Hall; Queens, New York
Nov 30, 1989		Hawaii Pacific	W 102–47	2–1	Hofheinz Pavilion; Houston, Texas
Dec 2, 1989*		Nevada	W 109–68	3–1	Hofheinz Pavilion; Houston, Texas
Dec 5, 1989*		DePaul	W 65–42	4–1	Hofheinz Pavilion; Houston, Texas
Dec 9, 1989*		at Virginia	L 54–72	4–2	University Hall; Charlottesville, Virginia
Dec 13, 1989*		Stephen F. Austin	W 69–56	5–2	Hofheinz Pavilion; Houston, Texas
Dec 16, 1989*		at Toledo	L 60–62	5–3	John F. Savage Hall; Toledo, Ohio
Dec 18, 1989*		at Northeastern	W 72–68	6–3	Matthews Arena; Boston, Massachusetts
Dec 28, 1989*		vs. Coastal Carolina; Holiday Classic	W 82–79	7–3	USF Sun Dome; Tampa, Florida
Dec 29, 1989*		at South Florida; Holiday Classic	W 87–78	8–3	USF Sun Dome; Tampa, Florida
Jan 3, 1990		No. 14 Arkansas	L 78–82	8–4 (0–1)	Hofheinz Pavilion; Houston, Texas
Jan 6, 1990		at Rice	W 84–69	9–4 (1–1)	Tudor Fieldhouse; Houston, Texas
Jan 10, 1990*		Iowa State	W 83–82	10–4	Hofheinz Pavilion; Houston, Texas
Jan 13, 1990		Texas Tech	W 83–63	11–4 (2–1)	Hofheinz Pavilion; Houston, Texas
Jan 17, 1990		at Baylor	W 78–74	12–4 (3–1)	Ferrell Center; Waco, Texas
Jan 20, 1990		at TCU	L 73–89	12–5 (3–2)	Daniel-Meyer Coliseum; Fort Worth, Texas
Jan 22, 1990		at No. 12 Arkansas	L 89–100	12–6 (3–3)	Barnhill Arena; Fayetteville, Arkansas
Jan 24, 1990		SMU	W 64–47	13–6 (4–3)	Hofheinz Pavilion; Houston, Texas
Jan 27, 1990		Texas A&M	W 108–90	14–6 (5–3)	Hofheinz Pavilion; Houston, Texas
Jan 30, 1990		at Texas	W 102–93	15–6 (6–3)	Frank Erwin Center; Austin, Texas
Feb 7, 1990		Rice	W 84–67	16–6 (7–3)	Hofheinz Pavilion; Houston, Texas
Feb 10, 1990*		Notre Dame	W 93–82	17–6	Hofheinz Pavilion; Houston, Texas
Feb 14, 1990		at Texas Tech	W 74–71	18–6 (8–3)	Lubbock Municipal Coliseum; Lubbock, Texas
Feb 17, 1990		Baylor	W 83–77	19–6 (9–3)	Hofheinz Pavilion; Houston, Texas
Feb 21, 1990		TCU	W 82–62	20–6 (10–3)	Hofheinz Pavilion; Houston, Texas
Feb 24, 1990		at SMU	W 71–63	21–6 (11–3)	Moody Coliseum; Dallas, Texas
Feb 28, 1990		at Texas A&M	W 100–81	22–6 (12–3)	G. Rollie White Coliseum; College Station, Texas
Mar 5, 1990		Texas	W 84–79	23–6 (13–3)	Hofheinz Pavilion; Houston, Texas
SWC tournament
Mar 9, 1990*	(2)	vs. (7) Rice; Quarterfinals	W 90–81	24–6	Reunion Arena; Dallas, Texas
Mar 10, 1990*	(2)	vs. (3) Texas; Semifinals	W 89–86	25–6	Reunion Arena; Dallas, Texas
Mar 11, 1990*	(2)	vs. (1) No. 9 Arkansas; Championship	L 84–96	25–7	Reunion Arena; Dallas, Texas
NCAA tournament
Mar 15, 1990*	(8 SE)	vs. (9 SE) UC Santa Barbara; First Round	L 66–70	25–8	Thompson-Boling Arena; Knoxville, Tennessee
*Non-conference game. ^{#}Rankings from AP Poll. (#) Tournament seedings in parentheses. SE=Southeast region.

== NBA draft ==
Round	Pick	Player	NBA club
2	30	Carl Herrera	Miami Heat
