= Nolan Richardson =

American college basketball coach (born 1941)

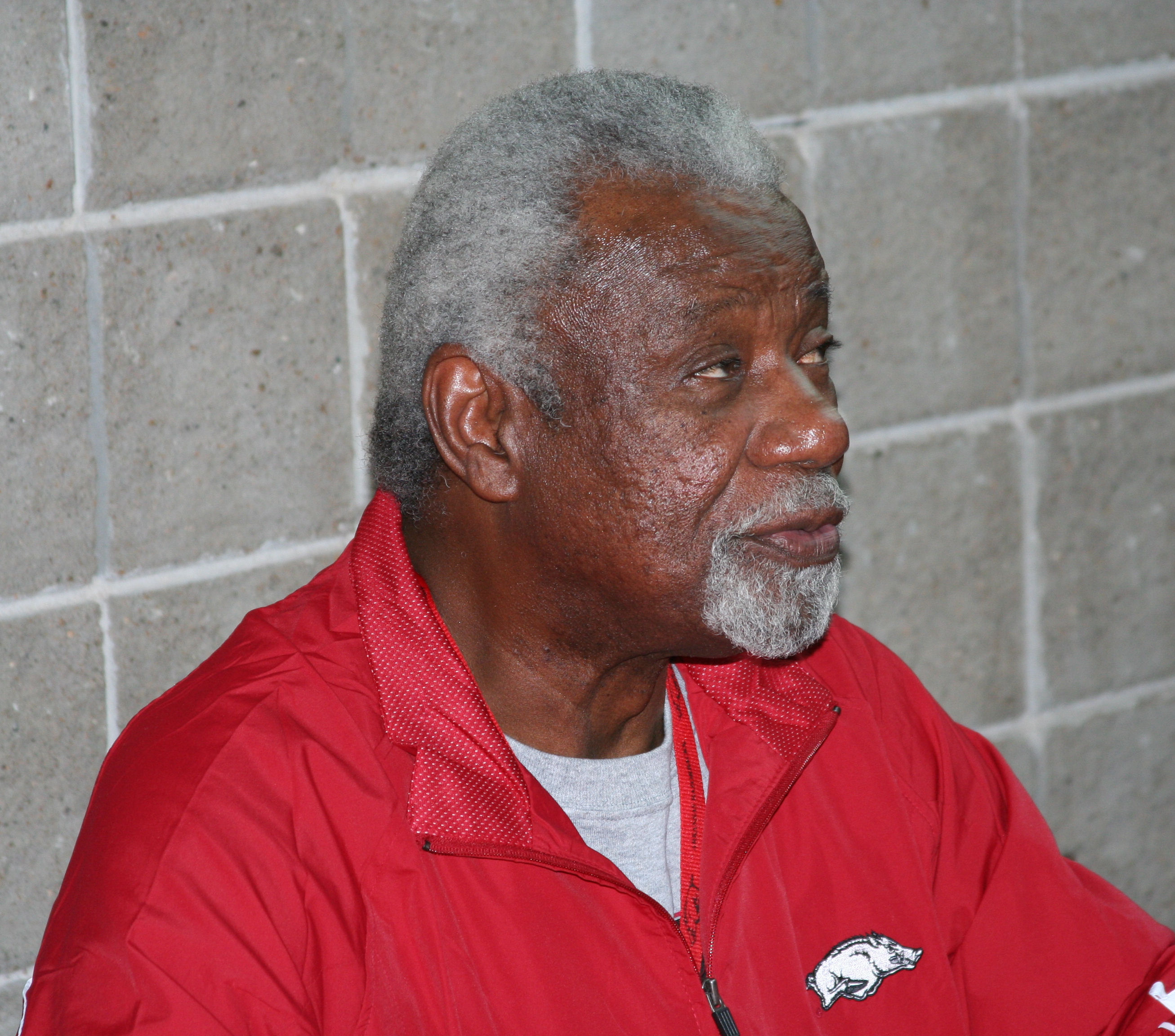
- Richardson in 2009

Biographical details
- Born: December 27, 1941 (age 84); El Paso, Texas, U.S.

Playing career
- 1961–1964: Texas Western
- Position: Forward

Coaching career (HC unless noted)
- 1968–1977: Bowie HS (TX)
- 1977–1980: Western Texas JC
- 1980–1985: Tulsa
- 1985–2002: Arkansas
- 2009–2011: Tulsa Shock

International
- 2005–2007: Panama
- 2007: Mexico

Head coaching record
- Overall: 508–206 (college)
- Tournaments: 26–14 (NCAA Division I); 9–4 (NIT)

Accomplishments and honors

Championships
- NCAA Division I tournament (1994); 3 NCAA Division I regional – Final Four (1990, 1994, 1995); NIT (1981); NJCAA tournament (1980); 2 MVC regular season (1984, 1985); 2 MVC tournament (1982, 1984); 3 SWC regular season (1989–1991); 3 SWC tournament (1989–1991); 2 SEC regular season (1992, 1994); 4 SEC West Division (1992–1995); SEC tournament (2000)

Awards
- NABC Coach of the Year (1994); Naismith College Coach of the Year (1994); 2× MVC Coach of the Year (1981, 1985); 3× SWC Coach of the Year (1989–1991); SEC Coach of the Year (1998); USBWA Most Courageous Award (1995)
- Basketball Hall of Fame; Inducted in 2014
- College Basketball Hall of Fame; Inducted in 2008

Nolan Richardson Jr. (born December 27, 1941) is an American former basketball head coach best known for his tenure at the University of Arkansas, where he won the 1994 NCAA Division I men's basketball tournament and led the Razorbacks to three Final Fours. Elected to the National Collegiate Basketball Hall of Fame in 2008 and the Naismith Memorial Basketball Hall of Fame in 2014, Richardson coached teams to winning a Division I Basketball National Championship, an NIT championship, and a Junior College National Championship, making him the only coach to win all three championships. During his 22 seasons of coaching in NCAA Division I, Richardson made a post-season tournament appearance 20 times.

== Early life ==
Richardson was born in El Segundo Barrio in El Paso, Texas, United States to Nolan Richardson Sr. and Clareast (Mims) Richardson. Clareast died from miliary tuberculosis in 1945, leaving behind three children: Shirley, age 5, Nolan Jr., age 3, and Helen, six months. Eventually they moved in with the children's grandmother, Rose Richardson or Ol' Mama. Ol' Mama had a profound impact on Nolan by helping instill the drive and determination to succeed. Nolan's father would visit, but often did not live with the family, battling alcoholism for much of his adult life.

Nolan Richardson played college basketball at Eastern Arizona Junior College during the 1959-1960 season. He then returned home to play for Texas Western College (now the University of Texas at El Paso), playing his junior and senior years under Hall of Fame coach Don Haskins for the Miners.

== Coaching career ==
=== Early years ===
Richardson began his coaching career at Bowie High School in El Paso, Texas. He coached at Bowie for ten years then moved to Western Texas Junior College for three seasons, posting a record there of 101-13. In 1979-80, his third and last season at Western Texas, he led the team to a 37-0 record and the 1980 National Junior College championship.

=== University of Tulsa ===
Richardson was the head coach at Tulsa from 1980 to 1985, leading Tulsa victory in the 1981 National Invitation Tournament. This was the first time an African American coach won an NIT championship.

Richardson is credited with bringing the Tulsa program to national prominence, and led the school to season conference championships in 1984 and 1985 and conference tournament titles in 1982 and 1984 in addition to the 1981 NIT championship. Richardson had a .763 winning percentage at Tulsa, and became the first coach in NCAA history to win 50 games in his first two seasons.

While coaching at Tulsa, Richardson became known for wearing an assortment of open-necked polka dot shirts. This trademark eventually led Tulsa students to don polka dots during home games.

=== University of Arkansas ===
In 1985, Richardson became the head coach at Arkansas after Eddie Sutton left for Kentucky. Richardson became the first African-American basketball coach at a major university in the South, and the first African-American head coach of any program at the University of Arkansas.

Richardson inherited a team and program that was used to Sutton's halfcourt-oriented, walk-it-up-the-court style. Richardson's frenetic, up-tempo system was new to Arkansas, and many fans questioned his coaching style after finishing 12-16 his first season. However, by year two he had Arkansas back in the postseason with an NIT berth. By year three, he had Arkansas in the NCAA Tournament. The Hogs would make the tournament in 13 of the next 15 seasons. In all, Arkansas under Richardson enjoyed 15 post-season appearances during the 17 seasons of his tenure.

He led Arkansas to three Final Fours—losing to Duke in the semifinals in 1990, winning the National Championship in 1994 against Duke, and losing in the Championship game to UCLA in 1995. He was named the National Coach of the Year in 1994. Richardson's Arkansas teams averaged 27 wins per season during the 1990s, and they were the winningest team of the decade until 1997. The Razorbacks' 270 wins from 1990 to 1999 were more than all but four programs in the NCAA. Nolan's Arkansas teams won at least 20 games 12 times, as well as four 30-win seasons during his 17 years.

His teams typically played an up-tempo game with intense pressure defense - a style that was known as "40 Minutes of Hell." In 2012, his coaching philosophy was featured in the documentary "40 Minutes of Hell" on ESPN as part of the network's SEC Storied series. Richardson is the winningest basketball coach in Arkansas history, compiling a 389-169 (.697) record in 17 seasons. He is the only head coach to win a Junior College National Championship, the NIT Championship, and the NCAA Championship. Richardson is also among an elite group including Roy Williams, Denny Crum, Jim Boeheim, John Calipari and Tubby Smith as the only head coaches to win 365 games in 15 seasons or fewer.

==== Controversy ====
While at Arkansas, Richardson frequently spoke out about the negative stereotypes that he and other black coaches faced. His most controversial statement occurred in a post-game press conference in February 2002, when he spoke out against the athletic administration at the University of Arkansas. He claimed that he was being mistreated because of his race, and challenged Athletic Director Frank Broyles to ruffle feathers by declaring, "If they go ahead and pay me my money, they can take my job tomorrow." Shortly thereafter, Arkansas dismissed Richardson as head coach. In December 2002, Richardson filed a lawsuit against the university, the board of trustees, and the Razorback Foundation, citing a racially discriminatory environment; the lawsuit was dismissed in July 2004.

==== Nolan Richardson Court ====
On March 28, 2019, two days after the termination of Richardson's protege Mike Anderson, the University of Arkansas Board of Trustees voted unanimously to name the court in Arkansas' Bud Walton Arena in Richardson's honor. The honor became official in the wake of growing public support to honor Richardson in this way, including a resolution proposed during the 2019 regular session of the Arkansas General Assembly.

=== International ===
From 2005 to 2007, Richardson, (who speaks fluent Spanish) served as the head coach of the Panama national team. In March 2007, Richardson was named head coach of the Mexico national basketball team.

=== WNBA ===
In the middle of 2009, Richardson was named as head coach and general manager of a prospective WNBA expansion team in Tulsa, Oklahoma. While it seemed unusual to hire a coach before securing an actual berth in the league, the investors behind the expansion effort claimed this proved they were serious about wanting a team. On October 20, 2009, the Tulsa group bought the Detroit Shock and moved it to Tulsa as the Tulsa Shock. It was Richardson's first time as a professional head coach, as well as his first time coaching women.

Richardson's tenure with the Shock was unsuccessful. His first season was hamstrung when key players who had led the Shock to three WNBA titles opted not to make the move to Tulsa. This forced Richardson to build the team around disgraced Olympic track star Marion Jones, who hadn't played organized basketball in 13 years. The players found it difficult to adjust to Richardson's frenetic style, and were plagued by a lack of continuity. All of the players who had come from Detroit left the team by the middle of the season, causing the roster to shift on a game-by-game basis. The final result was a 6-28 record, last in the league.

Before the following season, Richardson tried to rebuild the team by coaxing Sheryl Swoopes out of retirement, but after a 1-10 start, he resigned on July 8, 2011.

== Head coaching record ==
=== Junior college ===
Record table
Season	Team	Overall	Conference	Standing	Postseason
Western Texas Junior College (Western Junior College Athletic Conference) (1977–1980)
1977–78	Western Texas Junior College	30–8			
1978–79	Western Texas Junior College	34–5		1st	
1979–80	Western Texas Junior College	37–0		1st	NJCAA National Champions
Total:		101–13 (.886)			
National champion Postseason invitational champion Conference regular season champion Conference regular season and conference tournament champion Division regular season champion Division regular season and conference tournament champion Conference tournament champion

=== College ===
Record table
Season	Team	Overall	Conference	Standing	Postseason
Tulsa Golden Hurricane (Missouri Valley Conference) (1980–1985)
1980–81	Tulsa	26–7	11–5	T–2nd	NIT champion
1981–82	Tulsa	24–6	12–4	T–2nd	NCAA Division I first round
1982–83	Tulsa	19–12	11–7	T–3rd	NIT first round
1983–84	Tulsa	27–4	13–3	T–1st	NCAA Division I first round
1984–85	Tulsa	23–8	12–4	1st	NCAA Division I first round
Tulsa:		119–37 (.763)	59–22 (.778)		
Arkansas Razorbacks (Southwest Conference) (1985–1991)
1985–86	Arkansas	12–16	4–12	7th	
1986–87	Arkansas	19–14	8–8	5th	NIT second round
1987–88	Arkansas	21–9	11–5	T–2nd	NCAA Division I first round
1988–89	Arkansas	25–7	13–3	1st	NCAA Division I second round
1989–90	Arkansas	30–5	14–2	1st	NCAA Division I Final Four
1990–91	Arkansas	34–4	15–1	1st	NCAA Division I Elite Eight
Arkansas Razorbacks (Southeastern Conference) (1991–2002)
1991–92	Arkansas	26–8	13–3	1st	NCAA Division I second round
1992–93	Arkansas	22–9	10–6	1st (West)	NCAA Division I Sweet 16
1993–94	Arkansas	31–3	14–2	1st	NCAA Division I champion
1994–95	Arkansas	32–7	12–4	T–1st (West)	NCAA Division I Runner-up
1995–96	Arkansas	20–13	9–7	T–2nd (West)	NCAA Division I Sweet 16
1996–97	Arkansas	18–14	8–8	2nd (West)	NIT semifinal
1997–98	Arkansas	24–9	11–5	2nd (West)	NCAA Division I second round
1998–99	Arkansas	23–11	9–7	2nd (West)	NCAA Division I second round
1999–00	Arkansas	19–15	7–9	3rd (West)	NCAA Division I first round
2000–01	Arkansas	20–11	10–6	2nd (West)	NCAA Division I first round
2001–02	Arkansas	13–14†	5–10†	T–4th (West)	
Arkansas:		389–169 (.697)	173–98 (.638)		
Total:		508–206 (.711)			
National champion Postseason invitational champion Conference regular season champion Conference regular season and conference tournament champion Division regular season champion Division regular season and conference tournament champion Conference tournament champion

†Richardson was replaced by interim coach Mike Anderson before the end of the season.

=== WNBA ===
Legend
Regular season	G	Games coached	W	Games won	L	Games lost	W–L %	Win–loss %
Playoffs	PG	Playoff games	PW	Playoff wins	PL	Playoff losses	PW–L %	Playoff win–loss %

Team	Year	G	W	L	W–L%	Finish	PG	PW	PL	PW–L%	Result
Tulsa	2010	34	6	28	.176	5th in Western					
Tulsa	2011	11	1	10	.091	(resigned)					
Career		45	7	38	.156						

== See also ==
- List of NCAA Division I Men's Final Four appearances by coach
