= Lenzie Howell =

American basketball player (1967–2020)

Personal information
- Born: December 24, 1967 Dallas, Texas, U.S.
- Died: July 18, 2020 (aged 52) Dallas, Texas, U.S.
- Listed height: 6 ft 4 in (1.93 m)
- Listed weight: 200 lb (91 kg)

Career information
- High school: Bryan Adams (Dallas, Texas)
- College: San Jacinto (1986–1988); Arkansas (1988–1990)
- NBA draft: 1990: undrafted
- Playing career: 1990–2002
- Position: Small forward
- Number: 9

Career history
- 1990–1992: Computerij Meppel
- 1992–1993: Tofaş
- 1993–1996: cuva Houthalen
- 1996–1997: castor Braine
- 1997–1998: Montpellier
- 1998–1999: Cholet
- 2000–2001: Bourg-en-Bresse
- 2001–2002: Rueil AC

Career highlights
- 2x Dutch League Most Valuable Player (1991, 1992); Dutch League Dunk champion (1992); Belgium league leading scorer (1996); SWC tournament Most Outstanding Player (1989)

Lenzie Howell (December 24, 1967 – July 18, 2020) was an American basketball player. Standing at 6 ft 4 in (1.93 m), he played as small forward. He played college basketball with Arkansas for two seasons.

During his brief college stay, Howell received several awards, including the 1989 Southwest Conference tournament Most Outstanding Player award, being named to the 1990 NCAA tournament Midwest Regional Team and winning that region's Most Outstanding Player award. Earlier that year, on February 21, Howell had arguably his finest regular season performance – 32 points, 10 rebounds, four assists and a steal against Texas A&M. Considered a great follow-up shooter, and despite typically playing against much bigger defenders, he was Arkansas' leading scorer and second-leading rebounder in the 1990 tournament and was a constant in an otherwise-erratic offense.

After his stint with Arkansas, Howell played a decade in Europe. While playing for Computerij Meppel, he won the Dutch League Most Valuable Player twice.

Lenzie Howell died on July 18, 2020, aged 52.
