= Todd Day =

American basketball player (born 1970)

Personal information
- Born: January 7, 1970 (age 56) Decatur, Illinois, U.S.
- Listed height: 6 ft 6 in (1.98 m)
- Listed weight: 188 lb (85 kg)

Career information
- High school: Hamilton (Memphis, Tennessee)
- College: Arkansas (1988–1992)
- NBA draft: 1992: 1st round, 8th overall pick
- Drafted by: Milwaukee Bucks
- Playing career: 1992–2007
- Position: Shooting guard
- Number: 10, 13, 11
- Coaching career: 2016–present

Career history

Playing
- 1992–1995: Milwaukee Bucks
- 1995–1997: Boston Celtics
- 1997: Miami Heat
- 1998: Scavolini Pesaro
- 1998–1999: La Crosse Bobcats
- 1999–2000: Phoenix Suns
- 2000–2001: Minnesota Timberwolves
- 2004–2005: Arkansas RimRockers
- 2005–2006: APOEL
- 2006: Argentino de Junín
- 2006–2007: Arkansas Aeros

Coaching
- 2016–2025: Philander Smith

Career highlights
- ABA All-Star (2005); Second-team All-American – NABC (1992); Second-team All-American – AP (1991); Third-team All-American – AP (1992); Third-team All-American – NABC (1991); 2× First-team All-SWC (1990, 1991); First-team All-SEC (1992); Third-team Parade All-American (1988); McDonald's All-American (1988); Class AAA Tennessee Mr. Basketball (1988)

Career NBA statistics
- Points: 5,917 (12.3 ppg)
- Rebounds: 1,649 (3.4 rpg)
- Assists: 713 (1.5 apg)
- Stats at NBA.com
- Stats at Basketball Reference
Medals
Men's basketball
Representing United States
FIBA World Championship
Bronze medal – third place	1990 Argentina	National team
Goodwill Games
Silver medal – second place	1990 Seattle	National team

Todd Fitzgerald Day (born January 7, 1970) is an American former professional basketball player and current head coach at Philander Smith College in Little Rock, Arkansas. Day is the all-time leading scorer at the University of Arkansas, and played eight seasons in the NBA. During the 2006 season, he played for the Blue Stars of Lebanon's WASL Club League.

== High school career ==
Day played for his stepfather, Ted Anderson at Memphis's Hamilton High School, where he was a McDonald's All-American and a third-team Parade All-American. He also earned All-State and All-District honors during his prep career. Day was named Tennessee's Mr. Basketball for Class AAA following his senior year in 1988.

== Collegiate career ==
Day played college basketball at the University of Arkansas for coach Nolan Richardson, and was a four-year letterman ('89,'90,'91 and '92). Day broke Sidney Moncrief's school record for scoring with 2,395 points. Day was a member of the All-Southwest Conference Newcomer Team as a freshman, a member of the Arkansas unit that reached the NCAA Final Four as a sophomore, and a John Wooden First-Team All-America selection as both a junior and senior. Day helped Arkansas win three consecutive Southwest Conference regular season championships from 1989 to 1991, as well as three straight SWC Tournament championships, also from 1989 to 1991. Day was named the Most Outstanding Player for the 1990 SWC Tournament. In his final college season, he powered the Razorbacks to the Southeastern Conference regular seasons title, as well as the SEC West Division championship, in the school's first season in the league. His scoring average (22.7 ppg) was the third highest in school history. Day holds several school records, including career points (2,395), and points in a season (786). During Day's time at Arkansas, the Razorbacks made the NCAA Tournament every year, advancing to the second round in 1989, the Final Four in 1990, the Elite Eight in 1991, and the second round in 1992. He played for the US national team in the 1990 FIBA World Championship, winning the bronze medal. He averaged 6.3 points per game during the tournament, while helping the last collegiate team ever to represent the USA on a major international tournament win the bronze medal.

== Professional career ==
Day was selected in the 1st round (8th pick) by the Milwaukee Bucks in the 1992 NBA draft. He was joined in the first round by teammates Oliver Miller and Lee Mayberry, giving the Razorbacks three first round selections that year. He was traded with Alton Lister to the Boston Celtics for Sherman Douglas on December 22, 1995. Day scored a career high 41 points against the Minnesota Timberwolves, tying Larry Bird's Celtic franchise record for points in a quarter with 24.

Day only reached the playoffs once in his eight NBA seasons, with the 1999-00 Phoenix Suns. In nine games that postseason, Day contributed to a first-round upset of the defending champion San Antonio Spurs and a second-round loss to the Los Angeles Lakers. During his NBA career, Day also played for the Miami Heat, the Phoenix Suns and the Minnesota Timberwolves, averaging 12.3 points per game. With Day's departure the Bucks selected Ray Allen with the 5th overall pick of the 1996 NBA draft .

Day joined the Arkansas Rimrockers for their inaugural season in the ABA basketball league in 2004–05. In their only season in the league, the Rimrockers had a record of 32–5, defeating the Bellevue Blackhawks 118–103 in Alltel Arena for the league championship. Day finished the game with 32 points and 6 steals. Day was named 1st Team All-ABA and was an ABA All-Star. Day helped Rayyan (Qatar) win the 16th FedEx FIBA Asia Champions Cup in 2005, scoring 24 points in the victory over Fastlink (Jordan). Day signed a free agent contract with the Detroit Pistons, but was released in training camp. Day returned to the ABA for the 2006–07 season, playing with the Arkansas Aeros. He was selected to play in the ABA All-Star Game on January 28, 2007, in Halifax, Nova Scotia. Day was averaging 21.4 points per game prior to the All-Star Game. Day also had a stint playing for the Harlem Globetrotters.

== NBA career statistics ==
Legend
GP	Games played	GS	Games started	MPG	Minutes per game
FG%	Field goal percentage	3P%	3-point field goal percentage	FT%	Free throw percentage
RPG	Rebounds per game	APG	Assists per game	SPG	Steals per game
BPG	Blocks per game	PPG	Points per game	**Bold**	Career high
*	Led the league

=== Regular season ===
Year	Team	GP	GS	MPG	FG%	3P%	FT%	RPG	APG	SPG	BPG	PPG
1992–93	Milwaukee	71	37	27.2	**.432**	.293	.717	**4.1**	1.6	1.1	0.7	13.8
1993–94	Milwaukee	76	39	28.0	.415	.223	.698	**4.1**	**1.8**	**1.4**	0.7	12.7
1994–95	Milwaukee	**82***	**81**	**33.1**	.424	**.390**	.754	3.9	1.6	1.3	**0.8**	**16.0**
1995–96	Milwaukee	8	0	21.4	.310	.200	**.923**	2.8	0.6	0.5	0.4	9.1
1995–96	Boston	71	12	23.0	.371	.343	.766	2.8	1.4	1.1	0.7	12.0
1996–97	Boston	81	27	28.1	.398	.362	.773	**4.1**	1.4	1.3	0.6	14.5
1997–98	Miami	5	0	13.8	.355	.167	.667	1.2	1.4	**1.4**	0.0	6.0
1999–00	Phoenix	58	1	16.2	.394	.388	.667	2.2	1.1	0.8	0.4	6.8
2000–01	Minnesota	31	0	11.1	.373	.377	.783	1.2	0.9	0.3	0.2	4.3
Career		483	197	25.3	.406	.345	.739	3.4	1.5	1.1	0.6	12.3

=== Playoffs ===
Year	Team	GP	GS	MPG	FG%	3P%	FT%	RPG	APG	SPG	BPG	PPG
1999–00	Phoenix	9	0	11.1	.457	.313	.500	1.1	0.4	0.4	0.1	4.7

== Coaching career ==
Day was named head coach for the Arkansas Impact of the Premier Basketball League, in December 2007. The Impact began their season in January 2008 and played their home games in Little Rock's Barton Coliseum, but are no longer in operation. Day led the Impact to the 2008 Championship Game, losing to the Rochester Razorsharks 142–112. Day entered high school coaching when he was named head coach at the Memphis Academy of Health and Sciences, where he coached for five seasons. He became the head coach at his alma mater, Hamilton High School, when former head coach Keelon Lawson resigned to join Josh Pastner's staff at the University of Memphis. He also worked as an assistant coach for Team Penny, a Memphis-based AAU team founded by head coach Penny Hardaway. In June 2016, Day was named head coach of the Men's Basketball program at Philander Smith College in Little Rock, AR. His son T.J. Day serves as an assistant coach for the team. Day stepped down as head coach after the 2024-25 season.

=== College ===
Record table
Season	Team	Overall	Conference	Standing	Postseason
Philander Smith Panthers (Gulf Coast Athletic Conference) (2016–present)
2016–17	Philander Smith	17-13	7-5		
2017–18	Philander Smith	17-11	7-5		
2018–19	Philander Smith	11-19	8-6		
2019–20	Philander Smith	11-18	8-6		
2020–21	Philander Smith	9-10	2-5		
2021–22	Philander Smith	16-8	6-2		
2022–23	Philander Smith	22-7	10-4		
2023–24	Philander Smith	21-9	14-4		NAIA first round
2024–25	Philander Smith	22-9	11-6		
Philander Smith:		135–101 (.569)	84–46 (.626)		
Total:		135–101 (.569)			
National champion Postseason invitational champion Conference regular season champion Conference regular season and conference tournament champion Division regular season champion Division regular season and conference tournament champion Conference tournament champion

== Personal ==
Todd Day was inducted as a member of the 2008 class of the Arkansas Sports Hall of Fame, and he was one of nine former Razorbacks inducted into the Southwest Conference Hall of Fame in November 2015. Day is a member of Alpha Phi Alpha fraternity.
