= 1990–91 Gonzaga Bulldogs men's basketball team =

American college basketball season

1990–91 Gonzaga Bulldogs men's basketball
- Conference: West Coast Conference
- Record: 14–14 (5–9 WCC)
- Head coach: Dan Fitzgerald (9th season)
- Assistant coaches: Dan Monson; Mark Few
- Home arena: Martin Centre

1990–91 West Coast Conference men's basketball standings
	Conf.				Overall
Team	W		L	PCT	W		L	PCT
Pepperdine †	13	–	1	.929	22	–	9	.710
Loyola Marymount	9	–	5	.643	16	–	15	.516
San Diego	8	–	6	.571	17	–	12	.586
Saint Mary's	7	–	7	.500	13	–	17	.433
Santa Clara	7	–	7	.500	16	–	13	.552
Gonzaga	5	–	9	.357	14	–	14	.500
San Francisco	4	–	10	.286	12	–	17	.414
Portland	3	–	11	.214	5	–	23	.179
† Conference tournament winner Rankings from AP poll

The 1990–91 Gonzaga Bulldogs men's basketball team represented Gonzaga University in the West Coast Conference (WCC) during the 1990–91 NCAA Division I men's basketball season. Led by ninth-year head coach Dan Fitzgerald, the Bulldogs were 14–13 (.519) overall in the regular season (5–9 in WCC, sixth), and played their home games on campus at the Charlotte Y. Martin Centre in Spokane, Washington.

At the fifth conference tournament, the Zags lost again in the quarterfinals, this time to San Diego, to finish at 14–14 (.500). Their first tournament wins came a year later in 1992; they advanced to the final, but fell by three to top-seeded Pepperdine.

== Postseason results ==
Date time, TV	Rank^{#}	Opponent^{#}	Result	Record	Site (attendance) city, state
WCC tournament
Sat, March 2	(6)	vs. (3) San Diego; Quarterfinal	L 62–72	14–14	Toso Pavilion; Santa Clara, California
*Non-conference game. ^{#}Rankings from AP poll. (#) Tournament seedings in parentheses. All times are in Pacific time.
