= 1990–91 NCAA Division I men's basketball season =

Basketball season

- Preseason AP No. 1: UNLV Runnin' Rebels
- NCAA Tournament: 1991
- Tournament dates: March 14 – April 1, 1991
- National Championship: Hoosier Dome; Indianapolis, Indiana
- NCAA Champions: Duke Blue Devils
- Other champions: Stanford Cardinal (NIT)
- Player of the Year (Naismith, Wooden): Larry Johnson, UNLV Runnin' Rebels

The 1990–91 NCAA Division I men's basketball season began in November 1990 and ended with the Final Four at the Hoosier Dome in Indianapolis, Indiana on April 1, 1991. The Duke Blue Devils won their first NCAA national championship with a 72–65 victory over the Kansas Jayhawks.

== Season headlines ==
- The Patriot League began play, with seven original members.
- In a game on January 5, 1991, between two teams specializing in the fast-break offense, Kevin Bradshaw of U.S.International set a new NCAA record for points scored by a single player against an NCAA Division I opponent, scoring 72 points in a 186–140 loss to Loyola Marymount. Bradshaw broke LSU shooting guard Pete Maravich's record of 69 points, set in a February 1970 game against Alabama.
- In the 1991 NCAA tournament, a No. 15 seed defeated a No. 2 seed for the first time in tournament history, when Richmond topped Syracuse 73–69 in a first-round game.
- UNLV was the first team since the 1975–76 Indiana Hoosiers to enter the NCAA tournament unbeaten. The Runnin' Rebels reached 34–0 (and 45 straight wins dating to the previous season) before losing 79–77 to Duke in the national semifinals.
- Eddie Sutton of Oklahoma State became the first head coach to take four different teams to the NCAA tournament. He had done it previously with Creighton in 1974, Arkansas in 1977, and Kentucky in 1986.
- North Carolina's Dean Smith became the first head coach to take a school to the NCAA tournament's Final Four in four different decades. He coached North Carolina to the Final Four 11 times between 1967 and 1997.
- Duke won its first national championship in its ninth (and fourth consecutive) Final Four appearance.
- The American South Conference disbanded at the end of the season.

== Major rule changes ==
Beginning in 1990–91, the following rule changes were implemented:

- Players fouled in the act of shooting a missed three-pointer received three free throws instead of the previous two.
- Starting with the 10th team foul of each half, the fouled team receives two free throws, regardless of whether the foul was committed in the act of shooting (except for player control fouls).

== Season outlook ==
=== Pre-season polls ===
The top 25 from the AP Poll and Coaches Poll during the pre-season.

Associated Press
Ranking	Team
1	UNLV
2	Arkansas
3	Arizona
4	Michigan State
5	North Carolina
6	Duke
7	Alabama
8	Indiana
9	Georgetown
10	Ohio State
11	UCLA
12	Pittsburgh
13	Syracuse
14	LSU
15	Oklahoma
16	Georgia Tech
17	Connecticut
18	Virginia
19	Temple
20	Missouri
21	Georgia
22	Texas
23	Louisville
24	Southern Miss
25	St. John's

UPI Coaches
Ranking	Team
1	UNLV
2	Arizona
3	Arkansas
4	North Carolina
5	Michigan State
6	Duke
7	Georgetown
8	Indiana
9	Alabama
10	UCLA
11	Ohio State
12	Oklahoma
13	LSU
13	Connecticut
15	Pittsburgh
16	Syracuse
17	Georgia Tech
18	Southern Miss
19	Virginia
20	Kansas
21	Texas
22	Louisville
23	Georgia
24	Temple
25	Notre Dame

== Conference membership changes ==
School	Former conference	New conference
Akron Zips	NCAA Division I independent	Mid-Continent Conference
Army Cadets	Metro Atlantic Athletic Conference	Patriot League
Bucknell Bison	East Coast Conference	Patriot League
Cal State Northridge Matadors	CCAA (D-II)	NCAA Division I independent
Central Connecticut State Blue Devils	NCAA Division I independent	East Coast Conference
Central Florida Knights	NCAA Division I independent	American South Conference
Colgate Raiders	North Atlantic Conference	Patriot League
Davidson Wildcats	NCAA Division I independent	Big South Conference
Fordham Rams	Metro Atlantic Athletic Conference	Patriot League
Hardin–Simmons Cowboys	Trans America Athletic Conference	Texas Intercollegiate Athletic Association (D-III)
Holy Cross Crusaders	Metro Atlantic Athletic Conference	Patriot League
Lafayette Leopards	East Coast Conference	Patriot League
Lehigh Engineers	East Coast Conference	Patriot League
UMBC Retrievers	NCAA Division I independent	East Coast Conference
Milwaukee Panthers	NCAA Division II independent	NCAA Division I independent
Northeastern Illinois Golden Eagles	NCAA Division II independent	NCAA Division I independent
Northern Illinois Huskies	NCAA Division I independent	Mid-Continent Conference
Southeastern Louisiana Lions	No team	NCAA Division I independent
Southwest Missouri State Bears	Mid-Continent Conference	Missouri Valley Conference

== Regular season ==
=== Conferences ===
==== Conference winners and tournaments ====
Conference	Regular season first place	Conference player of the year	Conference Coach of the Year	Conference tournament	Tournament venue (city)	Tournament winner
American South Conference	Arkansas State & New Orleans (Note: Top seed in conference tournament.)	Tank Collins, New Orleans	Nelson Catalina, Arkansas State	1991 American South Conference men's basketball tournament	Lakefront Arena (New Orleans, LA)	Louisiana Tech
Atlantic 10 Conference	Rutgers	Keith Hughes, Rutgers	John Carroll, Duquesne	1991 Atlantic 10 men's basketball tournament	Palestra (Philadelphia, PA)	Penn State
Atlantic Coast Conference	Duke	Rodney Monroe, NC State	Dave Odom, Wake Forest	1991 ACC men's basketball tournament	Charlotte Coliseum; Charlotte, NC	North Carolina
Big East Conference	Syracuse	Billy Owens, Syracuse	Jim Boeheim, Syracuse	1991 Big East men's basketball tournament	Madison Square Garden (New York, NY)	Seton Hall
Big Eight Conference	Kansas & Oklahoma State	Byron Houston, Oklahoma State & Doug Smith, Missouri	Danny Nee, Nebraska	1991 Big Eight Conference men's basketball tournament	Kemper Arena (Kansas City, MO)	Missouri
Big Sky Conference	Montana	Kevin Kearney, Montana	Stew Morrill, Montana	1991 Big Sky Conference men's basketball tournament	Dahlberg Arena (Missoula, MT)	Montana
Big South Conference	Coastal Carolina	Tony Dunkin, Coastal Carolina	Oliver Purnell, Radford	1991 Big South Conference men's basketball tournament	Civic Center of Anderson (Anderson, SC)	Coastal Carolina
Big Ten Conference	Indiana & Ohio State	Jim Jackson, Ohio State	Randy Ayers, Ohio State	No Tournament		
Big West Conference	UNLV	Larry Johnson, UNLV	Jerry Tarkanian, UNLV	1991 Big West Conference men's basketball tournament	Long Beach Arena (Long Beach, CA)	UNLV
Colonial Athletic Association	James Madison	Steve Hood, James Madison	Dick Tarrant, Richmond	1991 CAA men's basketball tournament	Richmond Coliseum (Richmond, VA)	Richmond
East Coast Conference	Towson State	Devin Boyd, Towson State	Terry Truax, Towson State	1991 East Coast Conference men's basketball tournament	Towson Center (Towson, MD)	Towson State
Ivy League	Princeton	Kit Mueller, Princeton	Not named	No Tournament		
Metro Conference	Southern Miss	Clarence Weatherspoon, Southern Miss	Perry Clark, Tulane	1991 Metro Conference men's basketball tournament	Roanoke Civic Center (Roanoke, VA)	Florida State
Metro Atlantic Athletic Conference	La Salle & Siena	Marc Brown, Siena	Ted Fiore, Saint Peter's	1991 MAAC men's basketball tournament	Knickerbocker Arena (Albany, NY)	Saint Peter's
Mid-American Conference	Eastern Michigan	Marcus Kennedy, Eastern Michigan	Ben Braun, Eastern Michigan	1991 MAC men's basketball tournament	Cobo Arena (Detroit, MI)	Eastern Michigan
Mid-Continent Conference	Northern Illinois	Tony Bennett, Wisconsin–Green Bay	Jim Molinari, Northern Illinois	1991 Mid-Continent Conference men's basketball tournament	Brown County Veterans Memorial Arena (Green Bay, WI)	Wisconsin–Green Bay
Mid-Eastern Athletic Conference	Coppin State	Larry Stewart, Coppin State	Fang Mitchell, Coppin State	1991 MEAC men's basketball tournament	Norfolk Scope (Norfolk, VA)	Florida A&M
Midwestern Collegiate Conference	Xavier	Darin Archbold, Butler	Barry Collier, Butler	1991 Midwestern Collegiate Conference men's basketball tournament	UD Arena (Dayton, OH)	Xavier
Missouri Valley Conference	Creighton	Chad Gallagher, Creighton	Tates Locke, Indiana State	1991 Missouri Valley Conference men's basketball tournament	Kiel Auditorium (St. Louis, MO)	Creighton
North Atlantic Conference	Northeastern	Matt Johnson, Vermont	Tom Brennan, Vermont	1991 North Atlantic Conference men's basketball tournament	Matthews Arena (Boston, MA)	Northeastern
Northeast Conference	Fairleigh Dickinson & Saint Francis (PA)	Mike Iuzzolino, Saint Francis (PA)	Rich Zvosec, St. Francis (NY)	1991 Northeast Conference men's basketball tournament	DeGol Arena (Loretto, PA)	Saint Francis (PA)
Ohio Valley Conference	Murray State	Popeye Jones, Murray State	Dave Loos, Austin Peay	1991 Ohio Valley Conference men's basketball tournament	Racer Arena (Murray, KY)	Murray State
Pacific-10 Conference	Arizona	Terrell Brandon, Oregon	Kelvin Sampson, Washington State	No Tournament		
Patriot League	Fordham	Damon Lopez, Fordham	Nick Macarchuk, Fordham	1991 Patriot League men's basketball tournament	Hart Center (Worcester, MA)	Fordham
Southeastern Conference	LSU & Mississippi State	Shaquille O'Neal, LSU	Rick Pitino, Kentucky	1991 SEC men's basketball tournament	Memorial Gymnasium (Nashville, TN)	Alabama
Southern Conference	East Tennessee State & Furman	Keith Jennings, East Tennessee State	Butch Estes, Furman	1991 Southern Conference men's basketball tournament	Asheville Civic Center (Asheville, NC)	East Tennessee State
Southland Conference	Northeast Louisiana	Carlos Funchess, Northeast Louisiana & Anthony Jones, Northeast Louisiana	Ned Fowler, Stephen F. Austin	1991 Southland Conference men's basketball tournament	Fant–Ewing Coliseum (Monroe, LA)	Northeast Louisiana
Southwest Conference	Arkansas	Oliver Miller, Arkansas	Nolan Richardson, Arkansas	1991 Southwest Conference men's basketball tournament	Reunion Arena (Dallas, TX)	Arkansas
Southwestern Athletic Conference	Jackson State	Steve Rogers, Alabama State	Andy Stoglin, Jackson State	1991 SWAC men's basketball tournament	Health and Physical Education Arena (Houston, TX)	Jackson State
Sun Belt Conference	South Alabama	Chris Gatling, Old Dominion	Ronnie Arrow, South Alabama	1991 Sun Belt Conference men's basketball tournament	Mobile Civic Center (Mobile, AL)	South Alabama
Trans America Athletic Conference	Texas–San Antonio	Patrick Greer, Centenary	Tommy Vardeman, Centenary	1991 TAAC men's basketball tournament	Edmunds Center (DeLand, FL)	Georgia State
West Coast Athletic Conference	Pepperdine	Doug Christie, Pepperdine	Tom Asbury, Pepperdine	1991 West Coast Conference men's basketball tournament	Toso Pavilion (Santa Clara, CA)	Pepperdine
Western Athletic Conference	Utah	Josh Grant, Utah	Rick Majerus, Utah	1991 WAC men's basketball tournament	Arena-Auditorium (Laramie, WY)	BYU

==== Conference standings ====
1990–91 American South Conference men's basketball standings
	Conf.				Overall
Team	W		L	PCT	W		L	PCT
New Orleans	9	–	3	.750	23	–	8	.742
Arkansas State	9	–	3	.750	23	–	9	.719
Louisiana Tech †	8	–	4	.667	21	–	10	.677
Southwestern Louisiana	6	–	6	.500	21	–	10	.677
Lamar	4	–	8	.333	15	–	13	.536
UCF	3	–	9	.250	10	–	17	.370
Texas–Pan American	3	–	9	.250	7	–	21	.250
† 1991 American South tournament winner Rankings from AP Poll

1990–91 ACC men's basketball standings
	Conf.				Overall
Team	W		L	PCT	W		L	PCT
No. 6 Duke	11	–	3	.786	32	–	7	.821
No. 4 North Carolina †	10	–	4	.714	29	–	6	.829
Wake Forest	8	–	6	.571	19	–	11	.633
NC State	8	–	6	.571	20	–	11	.645
Georgia Tech	6	–	8	.429	17	–	13	.567
Virginia	6	–	8	.429	21	–	12	.636
Maryland	5	–	9	.357	16	–	12	.571
Clemson	2	–	12	.143	11	–	17	.393
† 1991 ACC tournament winner Rankings from AP poll

1990–91 Atlantic 10 men's basketball standings
	Conf.				Overall
Team	W		L	PCT	W		L	PCT
Rutgers	14	–	4	.778	19	–	10	.655
Temple	13	–	5	.722	24	–	10	.706
Penn State †	10	–	8	.556	21	–	11	.656
George Washington	10	–	8	.556	19	–	12	.613
UMass	10	–	8	.556	20	–	13	.606
West Virginia	10	–	8	.556	17	–	14	.548
Duquesne	10	–	8	.556	13	–	15	.464
Saint Joseph's	7	–	11	.389	13	–	17	.433
Rhode Island	6	–	12	.333	11	–	17	.393
St. Bonaventure	0	–	18	.000	5	–	23	.179
† 1991 Atlantic 10 Tournament winner Rankings from AP Poll

1990–91 Big East men's basketball standings
	Conf.				Overall
Team	W		L	PCT	W		L	PCT
No. 7 Syracuse	12	–	4	.750	26	–	6	.813
No. 20 St. John's	10	–	6	.625	23	–	9	.719
Connecticut	9	–	7	.563	20	–	11	.645
No. 13 Seton Hall †	9	–	7	.563	25	–	9	.735
Pittsburgh	9	–	7	.563	21	–	12	.636
Georgetown	8	–	8	.500	19	–	13	.594
Providence	7	–	9	.438	19	–	13	.594
Villanova	7	–	9	.438	17	–	15	.531
Boston College	1	–	15	.063	11	–	19	.367
† 1991 Big East tournament winner As of April 1, 1991; Rankings from AP Poll

1990–91 Big Eight Conference men's basketball standings
	Conf.				Overall
Team	W		L	PCT	W		L	PCT
No. 14 Oklahoma State	10	–	4	.714	24	–	8	.750
No. 12 Kansas	10	–	4	.714	27	–	8	.771
No. 11 Nebraska	9	–	5	.643	26	–	8	.765
Missouri †	8	–	6	.571	20	–	10	.667
Iowa State	6	–	8	.429	12	–	19	.387
Oklahoma	5	–	9	.357	20	–	15	.571
Colorado	5	–	9	.357	19	–	14	.576
Kansas State	3	–	11	.214	13	–	15	.464
† 1991 Big Eight tournament winner As of April 1, 1991; Rankings from AP poll

1990–91 Big Sky men's basketball standings
	Conf.				Overall
Team	W		L	PCT	W		L	PCT
Montana †	13	–	3	.813	23	–	8	.742
Nevada	12	–	4	.750	17	–	14	.548
Idaho	11	–	5	.688	19	–	11	.633
Boise State	10	–	6	.625	17	–	10	.630
Idaho State	7	–	9	.438	11	–	18	.379
Weber State	7	–	9	.438	12	–	16	.429
Montana State	6	–	10	.375	12	–	16	.429
Eastern Washington	5	–	11	.313	11	–	16	.407
Northern Arizona	1	–	15	.063	4	–	23	.148
† Conference tournament winner

1990–91 Big South Conference men's basketball standings
	Conf.				Overall
Team	W		L	PCT	W		L	PCT
Coastal Carolina †	13	–	1	.929	24	–	8	.750
Radford	12	–	2	.857	22	–	7	.759
Augusta State	9	–	5	.643	14	–	16	.467
Davidson	6	–	8	.429	10	–	19	.345
Winthrop	5	–	9	.357	8	–	20	.286
UNC Asheville	4	–	10	.286	8	–	20	.286
Charleston Southern	4	–	10	.286	9	–	19	.321
Campbell	3	–	11	.214	9	–	19	.321
† 1991 Big South tournament winner Rankings from AP Poll

1990–91 Big Ten Conference men's basketball standings
	Conf.				Overall
Team	W		L	PCT	W		L	PCT
No. 5 Ohio State	15	–	3	.833	27	–	4	.871
No. 3 Indiana	15	–	3	.833	29	–	5	.853
Illinois	11	–	7	.611	21	–	10	.677
Michigan State	11	–	7	.611	19	–	11	.633
Iowa	9	–	9	.500	21	–	11	.656
Purdue	9	–	9	.500	17	–	12	.586
Wisconsin	8	–	10	.444	15	–	15	.500
Michigan	7	–	11	.389	14	–	15	.483
Minnesota	5	–	13	.278	12	–	16	.429
Northwestern	0	–	18	.000	5	–	23	.179
Rankings from AP Poll

1990–91 Big West men's basketball standings
	Conf.				Overall
Team	W		L	PCT	W		L	PCT
No. 1 UNLV	18	–	0	1.000	34	–	1	.971
No. 15 New Mexico State	15	–	3	.833	23	–	6	.793
Pacific	9	–	9	.500	14	–	15	.483
UC Santa Barbara	8	–	10	.444	14	–	15	.483
Utah State	8	–	10	.444	11	–	17	.393
Cal State Fullerton	7	–	11	.389	14	–	14	.500
Fresno State	7	–	11	.389	14	–	16	.467
Long Beach State	7	–	11	.389	11	–	17	.393
UC Irvine	6	–	12	.333	11	–	19	.367
San Jose State	5	–	13	.278	7	–	20	.259
† 1991 Big West tournament winner Rankings from AP poll

1990–91 CAA men's basketball standings
	Conf.				Overall
Team	W		L	PCT	W		L	PCT
James Madison	12	–	2	.857	19	–	10	.655
Richmond †	10	–	4	.714	22	–	10	.688
American	8	–	6	.571	15	–	14	.517
George Mason	8	–	6	.571	14	–	16	.467
UNC Wilmington	6	–	8	.429	11	–	17	.393
William & Mary	6	–	8	.429	13	–	15	.464
East Carolina	4	–	10	.286	12	–	16	.429
Navy	2	–	12	.143	8	–	21	.276
† 1991 CAA tournament winner Rankings from AP Poll

1990–91 East Coast Conference men's basketball standings
	Conf.				Overall
Team	W		L	PCT	W		L	PCT
Towson State †	10	–	2	.833	19	–	11	.633
Delaware	8	–	4	.667	16	–	13	.552
Hofstra	7	–	5	.583	14	–	14	.500
Drexel	7	–	5	.583	12	–	16	.429
Rider	4	–	8	.333	14	–	16	.467
UMBC	4	–	8	.333	7	–	22	.241
Central Connecticut State	2	–	10	.167	4	–	24	.143
† 1991 ECC tournament winner Rankings from AP poll

1990–91 Ivy League men's basketball standings
	Conf.				Overall
Team	W		L	PCT	W		L	PCT
No. 18 Princeton	14	–	0	1.000	24	–	3	.889
Yale	9	–	5	.643	15	–	11	.577
Cornell	6	–	8	.429	13	–	13	.500
Brown	6	–	8	.429	11	–	15	.423
Harvard	6	–	8	.429	9	–	17	.346
Penn	6	–	8	.429	9	–	17	.346
Columbia	5	–	9	.357	7	–	19	.269
Dartmouth	4	–	10	.286	9	–	17	.346
Rankings from AP Poll

1990–91 Metro Conference men's basketball standings
	Conf.				Overall
Team	W		L	PCT	W		L	PCT
No. 25 Southern Miss	10	–	4	.714	21	–	8	.724
Florida State †	9	–	5	.643	21	–	11	.656
Cincinnati	8	–	6	.571	18	–	12	.600
Tulane	7	–	7	.500	15	–	13	.536
Memphis	7	–	7	.500	17	–	15	.531
Virginia Tech	6	–	8	.429	13	–	16	.448
South Carolina	5	–	9	.357	20	–	13	.606
Louisville	4	–	10	.286	14	–	16	.467
† 1991 Metro Conference tournament winner Rankings from AP Poll

1990–91 MAAC men's basketball standings
	Conf.				Overall
Team	W		L	PCT	W		L	PCT
Siena	12	–	4	.750	25	–	10	.714
La Salle	12	–	4	.750	19	–	10	.655
Saint Peter's †	11	–	5	.688	24	–	7	.774
Iona	11	–	5	.688	17	–	13	.567
Manhattan	8	–	8	.500	13	–	15	.464
Niagara	6	–	10	.375	8	–	20	.286
Loyola (MD)	5	–	11	.313	12	–	16	.429
Fairfield	4	–	12	.250	8	–	20	.286
Canisius	3	–	13	.188	10	–	19	.345
† 1991 MAAC tournament winner Rankings from AP Poll

1990–91 Mid-American Conference men's basketball standings
	Conf.				Overall
Team	W		L	PCT	W		L	PCT
Eastern Michigan †	13	–	3	.813	26	–	7	.788
Miami (OH)	10	–	6	.625	16	–	12	.571
Ball State	10	–	6	.625	21	–	10	.677
Bowling Green	9	–	7	.563	17	–	13	.567
Ohio	9	–	7	.563	16	–	12	.571
Central Michigan	8	–	8	.500	14	–	14	.500
Toledo	7	–	9	.438	17	–	16	.515
Kent State	4	–	12	.250	10	–	18	.357
Western Michigan	2	–	14	.125	5	–	22	.185
† 1991 Mid-American Conference tournament winner Rankings from AP Poll

1990–91 Mid-Continent Conference men's basketball standings
	Conf.				Overall
Team	W		L	PCT	W		L	PCT
Northern Illinois	14	–	2	.875	25	–	6	.806
Wisconsin–Green Bay †	13	–	3	.813	24	–	7	.774
Eastern Illinois	10	–	6	.625	17	–	12	.586
Cleveland State	8	–	8	.500	12	–	16	.429
Northern Iowa	8	–	8	.500	13	–	19	.406
Western Illinois	6	–	10	.375	13	–	15	.464
Akron	6	–	10	.375	15	–	13	.536
Illinois–Chicago	5	–	11	.313	15	–	15	.500
Valparaiso	2	–	14	.125	5	–	22	.185
† 1991 Mid-Con Tournament winner Rankings from AP Poll

1990–91 MEAC men's basketball standings
	Conf.				Overall
Team	W		L	PCT	W		L	PCT
Coppin State	14	–	2	.875	19	–	11	.633
Delaware State	10	–	6	.625	19	–	11	.633
North Carolina A&T	10	–	6	.625	17	–	10	.630
South Carolina State	10	–	6	.625	13	–	15	.464
Florida A&M †	9	–	7	.563	17	–	14	.548
Howard	7	–	9	.438	8	–	20	.286
Morgan State	6	–	10	.375	7	–	22	.241
Maryland Eastern Shore	3	–	13	.188	5	–	23	.179
Bethune–Cookman	3	–	13	.188	5	–	24	.172
† 1991 MEAC tournament winner Rankings from AP Poll

1990–91 Midwestern Collegiate Conference men's basketball standings
	Conf.				Overall
Team	W		L	PCT	W		L	PCT
Xavier †	11	–	3	.786	22	–	10	.688
Butler	10	–	4	.714	18	–	11	.621
Saint Louis	8	–	6	.571	19	–	14	.576
Dayton	8	–	6	.571	14	–	15	.483
Evansville	7	–	7	.500	14	–	14	.500
Marquette	7	–	7	.500	11	–	18	.379
Loyola (IL)	3	–	11	.214	10	–	19	.345
Detroit Mercy	2	–	12	.143	9	–	19	.321
† 1991 MCC tournament winner Rankings from AP Poll

1990–91 Missouri Valley Conference men's basketball standings
	Conf.				Overall
Team	W		L	PCT	W		L	PCT
Creighton †	12	–	4	.750	24	–	8	.750
Southwest Missouri State	11	–	5	.688	22	–	12	.647
Tulsa	10	–	6	.625	18	–	12	.600
Indiana State	9	–	7	.563	14	–	14	.500
Southern Illinois	9	–	7	.563	18	–	14	.563
Wichita State	7	–	9	.438	14	–	17	.452
Bradley	6	–	10	.375	8	–	20	.286
Illinois State	4	–	12	.250	5	–	23	.179
Drake	4	–	12	.250	8	–	21	.276
† 1991 MVC tournament winner Rankings from AP Poll

1990–91 North Atlantic Conference men's basketball standings
	Conf.				Overall
Team	W		L	PCT	W		L	PCT
Northeastern †	8	–	2	.800	22	–	11	.667
Maine	7	–	3	.700	13	–	16	.448
Boston University	5	–	5	.500	11	–	18	.379
Vermont	5	–	5	.500	15	–	13	.536
Hartford	5	–	5	.500	13	–	16	.448
New Hampshire	0	–	10	.000	3	–	25	.107
† 1991 NAC tournament winner

1990–91 Northeast Conference men's basketball standings
	Conf.				Overall
Team	W		L	PCT	W		L	PCT
Saint Francis (PA)†	13	–	3	.813	24	–	8	.750
Fairleigh Dickinson	13	–	3	.813	22	–	9	.710
Robert Morris*	12	–	4	.750	17	–	11	.607
Monmouth	10	–	6	.625	19	–	8	.704
St. Francis (NY)	8	–	8	.500	15	–	14	.517
Mount St. Mary's*	6	–	10	.375	8	–	19	.296
Long Island	4	–	12	.250	10	–	18	.357
Marist	4	–	12	.250	6	–	22	.214
Wagner	2	–	14	.125	4	–	26	.133
† 1991 NEC tournament winner Rankings from AP Poll; *Ineligible for conference tournament

1990–91 Ohio Valley Conference men's basketball standings
	Conf.				Overall
Team	W		L	PCT	W		L	PCT
Murray State †	10	–	2	.833	24	–	9	.727
Eastern Kentucky	9	–	3	.750	19	–	10	.655
Tennessee Tech	6	–	6	.500	12	–	16	.429
Austin Peay	6	–	6	.500	15	–	14	.517
Middle Tennessee	6	–	6	.500	21	–	9	.700
Morehead State	4	–	8	.333	16	–	13	.552
Tennessee State	1	–	11	.083	5	–	23	.179
† 1991 OVC tournament winner

1990–91 Pacific-10 Conference men's basketball standings
	Conf.				Overall
Team	W		L	PCT	W		L	PCT
No. 8 Arizona	14	–	4	.778	28	–	7	.800
No. 16 UCLA	11	–	7	.611	23	–	9	.719
Arizona State	10	–	8	.556	20	–	10	.667
USC	10	–	8	.556	19	–	10	.655
Stanford	8	–	10	.444	20	–	13	.606
Washington State	8	–	10	.444	16	–	12	.571
Oregon State	8	–	10	.444	14	–	14	.500
Oregon	8	–	10	.444	13	–	15	.464
California	8	–	10	.444	13	–	15	.464
Washington	5	–	13	.278	14	–	14	.500
As of April 15, 1991; Rankings from AP Poll

1990–91 Patriot League men's basketball standings
	Conf.				Overall
Team	W		L	PCT	W		L	PCT
Fordham †	11	–	1	.917	25	–	8	.758
Lehigh	10	–	2	.833	19	–	10	.655
Holy Cross	8	–	4	.667	18	–	12	.600
Bucknell	7	–	5	.583	18	–	13	.581
Army	3	–	9	.250	6	–	22	.214
Colgate	2	–	10	.167	5	–	23	.179
Lafayette	1	–	11	.083	7	–	21	.250
† 1991 Patriot League tournament winner

1990–91 Southeastern Conference men's basketball standings
	Conf.				Overall
Team	W		L	PCT	W		L	PCT
No. 9 Kentucky	14	–	4	.778	22	–	6	.786
No. 21 Mississippi State	13	–	5	.722	20	–	9	.690
No. 22 LSU	13	–	5	.722	20	–	10	.667
No. 19 Alabama †	12	–	6	.667	23	–	10	.697
Vanderbilt	11	–	7	.611	17	–	13	.567
Georgia	9	–	9	.500	17	–	13	.567
Florida	7	–	11	.389	11	–	17	.393
Auburn	5	–	13	.278	13	–	16	.448
Ole Miss	3	–	15	.167	9	–	19	.321
Tennessee	3	–	15	.167	12	–	22	.353
† 1991 SEC tournament winner Rankings from AP poll

1990–91 Southern Conference men's basketball standings
	Conf.				Overall
Team	W		L	PCT	W		L	PCT
Furman	11	–	3	.786	20	–	9	.690
No. 17 East Tennessee State†	11	–	3	.786	28	–	5	.848
Chattanooga	11	–	3	.786	19	–	10	.655
Appalachian State	7	–	7	.500	16	–	14	.533
Marshall	7	–	7	.500	14	–	14	.500
VMI	5	–	9	.357	10	–	18	.357
Western Carolina	3	–	11	.214	11	–	17	.393
The Citadel	1	–	13	.071	6	–	22	.214
† 1991 SoCon Tournament winner As of April 30, 1991; Rankings from AP poll

1990–91 Southland Conference men's basketball standings
	Conf.				Overall
Team	W		L	PCT	W		L	PCT
NE Louisiana †	13	–	1	.929	25	–	8	.758
UT Arlington	11	–	3	.786	20	–	9	.690
North Texas State	11	–	3	.786	17	–	13	.567
Stephen F. Austin	6	–	8	.429	11	–	17	.393
Sam Houston State	5	–	9	.357	7	–	20	.259
Southwest Texas State	4	–	10	.286	10	–	17	.370
McNeese State	4	–	10	.286	8	–	19	.296
Northwestern State	2	–	12	.143	6	–	22	.214
† 1991 Southland Conference tournament winner Rankings from AP Poll

1990–91 Southwest Conference men's basketball standings
	Conf.				Overall
Team	W		L	PCT	W		L	PCT
No. 2 Arkansas †	15	–	1	.938	34	–	4	.895
No. 23 Texas	13	–	3	.813	23	–	9	.719
Houston	10	–	6	.625	18	–	11	.621
TCU	9	–	7	.563	18	–	10	.643
Rice	9	–	7	.563	16	–	14	.533
SMU	6	–	10	.375	12	–	17	.414
Baylor	4	–	12	.250	12	–	15	.444
Texas Tech	4	–	12	.250	8	–	23	.258
Texas A&M	2	–	14	.125	8	–	21	.276
† 1991 SWC tournament winner Rankings from AP Poll

1990–91 SWAC men's basketball standings
	Conf.				Overall
Team	W		L	PCT	W		L	PCT
Jackson State †	10	–	2	.833	17	–	13	.567
Southern	8	–	4	.667	19	–	9	.679
Alabama State	7	–	5	.583	18	–	11	.621
Texas Southern	7	–	5	.583	13	–	17	.433
Mississippi Valley State	4	–	8	.333	9	–	19	.321
Alcorn State	3	–	9	.250	8	–	21	.276
Grambling	3	–	9	.250	6	–	22	.214
Prairie View A&M	0	–	0	–	4	–	21	.160
† 1991 SWAC tournament winner Rankings from AP Poll

1990–91 Sun Belt Conference men's basketball standings
	Conf.				Overall
Team	W		L	PCT	W		L	PCT
South Alabama †	11	–	3	.786	22	–	9	.710
UAB	9	–	5	.643	18	–	13	.581
South Florida	8	–	6	.571	19	–	11	.633
Western Kentucky	8	–	6	.571	14	–	14	.500
VCU	7	–	7	.500	14	–	17	.452
Old Dominion	5	–	9	.357	14	–	18	.438
UNC Charlotte	6	–	8	.429	14	–	14	.500
Jacksonville	2	–	12	.143	6	–	22	.214
† 1991 Sun Belt Conference tournament winner Rankings from AP Poll

1990–91 Trans America Athletic Conference men's basketball standings
	Conf.				Overall
Team	W		L	PCT	W		L	PCT
UTSA	12	–	2	.857	21	–	8	.724
Centenary	10	–	4	.714	17	–	12	.586
Georgia Southern	9	–	5	.643	14	–	13	.519
Stetson	9	–	5	.643	15	–	16	.484
Georgia State †	7	–	7	.500	16	–	15	.516
Arkansas–Little Rock	6	–	8	.429	10	–	20	.333
Samford	2	–	12	.143	6	–	22	.214
Mercer	1	–	13	.071	2	–	25	.074
† 1991 TAAC tournament winner Rankings from AP Poll

1990–91 West Coast Conference men's basketball standings
	Conf.				Overall
Team	W		L	PCT	W		L	PCT
Pepperdine †	13	–	1	.929	22	–	9	.710
Loyola Marymount	9	–	5	.643	16	–	15	.516
San Diego	8	–	6	.571	17	–	12	.586
Saint Mary's	7	–	7	.500	13	–	17	.433
Santa Clara	7	–	7	.500	16	–	13	.552
Gonzaga	5	–	9	.357	14	–	14	.500
San Francisco	4	–	10	.286	12	–	17	.414
Portland	3	–	11	.214	5	–	23	.179
† Conference tournament winner Rankings from AP poll

1990–91 WAC men's basketball standings
	Conf.				Overall
Team	W		L	PCT	W		L	PCT
No. 10 Utah	15	–	1	.938	30	–	4	.882
BYU †	11	–	5	.688	21	–	13	.618
New Mexico	10	–	6	.625	20	–	10	.667
Wyoming	8	–	8	.500	20	–	12	.625
UTEP	7	–	9	.438	16	–	13	.552
Hawaii	7	–	9	.438	16	–	13	.552
Colorado State	6	–	10	.375	15	–	14	.517
San Diego State	6	–	10	.375	13	–	16	.448
Air Force	2	–	14	.125	9	–	20	.310
† 1991 WAC tournament winner Rankings from AP Poll

=== Division I independents ===
A total of 17 college teams played as Division I independents. Among them, DePaul (20–9) had both the best winning percentage (.690) and the most wins.

1990–91 NCAA Division I men's basketball independents standings
	Conf.				Overall
Team	W		L	PCT	W		L	PCT
No. 24 DePaul	-	–	-	–	20	–	9	.690
Wright State	-	–	-	–	19	–	9	.679
Milwaukee	-	–	-	–	18	–	10	.643
Southern Utah	-	–	-	–	16	–	12	.571
Missouri–Kansas City	-	–	-	–	15	–	14	.517
Youngstown State	-	–	-	–	12	–	16	.429
Brooklyn	-	–	-	–	11	–	16	.407
Notre Dame	-	–	-	–	12	–	20	.375
Miami (FL)	-	–	-	–	9	–	19	.321
Southeastern Louisiana	-	–	-	–	9	–	19	.321
Cal State Northridge	-	–	-	–	8	–	20	.286
Florida International	-	–	-	–	6	–	22	.214
Liberty	-	–	-	–	5	–	23	.179
Chicago State	-	–	-	–	4	–	24	.143
Nicholls State	-	–	-	–	3	–	25	.107
Northeastern Illinois	-	–	-	–	2	–	25	.074
US International	-	–	-	–	2	–	26	.071
Rankings from AP Poll

=== Informal championships ===
Conference	Regular season winner	Most Valuable Player
Philadelphia Big 5	Saint Joseph's & Temple	Mark Macon, Temple

Saint Joseph's and Temple both finished with 3–1 records in head-to-head competition among the Philadelphia Big 5. After this season, the Big 5 dropped its full round-robin schedule in which each team met each other team once, which it had used since its first season of competition in 1955–56. Instead, each team played only two games against other Big 5 members from the 1991–92 season through the 1998–99 season. The Big 5 did not revive its full round-robin schedule until 1999–2000 season.

=== Statistical leaders ===
Points per game			Rebounds per game			Assists per game			Steals per game		
Player	School	PPG	Player	School	RPG	Player	School	APG	Player	School	SPG
Kevin Bradshaw	US International	37.6	Shaquille O'Neal	LSU	14.7	Chris Corchiani	NC State	9.6	Van Usher	Tenn. Tech	3.7
Alphonso Ford	Miss. Valley St.	32.7	Popeye Jones	Murray St.	14.2	Danny Tirado	Jacksonville	9.3	Scott Burrell	Connecticut	3.6
Von McDade	UW–Milwaukee	29.6	Larry Stewart	Coppin St.	13.4	Terrell Lowery	Loyola Marymount	9.1	Eric Murdock	Providence	3.5
Steve Rogers	Alabama St.	29.4	Tim Burroughs	Jacksonville	13.0	Keith Jennings	E. Tenn. St.	9.1	Von McDade	UW–Milwaukee	3.5
Terrell Lowery	Loyola Marymount	28.5	Warren Kidd	Middle Tenn St.	12.3	Greg Anthony	UNLV	8.9	Lynn Smith	St. Francis (NY)	3.4

Blocked shots per game			Field goal percentage			Three-point field goal percentage			Free throw percentage		
Player	School	BPG	Player	School	FG%	Player	School	3FG%	Player	School	FT%
Shawn Bradley	BYU	5.2	Oliver Miller	Arkansas	.704	Keith Jennings	E. Tenn St.	.592	Darin Archbold	Butler	.912
Cedric Lewis	Maryland	5.1	Warren Kidd	Middle Tenn. St.	.700	Tony Bennett	UW–Green Bay	.533	William Lewis	Monmouth	.901
Shaquille O'Neal	LSU	5.0	Pete Freeman	Akron	.700	Mike Iuzzolino	St. Francis (PA)	.528	Darwyn Alexander	Oklahoma St.	.897
Dikembe Mutombo	Georgetown	4.7	Lester James	St. Francis (NY)	.693	Ross Richardson	Loyola Marymount	.526	Keith Jennings	E. Tenn. St.	.895
Kevin Roberson	Vermont	3.7	Marcus Kennedy	E. Michigan	.692	David Mitchell	Samford	.526	Rodney Monroe	NC State	.895

== Postseason tournaments ==
=== NCAA tournament ===
==== Final Four - Hoosier Dome, Indianapolis, Indiana ====
National Semifinals
E1	North Carolina	73
S3	Kansas	79
M2	Duke	79
W1	UNLV	77

National Championship Game
S3	Kansas	65
M2	Duke	72

=== National Invitation tournament ===
==== NIT Semifinals and Final ====
Semifinals
Oklahoma	88
Colorado	78
Massachusetts	71
Stanford	78

Finals
Oklahoma	72
Stanford	78

Third place game
Colorado	98
Massachusetts	91

== Award winners ==
=== Consensus All-American teams ===
Consensus First Team
Player	Position	Class	Team
Kenny Anderson	G	Sophomore	Georgia Tech
Jimmy Jackson	G/F	Sophomore	Ohio State
Larry Johnson	F	Senior	UNLV
Shaquille O'Neal	C	Sophomore	Louisiana State
Billy Owens	F	Junior	Syracuse

Consensus Second Team
Player	Position	Class	Team
Stacey Augmon	F	Senior	UNLV
Keith Jennings	G	Senior	East Tennessee State
Christian Laettner	F	Junior	Duke
Eric Murdock	G	Senior	Providence
Steve Smith	G	Senior	Michigan State

=== Major player of the year awards ===
- Wooden Award: Larry Johnson, UNLV
- Naismith Award: Larry Johnson, UNLV
- Associated Press Player of the Year: Shaquille O'Neal, LSU
- UPI Player of the Year: Shaquille O'Neal, LSU
- NABC Player of the Year: Larry Johnson, UNLV
- Oscar Robertson Trophy (USBWA): Larry Johnson, UNLV
- Adolph Rupp Trophy: Shaquille O'Neal, LSU
- Sporting News Player of the Year: Larry Johnson, UNLV

=== Major coach of the year awards ===
- Associated Press Coach of the Year: Randy Ayers, Ohio State
- UPI Coach of the Year: Rick Majerus, Utah
- Henry Iba Award (USBWA): Randy Ayers, Ohio State
- NABC Coach of the Year: Mike Krzyzewski, Duke
- Naismith College Coach of the Year: Randy Ayers, Ohio State
- CBS/Chevrolet Coach of the Year: Randy Ayers, Ohio State
- Sporting News Coach of the Year: Rick Pitino, Kentucky

=== Other major awards ===
- Frances Pomeroy Naismith Award (Best player under 6'0): Keith Jennings, East Tennessee State
- Robert V. Geasey Trophy (Top player in Philadelphia Big 5): Mark Macon, Temple
- NIT/Haggerty Award (Top player in New York City metro area): Malik Sealy, St. John's
- USBWA National Freshman of the Year: Rodney Rogers, Wake Forest

== Coaching changes ==
A number of teams changed coaches during the season and after it ended.

Team	Former Coach	Interim Coach	New Coach	Reason
Bradley	Stan Albeck		Jim Molinari	
Brown	Mike Cingiser		Frank Dobbs	
Central Michigan	Charlie Coles		Keith Dambrot	
Colorado State	Boyd Grant		Stew Morrill	
Cornell	Mike Dement		Jan van Breda Kolff	
Creighton	Tony Barone		Rick Johnson	
Dartmouth	Paul Cormier		Dave Faucher	
Drexel	Eddie Burke		Bill Herrion	
East Carolina	Mike Steele		Eddie Payne	Payne became head coach after he was an assistant with South Carolina.
Fairfield	Mitch Buonaguro		Paul Cormier	
Harvard	Peter Roby		Frank Sullivan	
Iona	Gary Brokaw		Jerry Welsh	
Jacksonville	Rich Haddad		Matt Kilcullen	
Mercer	Brad Siegfried		Bill Hodges	
Middle Tennessee State	Bruce Stewart		David Farrar	
Montana	Stew Morrill		Blaine Taylor	Morrill left to coach Colorado State.
Morehead State	Tommy Gaither		Dick Fick	
Murray State	Steve Newton		Scott Edgar	
Northern Illinois	Jim Molinari		Brian Hammel	Molinari left to coach Bradley.
Notre Dame	Digger Phelps		John MacLeod	
Old Dominion	Tom Young		Oliver Purnell	Purnell returns to hs alma mater.
Radford	Oliver Purnell		Ron Bradley	
Saint Mary's	Paul Landreaux	Dave Fehte	Ernie Kent	
Sam Houston State	Larry Brown		Jerry Hopkins	
Samford	Ed McLean		John Brady	
South Carolina	George Felton		Steve Newton	
Tennessee State	Ron Abernathy		Frankie Allen	
Texas A&M	Kermit Davis		Tony Barone	
Texas Tech	Gerald Myers		James Dickey	Myers resigned as head coach and became assistant athletic director. Dickey was an assistant coach under Myers.
Toledo	Jay Eck		Larry Gipson	
Tulsa	J. D. Barnett		Tubby Smith	Smith was an assistant at Kentucky.
UC Irvine	Bill Mulligan		Rod Baker	
UNC Greensboro	Bob McEvoy		Mike Dement	
Virginia Tech	Frankie Allen		Bill Foster	Allen left to coach Tennessee State.
Weber State	Denny Huston		Ron Abegglen	
