= 1990–91 UCLA Bruins men's basketball team =

American college basketball season

1990–91 UCLA Bruins men's basketball

Great Alaska Shootout champions

NCAA tournament, Round of 64
- Conference: Pacific-10

Ranking
- Coaches: No. 14
- AP: No. 16
- Record: 23–9 (11–7, 2nd Pac-10)
- Head coach: Jim Harrick (3rd season)
- Assistant coaches: Brad Holland; Mark Gottfried; Ken Barone
- Home arena: Pauley Pavilion

1990–91 Pacific-10 Conference men's basketball standings
| | Conf. | | | | Overall |
| Team | W | | L | PCT | W | | L | PCT |
|---|---|---|---|---|---|---|---|---|
| No. 8 Arizona | 14 | – | 4 | .778 | 28 | – | 7 | .800 |
| No. 16 UCLA | 11 | – | 7 | .611 | 23 | – | 9 | .719 |
| Arizona State | 10 | – | 8 | .556 | 20 | – | 10 | .667 |
| USC | 10 | – | 8 | .556 | 19 | – | 10 | .655 |
| Stanford | 8 | – | 10 | .444 | 20 | – | 13 | .606 |
| Washington State | 8 | – | 10 | .444 | 16 | – | 12 | .571 |
| Oregon State | 8 | – | 10 | .444 | 14 | – | 14 | .500 |
| Oregon | 8 | – | 10 | .444 | 13 | – | 15 | .464 |
| California | 8 | – | 10 | .444 | 13 | – | 15 | .464 |
| Washington | 5 | – | 13 | .278 | 14 | – | 14 | .500 |
As of April 15, 1991; Rankings from AP Poll

The 1990–91 UCLA Bruins men's basketball team represented the University of California, Los Angeles in the 1990–91 NCAA Division I men's basketball season. Jim Harrick, for the third year, was the head coach for the Bruins. The Bruins started the season ranked 11th in the AP Poll and won their first 8 games. They finished in 2nd place in the Pac-10 with the same conference record as the previous year, 11–7. UCLA went on to the NCAA tournament, where they upset by Penn State 74–69. UCLA finished ranked 14th and 16th in the UPI and AP Polls respectively.

== Starting lineup ==
| Position | Player | Class |
|---|---|---|
| F | Don MacLean | Jr. |
| F | Tracy Murray | So. |
| F | Mitchell Butler | So. |
| G | Darrick Martin | Jr. |
| G | Gerald Madkins | Jr. |

== Roster ==
1990–91 UCLA Bruins men's basketball team
Players
Coaches

| Pos. | # | Name | Height | Weight | Year | Hometown |
|---|---|---|---|---|---|---|
| F | 23 | Mitchell Butler | 6 ft 5 in (1.96 m) | — | So | Los Angeles, California |
| G | 22 | Chris Kenny | 6 ft 3 in (1.91 m) | — | Jr |
| F | 42 | Don MacLean | 6 ft 10 in (2.08 m) | — | Jr | Palo Alto, California |
| G | 12 | Gerald Madkins | 6 ft 3 in (1.91 m) | — | Jr | Merced, California |
| G | 15 | Darrick Martin | 5 ft 11 in (1.8 m) | — | Jr | Denver, Colorado |
| F | 44 | Zan Mason | 6 ft 7 in (2.01 m) | — | So |
| F | 30 | Tracy Murray | 6 ft 8 in (2.03 m) | — | So | Los Angeles, California |
| F | | Destah Owens | 6 ft 7 in (2.01 m) | — | Fr |
| C | 25 | Keith Owens | 6 ft 7 in (2.01 m) | — | Sr | San Francisco, California |
| G | | Dave Paulsell | 6 ft 3 in (1.91 m) | — | Jr |
| G | | Lou Richie | 5 ft 9 in (1.75 m) | — | Fr |
| G | 21 | Shon Tarver | 6 ft 5 in (1.96 m) | — | Fr |
| G | 10 | John Woolery | 6 ft 0 in (1.83 m) | — | Fr |
| C | 14 | Rodney Zimmerman | 6 ft 10 in (2.08 m) | — | Fr |

Head coach

Jim Harrick (Morris Harvey College)

Assistant coach(es)

Legend

- (C) Team captain
- (S) Suspended
- (I) Ineligible
- (W) Walk-on
- Injured
- Current redshirt

Roster

== Schedule ==
| Date time, TV | Rank^{#} | Opponent^{#} | Result | Record | Site city, state |
Great Alaska Shootout
| November 23, 1990 | No. 11 | vs. UC Irvine; Quarterfinals | W 134–101 | 1–0 | Sullivan Arena (7,947); Anchorage, AK |
| November 24, 1990 | No. 11 | at Alaska Anchorage; Semifinals | W 80–67 | 2–0 | Sullivan Arena (7,947); Anchorage, AK |
| November 26, 1990 | No. 11 | vs. No. 18 Virginia; Finals | W 89–74 | 3–0 | Sullivan Arena (6,287); Anchorage, AK |
Regular Season
| December 2, 1990 | No. 12 | Loyola Marymount | W 149–98 | 4–0 | Pauley Pavilion (12,267); Los Angeles, CA |
| December 5, 1990 | No. 8 | St. Mary's | W 123–93 | 5–0 | Pauley Pavilion (5,887); Los Angeles, CA |
| December 8, 1990 | No. 8 | Notre Dame | W 99–91 | 6–0 | Pauley Pavilion (12,518); Los Angeles, CA |
| December 15, 1990 | No. 6 | at DePaul | W 92–90 | 7–0 | Rosemont Horizon (10,254); Chicago, IL |
| December 19, 1990 | No. 5 | Pepperdine | W 108–85 | 8–0 | Pauley Pavilion (7,881); Los Angeles, CA |
| December 22, 1990 | No. 5 | at Iowa | L 71–88 | 8–1 | Carver–Hawkeye Arena (15,500); Iowa City, IA |
| December 27, 1990 | No. 10 | Fresno State | W 110–89 | 9–1 | Pauley Pavilion (8,667); Los Angeles, CA |
| December 29, 1990 | No. 10 | San Diego State | W 94–74 | 10–1 | Pauley Pavilion (9,419); Los Angeles, CA |
| January 2, 1991 | No. 10 | USC | W 98–81 | 11–1 (1–0) | Pauley Pavilion (12,688); Los Angeles, CA |
| January 5, 1991 | No. 10 | Louisville | W 88–81 | 12–1 | Pauley Pavilion (12,313); Los Angeles, CA |
| January 10, 1991 | No. 7 | at Arizona State | W 82–68 | 13–1 (2–0) | ASU Activity Center (12,762); Tempe, AZ |
| January 12, 1991 | No. 7 | at No. 6 Arizona | L 77–82 | 13–2 (2–1) | McKale Center (13,864); Tucson, AZ |
| January 16, 1991 | No. 7 | Stanford | L 82–89 | 13–3 (2–2) | Pauley Pavilion (7,278); Los Angeles, CA |
| January 20, 1991 | No. 7 | California | W 98–81 | 14–3 (3–2) | Pauley Pavilion (6,829); Los Angeles, CA |
| January 24, 1991 | No. 11 | at Oregon State | L 96–97 ^{2OT} | 14–4 (3–3) | Gill Coliseum (9,628); Corvallis, OR |
| January 26, 1991 | No. 11 | at Oregon | W 90–83 | 15–4 (4–3) | McArthur Court (9,363); Eugene, OR |
| January 30, 1991 | No. 12 | at USC | L 74–76 | 15–5 (4–4) | Los Angeles Memorial Sports Arena (9,125); Los Angeles, CA |
| February 2, 1991 | No. 12 | No. 19 Pittsburgh | W 112–85 | 16–5 | Pauley Pavilion (12,053); Los Angeles, CA |
| February 7, 1991 | No. 14 | Arizona State | W 64–44 | 17–5 (5–4) | Pauley Pavilion (11,213); Los Angeles, CA |
| February 10, 1991 | No. 14 | No. 5 Arizona | L 94–105 ^{OT} | 17–6 (5–5) | Pauley Pavilion (12,823); Los Angeles, CA |
| February 14, 1991 | No. 15 | at California | L 79–82 | 17–7 (5–6) | Harmon Gym (6,578); Berkeley, CA |
| February 16, 1991 | No. 15 | at Stanford | W 89–86 | 18–7 (6–6) | Maples Pavilion (7,500); Stanford, CA |
| February 21, 1991 | No. 17 | Oregon | W 100–83 | 19–7 (7–6) | Pauley Pavilion (9,122); Los Angeles, CA |
| February 23, 1991 | No. 17 | Oregon State | W 87–56 | 20–7 (8–6) | Pauley Pavilion (10,618); Los Angeles, CA |
| February 28, 1991 | No. 16 | at Washington State | W 99–91 | 21–7 (9–6) | Beasley Coliseum (9,264); Pullman, WA |
| March 3, 1991 | No. 16 | at Washington | L 68–86 | 21–8 (9–7) | Hec Edmundson Pavilion (4,213); Seattle, WA |
| March 7, 1991 | No. 17 | Washington State | W 86–64 | 22–8 (10–7) | Pauley Pavilion (8,354); Los Angeles, CA |
| March 10, 1991 | No. 17 | Washington | W 73–60 | 23–8 (11–7) | Pauley Pavilion (10,454); Los Angeles, CA |
NCAA tournament
| March 18, 1991 | No. 16 | vs. Penn State; First Round | L 69–74 | 23–9 | Carrier Dome (14,436); Syracuse, NY |
*Non-conference game. ^{#}Rankings from AP Poll. (#) Tournament seedings in parentheses. All times are in Pacific Time.
