= 1993–94 Pepperdine Waves men's basketball team =

American college basketball season

1993–94 Pepperdine Waves men's basketball

WCC tournament champions

NCAA tournament
- Conference: West Coast Conference
- Record: 19–11 (8–6 WCC)
- Head coach: Tom Asbury (6th season)
- Home arena: Firestone Fieldhouse

1993–94 West Coast Conference men's basketball standings
	Conf.				Overall
Team	W		L	PCT	W		L	PCT
Gonzaga	12	–	2	.857	22	–	8	.733
Pepperdine †	8	–	6	.571	19	–	11	.633
San Francisco	8	–	6	.571	17	–	11	.607
San Diego	7	–	7	.500	18	–	11	.621
Portland	6	–	8	.429	13	–	17	.433
Santa Clara	6	–	8	.429	13	–	14	.481
Saint Mary's	5	–	9	.357	13	–	14	.481
Loyola Marymount	4	–	10	.286	6	–	21	.222
† Conference tournament winner Rankings from AP poll

The 1993–94 Pepperdine Waves men's basketball team represented Pepperdine University in the 1993–94 NCAA Division I men's basketball season. The team was led by head coach Tom Asbury. The Waves played their home games at the Firestone Fieldhouse and were members of the West Coast Conference. They finished the season 19–11, 8–6 in WCC play to finish in second place in the conference standings. Pepperdine then won the West Coast Conference tournament to secure the conference's automatic bid to the NCAA tournament for the second straight season. In the opening round, the Waves fell to Michigan, 78–74 in OT.

== Roster ==
1993–94 Pepperdine Waves men's basketball team
Players
Coaches

Pos.	#	Name	Height	Weight	Year	Previous school	Hometown
F	10	Steve Guild	6 ft 6 in (1.98 m)	—	Sr	Marina	Huntington Beach, California
G	12	Damin Lopez	5 ft 9 in (1.75 m)	—	RS Sr	Apollo	Glendale, Arizona
F	21	Dana Jones	6 ft 7 in (2.01 m)	—	Sr	North Hollywood	Los Angeles, California
C	52	Derek Noether	6 ft 8 in (2.03 m)	—	Sr	Clovis West	Fresno, California

Head coach

- Tom Asbury (Wyoming)

Assistant coach(es)

Legend

- (C) Team captain
- (S) Suspended
- (I) Ineligible
- (W) Walk-on
- Injured
- Current redshirt

== Schedule and results ==
Date time, TV	Rank^{#}	Opponent^{#}	Result	Record	Site (attendance) city, state
Non-conference regular season
Dec 18, 1993*		at No. 23 George Washington	L 59–66	5–2	Charles E. Smith Center; Washington, D.C.
Dec 22, 1993*		at UC Santa Barbara	W 70–57	6–2	The Thunderdome; Santa Barbara, California
Dec 29, 1993*		at UTEP; Sierra Medical Center Sun Classic	L 58–60	6–3	Don Haskins Center; El Paso, Texas
Dec 30, 1993*		vs. Iowa State; Sierra Medical Center Sun Classic	L 64–71	6–4	Don Haskins Center; El Paso, Texas
WCC Regular Season
Jan 14, 1994		Santa Clara	L 51–54	8–5 (0–1)	Firestone Fieldhouse; Malibu, California
Feb 26, 1994		at Santa Clara	W 65–52	16–10 (8–6)	Toso Pavilion; Santa Clara, California
WCC tournament
Mar 5, 1994*		vs. Saint Mary's; Quarterfinals	W 79–62	17–10	Toso Pavilion; Santa Clara, California
Mar 6, 1994*		vs. San Francisco; Semifinals	W 82–79	18–10	Toso Pavilion; Santa Clara, California
Mar 7, 1994*		vs. San Diego; Championship game	W 56–53	19–10	Toso Pavilion; Santa Clara, California
NCAA tournament
Mar 17, 1994*	(14 MW)	vs. (3 MW) No. 11 Michigan; First round	L 74–78 ^{OT}	19–11	Kansas Coliseum; Wichita, Kansas
*Non-conference game. ^{#}Rankings from AP Poll. (#) Tournament seedings in parentheses. MW=Midwest.
