= 1990–91 Arizona State Sun Devils men's basketball team =

American college basketball season

1990–91 Arizona State Sun Devils men's basketball

NCAA tournament, second round
- Conference: Pacific-10
- Record: 20–10 (10–8 Pac-10)
- Head coach: Bill Frieder (2nd season)
- Home arena: ASU Activity Center

1990–91 Pacific-10 Conference men's basketball standings
	Conf.				Overall
Team	W		L	PCT	W		L	PCT
No. 8 Arizona	14	–	4	.778	28	–	7	.800
No. 16 UCLA	11	–	7	.611	23	–	9	.719
Arizona State	10	–	8	.556	20	–	10	.667
USC	10	–	8	.556	19	–	10	.655
Stanford	8	–	10	.444	20	–	13	.606
Washington State	8	–	10	.444	16	–	12	.571
Oregon State	8	–	10	.444	14	–	14	.500
Oregon	8	–	10	.444	13	–	15	.464
California	8	–	10	.444	13	–	15	.464
Washington	5	–	13	.278	14	–	14	.500
As of April 15, 1991; Rankings from AP Poll

The 1990–91 Arizona State Sun Devils men's basketball team represented Arizona State University as a member of the Pacific-10 Conference during the 1990–91 NCAA Division I men's basketball season. They were led by head coach Bill Frieder, in his 2nd season, and played their home games at the ASU Activity Center in Tempe, Arizona.

== Roster ==
1990–91 Arizona State Sun Devils men's basketball team
Players
Coaches

Pos.	#	Name	Height	Weight	Year	Previous school	Hometown
F		Jamal Faulkner	6 ft 7 in (2.01 m)	210 lb (95 kg)	Fr	Christ the King HS	Brooklyn, NY
G	44	Stevin Smith	6 ft 1 in (1.85 m)	185 lb (84 kg)	Fr	H. Grady Spruce HS	Dallas, TX
C	50	Isaac Austin	6 ft 10 in (2.08 m)	260 lb (118 kg)	Sr	Las Plumas HS; Reedley College	Oroville, CA

Head coach

- Bill Frieder (Michigan)

Assistant coach(es)

Legend

- (C) Team captain
- (S) Suspended
- (I) Ineligible
- (W) Walk-on
- Injured
- Current redshirt

== Schedule and results ==
Date time, TV	Rank^{#}	Opponent^{#}	Result	Record	Site city, state
Non-conference regular season
Nov 23, 1990*		Kansas	W 70–68	1–0	ASU Activity Center; Tempe, Arizona
Nov 24, 1990*		Southern Methodist	W 89–79	2–0	ASU Activity Center; Tempe, Arizona
Nov 29, 1990*		Northern Arizona	W 118–77	3–0	ASU Activity Center; Tempe, Arizona
Dec 1, 1990*		Drake	L 93–94	3–1	ASU Activity Center; Tempe, Arizona
Dec 5, 1990*		New Mexico	W 59–54	4–1	ASU Activity Center; Tempe, Arizona
Dec 12, 1990*		at Brigham Young	W 82–74	5–1	Marriott Center; Provo, Utah
Dec 21, 1990*		Southern Utah	W 100–71	6–1	ASU Activity Center; Tempe, Arizona
Dec 22, 1990*		Montana State	W 107–74	7–1	ASU Activity Center; Tempe, Arizona
Dec 28, 1990*		Penn	W 94–62	8–1	ASU Activity Center; Tempe, Arizona
Dec 29, 1990*		Texas	W 89–82	9–1	ASU Activity Center; Tempe, Arizona
Pac-10 Regular Season
Jan 3, 1991		at Washington State	L 86–95	9–2 (0–1)	Friel Court; Pullman, Washington
Jan 10, 1991		No. 7 UCLA	L 68–82	10–3 (1–2)	ASU Activity Center (12,762); Tempe, Arizona
Jan 12, 1991		USC	W 84–80 ^{OT}	11–3 (2–2)	Wells Fargo Arena; Tempe, Arizona
Jan 17, 1991		No. 6 Arizona	L 71–74	11–4 (2–3)	ASU Activity Center; Tempe, Arizona
Feb 7, 1991		at No. 14 UCLA	L 44–64	13–7	Pauley Pavilion (11,213); Los Angeles, California
Feb 9, 1991		at USC	W 88–83	14–7	L.A. Sports Arena; Los Angeles, California
Feb 13, 1991		at No. 6 Arizona	L 50–71	14–8	McKale Center; Tucson, Arizona
Mar 9, 1991		Oregon State	W 84–69	19–9 (10–8)	ASU Activity Center; Tempe, Arizona
NCAA Tournament
Mar 15, 1991*	(8 SE)	vs. (9 SE) Rutgers; First Round	W 79–76	20–9	The Omni; Atlanta, Georgia
Mar 17, 1991*	(8 SE)	vs. (1 SE) No. 2 Arkansas; Second Round	L 90–97	20–10	The Omni; Atlanta, Georgia
*Non-conference game. ^{#}Rankings from AP Poll. (#) Tournament seedings in parentheses. SE=Southeast.
