= 1990–91 Arizona Wildcats men's basketball team =

American college basketball season

1990–91 Arizona Wildcats men's basketball

Pacific-10 Regular-Season Champions Preseason NIT Champions

NCAA tournament, Sweet Sixteen
- Conference: Pacific-10 Conference

Ranking
- Coaches: No. 7
- AP: No. 8
- Record: 28–7 (14–4 Pac-10)
- Head coach: Lute Olson (8th season)
- Home arena: McKale Center (Capacity: 14,545)

1990–91 Pacific-10 Conference men's basketball standings
| | Conf. | | | | Overall |
| Team | W | | L | PCT | W | | L | PCT |
|---|---|---|---|---|---|---|---|---|
| No. 8 Arizona | 14 | – | 4 | .778 | 28 | – | 7 | .800 |
| No. 16 UCLA | 11 | – | 7 | .611 | 23 | – | 9 | .719 |
| Arizona State | 10 | – | 8 | .556 | 20 | – | 10 | .667 |
| USC | 10 | – | 8 | .556 | 19 | – | 10 | .655 |
| Stanford | 8 | – | 10 | .444 | 20 | – | 13 | .606 |
| Washington State | 8 | – | 10 | .444 | 16 | – | 12 | .571 |
| Oregon State | 8 | – | 10 | .444 | 14 | – | 14 | .500 |
| Oregon | 8 | – | 10 | .444 | 13 | – | 15 | .464 |
| California | 8 | – | 10 | .444 | 13 | – | 15 | .464 |
| Washington | 5 | – | 13 | .278 | 14 | – | 14 | .500 |
As of April 15, 1991; Rankings from AP Poll

The 1990–91 Arizona Wildcats men's basketball team represented the University of Arizona as a member of the Pacific-10 Conference during the 1990–91 NCAA Division I men's basketball season. Led by head coach Lute Olson, the team played its home games in the McKale Center in Tucson, Arizona. Arizona won the Pac-10 regular season title by 3 games over second-place UCLA.

== Roster ==
1990–91 Arizona Wildcats men's basketball team
Players
Coaches

| Pos. | # | Name | Height | Weight | Year | Previous school | Hometown |
|---|---|---|---|---|---|---|---|
| C | 45 | Sean Rooks | 6 ft 10 in (2.08 m) | 250 lb (113 kg) | Jr | Fontana HS | New York, NY |
| C | 21 | Brian Williams | 6 ft 9 in (2.06 m) | 235 lb (107 kg) | Sr | Saint Monica Catholic HS | Fresno, CA |
| PG | 12 | Matt Othick | 6 ft 2 in (1.88 m) | 165 lb (75 kg) | Jr | Bishop Gorman HS | Clovis, NM |
| C | 41 | Ed Stokes | 7 ft 0 in (2.13 m) | 250 lb (113 kg) | Fr | St. Bernard | Los Angeles, CA |

Head coach

- Lute Olson (Augsburg)

Assistant coach(es)

Legend

- (C) Team captain
- (S) Suspended
- (I) Ineligible
- (W) Walk-on
- Injured
- Current redshirt

== Schedule and results ==
| Date time, TV | Rank^{#} | Opponent^{#} | Result | Record | Site city, state |
Regular Season
| Nov 14, 1990* | No. 3 | Austin Peay; Preseason NIT | W 122–80 | 1–0 | McKale Center; Tucson, Arizona |
| Nov 16, 1990* | No. 3 | East Tennessee State; Preseason NIT | W 88–79 | 2–0 | McKale Center; Tucson, Arizona |
| Nov 21, 1990* | No. 3 | vs. Notre Dame; Preseason NIT | W 91–61 | 3–0 | Madison Square Garden; New York, NY |
| Nov 23, 1990* | No. 3 | vs. No. 2 Arkansas; Preseason NIT | W 89–77 | 4–0 | Madison Square Garden; New York, NY |
| Nov 26, 1990* | No. 3 | Western Illinois | W 90–51 | 5–0 | McKale Center; Tucson, Arizona |
| Dec 1, 1990* | No. 2 | Long Beach State | W 95–68 | 6–0 | McKale Center; Tucson, Arizona |
| Dec 5, 1990* | No. 2 | at Northern Arizona | W 100–64 | 7–0 | Walkup Skydome; Flagstaff, Arizona |
| Dec 8, 1990* | No. 2 | at No. 18 LSU | L 82–92 | 7–1 | Maravich Assembly Center; Baton Rouge, Louisiana |
| Dec 23, 1990* | No. 4 | Providence | W 99–87 | 8–1 | McKale Center; Tucson, Arizona |
| Dec 27, 1990* | No. 4 | Pepperdine; Fiesta Bowl Classic | W 80–66 | 9–1 | McKale Center; Tucson, Arizona |
| Dec 28, 1990* | No. 4 | Iowa State; Fiesta Bowl Classic | W 102–77 | 10–1 | McKale Center; Tucson, Arizona |
| Jan 3, 1991 | No. 4 | at Washington | L 56–70 | 10–2 (0–1) | Bank of America Arena; Seattle, Washington |
| Jan 5, 1991 | No. 4 | at Washington State | W 84–69 | 11–2 (1–1) | Friel Court; Pullman, Washington |
| Jan 10, 1991 | No. 6 | USC | W 87–85 | 12–2 (2–1) | McKale Center; Tucson, Arizona |
| Jan 12, 1991 | No. 6 | No. 7 UCLA | W 82–77 | 13–2 (3–1) | McKale Center; Tucson, Arizona |
| Jan 16, 1991 | No. 6 | at Arizona State | W 74–71 | 14–2 (4–1) | ASU Activity Center; Tempe, Arizona |
| Jan 19, 1991* | No. 6 | at Villanova | W 72–64 | 15–2 | The Pavilion; Philadelphia, Pennsylvania |
| Jan 24, 1991 | No. 5 | at Stanford | W 78–76 | 16–2 (5–1) | Maples Pavilion; Stanford, California |
| Jan 26, 1991 | No. 5 | at California | L 78–85 | 16–3 (5–2) | Harmon Gym; Berkeley, California |
| Jan 31, 1991 | No. 6 | Washington State | W 84–71 | 17–3 (6–2) | McKale Center; Tucson, Arizona |
| Feb 2, 1991 | No. 6 | Washington | W 85–56 | 18–3 (7–2) | McKale Center; Tucson, Arizona |
| Feb 7, 1991 | No. 5 | at USC | L 83–87 | 18–4 (7–3) | L.A. Sports Arena; Los Angeles, California |
| Feb 10, 1991 | No. 5 | at No. 14 UCLA | W 105–94 | 19–4 (8–3) | Pauley Pavilion; Los Angeles, California |
| Feb 13, 1991 | No. 6 | Arizona State | W 71–50 | 20–4 (9–3) | McKale Center; Tucson, Arizona |
| Feb 17, 1991* | No. 6 | vs. Georgia Tech | L 56–62 | 20–5 | Meadowlands Arena; East Rutherford, New Jersey |
| Feb 21, 1991 | No. 9 | California | W 100–63 | 21–5 (10–3) | McKale Center; Tucson, Arizona |
| Feb 24, 1991* | No. 9 | No. 7 Duke | W 103–96 ^{2OT} | 22–5 | McKale Center; Tucson, Arizona |
| Feb 26, 1991 | No. 7 | Stanford | W 89–51 | 23–5 (11–3) | McKale Center; Tucson, Arizona |
| Feb 28, 1991 | No. 7 | at Oregon State | W 103–65 | 24–5 (12–3) | Gill Coliseum; Corvallis, Oregon |
| Mar 2, 1991 | No. 7 | at Oregon | L 58–62 | 24–6 (12–4) | McArthur Court; Eugene, Oregon |
| Mar 7, 1991 | No. 9 | Oregon State | W 82–67 | 25–6 (13–4) | McKale Center; Tucson, Arizona |
| Mar 9, 1991 | No. 9 | Oregon | W 107–65 | 26–6 (14–4) | McKale Center; Tucson, Arizona |
NCAA Tournament
| Mar 14, 1991* | (2 W) No. 8 | vs. (15 W) Saint Francis | W 93–80 | 27–6 | Jon M. Huntsman Center; Salt Lake City, Utah |
| Mar 16, 1991* | (2 W) No. 8 | vs. (10 W) BYU | W 76–61 | 28–6 | Jon M. Huntsman Center; Salt Lake City, Utah |
| Mar 21, 1991* | (2 W) No. 8 | vs. (3 W) No. 13 Seton Hall | L 77–81 | 28–7 | Kingdome; Seattle, Washington |
*Non-conference game. ^{#}Rankings from AP Poll. (#) Tournament seedings in parentheses. W=West.

== Team players drafted into the NBA ==
| Round | Pick | Player | NBA club |
| 1 | 10 | Brian Williams | Orlando Magic |
