= 1994 West Coast Conference men's basketball tournament =

- Classification: Division I
- Season: 1993–94
- Teams: 8
- Site: Toso Pavilion; Santa Clara, California
- Champions: Pepperdine (3rd title)
- Winning coach: Tom Asbury (3rd title)
- MVP: Dana Jones (Pepperdine)

1993–94 West Coast Conference men's basketball standings
	Conf.				Overall
Team	W		L	PCT	W		L	PCT
Gonzaga	12	–	2	.857	22	–	8	.733
Pepperdine †	8	–	6	.571	19	–	11	.633
San Francisco	8	–	6	.571	17	–	11	.607
San Diego	7	–	7	.500	18	–	11	.621
Portland	6	–	8	.429	13	–	17	.433
Santa Clara	6	–	8	.429	13	–	14	.481
Saint Mary's	5	–	9	.357	13	–	14	.481
Loyola Marymount	4	–	10	.286	6	–	21	.222
† Conference tournament winner Rankings from AP poll

The 1994 West Coast Conference men's basketball tournament took place on March 5–7, 1994. All rounds were held in Santa Clara, California at the Toso Pavilion.

The Pepperdine Waves won the WCC Tournament title and an automatic bid to the 1994 NCAA tournament. Dana Jones of Pepperdine was named Tournament MVP.

== Format ==
With eight teams participating, all eight teams were placed into the first round, with teams seeded and paired based on regular-season records. After the first round, teams were re-seeded so the highest-remaining team was paired with the lowest-remaining time in one semifinal with the other two teams slotted into the other semifinal.

== Bracket ==
Quarter finals Saturday, March 5
1	Gonzaga	91
8	Loyola Marymount	76
4	San Diego	63
5	Portland	57
(Pairings are reseeded after the first round)
3	San Francisco	76
6	Santa Clara	74
2	Pepperdine	79
7	Saint Mary's	62

Semi-finals; Sunday, March 6
1	Gonzaga	75
4	San Diego	83
2	Pepperdine	82
3	San Francisco	79

Finals; Monday, March 7
4	San Diego	53
2	Pepperdine	56
