= 1990–91 DePaul Blue Demons men's basketball team =

American college basketball season

1990–91 DePaul Blue Demons men's basketball
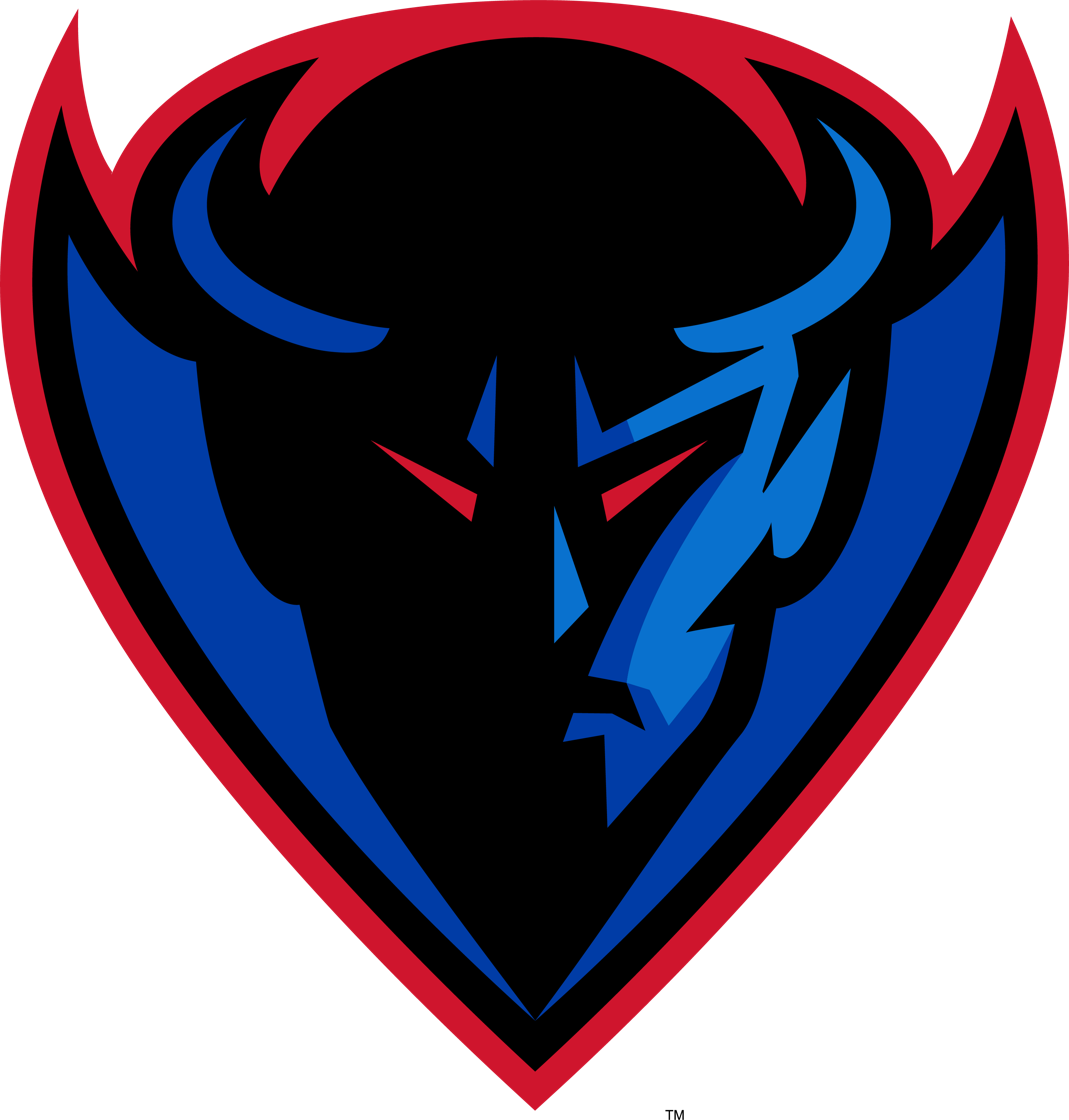

NCAA tournament, first round
- Conference: Independent

Ranking
- AP: No. 24
- Record: 20–9 ( Independent)
- Head coach: Joey Meyer (7th season)
- Assistant coaches: Ken Burmeister (1st season); Robert Collins; Jay Goedert; Rich Kolimas
- Home arena: Rosemont Horizon

1990–91 NCAA Division I men's basketball independents standings
	Conf.				Overall
Team	W		L	PCT	W		L	PCT
No. 24 DePaul	-	–	-	–	20	–	9	.690
Wright State	-	–	-	–	19	–	9	.679
Milwaukee	-	–	-	–	18	–	10	.643
Southern Utah	-	–	-	–	16	–	12	.571
Missouri–Kansas City	-	–	-	–	15	–	14	.517
Youngstown State	-	–	-	–	12	–	16	.429
Brooklyn	-	–	-	–	11	–	16	.407
Notre Dame	-	–	-	–	12	–	20	.375
Miami (FL)	-	–	-	–	9	–	19	.321
Southeastern Louisiana	-	–	-	–	9	–	19	.321
Cal State Northridge	-	–	-	–	8	–	20	.286
Florida International	-	–	-	–	6	–	22	.214
Liberty	-	–	-	–	5	–	23	.179
Chicago State	-	–	-	–	4	–	24	.143
Nicholls State	-	–	-	–	3	–	25	.107
Northeastern Illinois	-	–	-	–	2	–	25	.074
US International	-	–	-	–	2	–	26	.071
Rankings from AP Poll

The 1990–91 DePaul Blue Demons men's basketball team represented DePaul University during the 1990–91 NCAA Division I men's basketball season. They were led by head coach Joey Meyer, in his 7th season, and played their home games at the Rosemont Horizon in Rosemont.

== Roster ==
1990–91 DePaul Blue Demons men's basketball team
Players
Coaches

Pos.	#	Name	Height	Weight	Year	Previous school	Hometown
G	11	Joe Daughrity	6 ft 0 in (1.83 m)	165 lb (75 kg)	Jr	Crane	Chicago, IL
G	12	Chuck Miller	6 ft 1 in (1.85 m)	165 lb (75 kg)	Jr	St. Joseph	Westchester, IL
F	15	Kevin Holland	6 ft 8 in (2.03 m)	215 lb (98 kg)	RS Sr	Cerritos	Cerritos, CA
G	20	Melvon Foster	6 ft 3 in (1.91 m)	185 lb (84 kg)	Sr	Harper	Chicago, IL
SF	21	Stephen Howard	6 ft 9 in (2.06 m)	220 lb (100 kg)	Jr	Bishop Lynch HS	Dallas, TX
G	22	Brad Niemann	6 ft 3 in (1.91 m)	180 lb (82 kg)	RS Jr	Glenbrook South	Glenview, IL
F	23	Curtis Price	6 ft 6 in (1.98 m)	200 lb (91 kg)	RS So	St. Rita	Chicago, IL
G	25	Terry Davis	6 ft 4 in (1.93 m)	195 lb (88 kg)	So	Tri-Cities	College Park, GA
F/C	30	David Booth	6 ft 7 in (2.01 m)	205 lb (93 kg)	Jr	Manual HS	Peoria, IL
F/C	33	Bill Heppner	6 ft 9 in (2.06 m)	225 lb (102 kg)	RS Jr	Crystal Lake Central	Crystal Lake, IL
C	42	Jeff Stern	6 ft 10 in (2.08 m)	230 lb (104 kg)	Jr	Waxahachie	Waxahachie, TX
F/C	55	Michael Ravizee	6 ft 9 in (2.06 m)	250 lb (113 kg)	Fr	Woodlawn	Birmingham, AL

Head coach

- Joey Meyer

Assistant coach(es)

- Ken Burmeister (St. Mary's (TX))
- Robert Collins
- Jay Goedert
- Rich Kolimas

Legend

- (C) Team captain
- (S) Suspended
- (I) Ineligible
- (W) Walk-on
- Injured
- Current redshirt

Roster

== Schedule and results ==
Date time, TV	Rank^{#}	Opponent^{#}	Result	Record	Site city, state
Regular Season
Nov 24, 1990*		Hartford	W 84–73	1–0	Rosemont Horizon (7,986); Rosemont, Illinois
Nov 29, 1990*		Florida International	W 117–65	2–0	Rosemont Horizon (7,323); Rosemont, Illinois
Dec 1, 1990*		at Pepperdine	W 85–64	3–0	Firestone Fieldhouse (3,104); Malibu, California
Dec 8, 1990*		Illinois State	W 96–78	4–0	Rosemont Horizon (13,521); Rosemont, Illinois
Dec 12, 1990*		at Louisville	L 75–94	4–1	Freedom Hall (19,008); Louisville, Kentucky
Dec 15, 1990*		No. 6 UCLA	L 90–92	4–2	Rosemont Horizon (10,254); Rosemont, Illinois
Dec 22, 1990*		Wisconsin-Green Bay; Old Style Classic	L 56–57	4–3	Rosemont Horizon (9,586); Rosemont, Illinois
Dec 23, 1990*		Oklahoma State; Old Style Classic	L 70–72	4–4	Rosemont Horizon (9,269); Rosemont, Illinois
Dec 29, 1990*		vs. No. 7 North Carolina	L 75–90	4–5	Amway Arena (6,027); Orlando, Florida
Dec 30, 1990*		at Central Florida	W 81–78 ^{OT}	5–5	Amway Arena (3,500); Orlando, Florida
Jan 3, 1991*		at Dayton	W 81–73	6–5	UD Arena (11,633); Dayton, Ohio
Jan 7, 1991*		Marquette	W 68–63	7–5	Rosemont Horizon (9,367); Rosement, Illinois
Jan 12, 1991*		Houston	W 76–62	8–5	Rosemont Horizon (9,086); Rosement, Illinois
Jan 15, 1991*		at Northern Illinois	L 61–70	8–6	Chick Evans Field House (6,261); DeKalb, Illinois
Jan 19, 1991*		at Texas	L 80–90	8–7	Frank Erwin Center (13,465); Austin, Texas
Jan 23, 1991*		Drake	W 92–71	9–7	Rosemont Horizon (8,835); Rosemont, Illinois
Jan 26, 1991*		Duquesne	W 75–62	10–7	Rosemont Horizon (8,254); Rosemont, Illinois
Jan 28, 1991*		at Marquette	W 84–56	11–7	Bradley Center (13,368); Milwaukee, Wisconsin
Feb 3, 1991*		at No. 18 Georgetown	W 72–63	12–7	Capital Centre (12,379); Washington, D.C.
Feb 5, 1991*		Detroit	W 81–74	13–7	Rosemont Horizon (9,268); Rosemont, Illinois
Feb 9, 1991*		at Bradley	W 80–69	14–7	Carver Arena (9,549); Peoria, Illinois
Feb 13, 1991*		Loyola-Chicago	W 102–67	15–7	Rosemont Horizon (5,412); Rosemont, Illinois
Feb 16, 1991*		at Niagara	W 73–58	16–7	Niagara Falls Convention Center (2,014); Lewiston, New York
Feb 20, 1991*		at Notre Dame	L 77–80	16–8	Joyce Center (10,090); Notre Dame, Indiana
Feb 23, 1991*		at Miami (FL)	W 66–53	17–8	Miami Arena (3,191); Miami, Florida
Mar 2, 1991*		No. 17 St. John's	W 79–69	18–8	Rosemont Horizon (12,877); Rosemont, Illinois
Mar 6, 1991*	No. 25	Miami (FL)	W 75–58	19–8	Rosemont Horizon (9,049); Rosemont, Illinois
Mar 9, 1991*	No. 25	Notre Dame	W 80–56	20–8	Rosemont Horizon (17,486); Rosemont, Illinois
NCAA Tournament
Mar 15, 1991*	(9 MW) No. 24	vs. (8 MW) Georgia Tech; First Round	L 70–87	20–9	UD Arena (13,055); Dayton, Ohio
*Non-conference game. ^{#}Rankings from AP Poll. (#) Tournament seedings in parentheses. MW=Midwest. All times are in Central Time.
