= 1991 West Coast Conference men's basketball tournament =

- Classification: Division I
- Season: 1990–91
- Teams: 8
- Site: Toso Pavilion; Santa Clara, California
- Champions: Pepperdine (1st title)
- Winning coach: Tom Asbury (1st title)
- MVP: Geoff Lear (Pepperdine)

1990–91 West Coast Conference men's basketball standings
| | Conf. | | | | Overall |
| Team | W | | L | PCT | W | | L | PCT |
|---|---|---|---|---|---|---|---|---|
| Pepperdine † | 13 | – | 1 | .929 | 22 | – | 9 | .710 |
| Loyola Marymount | 9 | – | 5 | .643 | 16 | – | 15 | .516 |
| San Diego | 8 | – | 6 | .571 | 17 | – | 12 | .586 |
| Saint Mary's | 7 | – | 7 | .500 | 13 | – | 17 | .433 |
| Santa Clara | 7 | – | 7 | .500 | 16 | – | 13 | .552 |
| Gonzaga | 5 | – | 9 | .357 | 14 | – | 14 | .500 |
| San Francisco | 4 | – | 10 | .286 | 12 | – | 17 | .414 |
| Portland | 3 | – | 11 | .214 | 5 | – | 23 | .179 |
† Conference tournament winner Rankings from AP poll

The 1991 West Coast Conference men's basketball tournament was the fifth edition of the tournament, held March 2–4 at the Toso Pavilion at Santa Clara University in Santa Clara, California.

Top seed Pepperdine entered the tournament on a thirteen-game winning streak and defeated #4 seed Saint Mary's in the championship game, 71–68 in overtime, to win the Waves' first WCC tournament title.

Pepperdine's Doug Christie, the WCC player of the year, sprained his right knee in the quarterfinal opener against Portland, which ended his season.

The Waves received the conference's automatic bid to the 64-team NCAA tournament as the fourteenth seed in the West regional.

== Bracket ==
Quarterfinals; Saturday, March 2
1 | Pepperdine | 97
8 | Portland | 62
5 | Santa Clara | 74
4 | Saint Mary's | 79
(Pairings are reseeded after the first round)
3 | San Diego | 72
6 | Gonzaga | 62
7 | San Francisco | 101
2 | Loyola Marymount | 93

Semifinals; Sunday, March 3
1 | Pepperdine | 65
7 | San Francisco | 56
3 | San Diego | 72
4 | Saint Mary's | 75

Championship; Monday, March 4
1 | Pepperdine | 71*
4 | Saint Mary's | 68
