= 1990–91 Washington State Cougars men's basketball team =

American college basketball season

1990–91 Washington State Cougars men's basketball
- Conference: Pacific-10
- Record: 16–12 (8–10 Pac-10)
- Head coach: Kelvin Sampson (4th season)
- Home arena: Beasley Coliseum

1990–91 Pacific-10 Conference men's basketball standings
	Conf.				Overall
Team	W		L	PCT	W		L	PCT
No. 8 Arizona	14	–	4	.778	28	–	7	.800
No. 16 UCLA	11	–	7	.611	23	–	9	.719
Arizona State	10	–	8	.556	20	–	10	.667
USC	10	–	8	.556	19	–	10	.655
Stanford	8	–	10	.444	20	–	13	.606
Washington State	8	–	10	.444	16	–	12	.571
Oregon State	8	–	10	.444	14	–	14	.500
Oregon	8	–	10	.444	13	–	15	.464
California	8	–	10	.444	13	–	15	.464
Washington	5	–	13	.278	14	–	14	.500
As of April 15, 1991; Rankings from AP Poll

The 1990–91 Washington State Cougars men's basketball team represented Washington State University for the 1990–91 NCAA Division I men's basketball season. Led by fourth-year head coach Kelvin Sampson, the Cougars were members of the Pacific-10 Conference and played their home games on campus at Beasley Coliseum in Pullman, Washington.

The Cougars were 16–12 overall in the regular season and 8–10 in conference play, tied for fifth in the standings.

There was no conference tournament this season; last played in 1990, it resumed in 2002.
