= 1991 WAC men's basketball tournament =

- Classification: Division I
- Season: 1990–91
- Teams: 9
- Site: Arena-Auditorium; Laramie, WY
- Champions: BYU (1st title)
- Winning coach: Roger Reid (1st title)
- MVP: Shawn Bradley (BYU)

1990–91 WAC men's basketball standings
	Conf.				Overall
Team	W		L	PCT	W		L	PCT
No. 10 Utah	15	–	1	.938	30	–	4	.882
BYU †	11	–	5	.688	21	–	13	.618
New Mexico	10	–	6	.625	20	–	10	.667
Wyoming	8	–	8	.500	20	–	12	.625
UTEP	7	–	9	.438	16	–	13	.552
Hawaii	7	–	9	.438	16	–	13	.552
Colorado State	6	–	10	.375	15	–	14	.517
San Diego State	6	–	10	.375	13	–	16	.448
Air Force	2	–	14	.125	9	–	20	.310
† 1991 WAC tournament winner Rankings from AP Poll

The 1991 Western Athletic Conference men's basketball tournament was held March 6–9 at the Arena-Auditorium at the University of Wyoming in Laramie, Wyoming.

BYU defeated rival Utah in the championship game, 51–49, to clinch their first WAC men's tournament championship.

The Cougars, in turn, received an automatic bid to the 1991 NCAA tournament. They were joined in the tournament by Utah, the WAC regular season champion, and New Mexico.

== Format ==
The tournament field remained fixed at nine teams, and teams were again seeded based on regular season conference records. All teams were entered into the quarterfinal round with the exception of the two lowest-seeded teams, who played in the preliminary first round to determine who would then play against the tournament's top seed.

== Bracket ==
First round Wednesday, March 6
9	Air Force	51
8	San Diego State	58

Quarterfinals; Thursday, March 7
1	#8 Utah	67
8	San Diego State	56
5	UTEP	67
4	Wyoming	71
3	New Mexico	67
6	Hawaii	68
7	Colorado State	56
2	BYU	69

Semifinals; Friday, March 8
1	#8 Utah	69
4	Wyoming	63
6	Hawaii	71
2	BYU	73

Championship; Saturday, March 9
1	#8 Utah	49
2	BYU	51
