= Tom Asbury =

American basketball player-coach

Biographical details
- Born: July 14, 1945 (age 81); Denver, Colorado, U.S.

Playing career
- 1964–1967: Wyoming
- Position: Forward

Coaching career (HC unless noted)
- 1976–1979: Wyoming (assistant)
- 1979–1988: Pepperdine (assistant)
- 1988–1994: Pepperdine
- 1994–2000: Kansas State
- 2003–2007: Alabama (assistant)
- 2008–2011: Pepperdine

Head coaching record
- Overall: 453–238

Accomplishments and honors

Championships
- 3 WCC regular season (1991–1993); 3 WCC tournament (1991, 1992, 1994)

Awards
- 2× WCC Coach of the Year (1991, 1992)

Thomas Sydnor Asbury (born July 14, 1945) is an American former men's college basketball coach. He spent two separate terms as head coach at Pepperdine University, retiring from that position in 2011. He was also a head coach for Kansas State University and served as an assistant coach at Pepperdine, the University of Wyoming (his alma mater), and the University of Alabama.

== Career ==
=== Pepperdine ===
Asbury was an assistant coach at Pepperdine for nine seasons before succeeding Jim Harrick as head coach. Asbury was very successful in his first stint at Pepperdine, becoming the conference coach of the year twice and compiling a 125–59 record in his first six years. He took the Waves to the NCAA Tournament in 1991, 1992, and 1994, as well as two NIT appearances, three regular-season WCC titles, and three WCC Tournament championships.

=== Kansas State and Alabama ===
His success landed him the head coaching job at Kansas State University. He coached the Wildcats for six seasons, making the NCAA tournament once and the NIT tournament twice. However, his final season ended in 1999–2000 at Kansas State with a 9–19 record and a 2–14 conference record. He was fired and later returned to coaching as an assistant at the University of Alabama under former pupil Mark Gottfried. Mark Fox, the head coach at the University of California, is another former Asbury assistant, having coached with him at Kansas State.

=== Return to Pepperdine and retirement ===
Asbury came out of retirement to coach Pepperdine for a second time prior to the 2008–09 season. After three more seasons, on March 11, 2011, Asbury announced his retirement, turning the Pepperdine program over to assistant Marty Wilson. In October 2012, Asbury was inducted into the Pepperdine Athletics Hall of Fame.

== Head coaching record ==
Record table
Season	Team	Overall	Conference	Standing	Postseason
Pepperdine Waves (West Coast Athletic Conference/West Coast Conference) (1988–1994)
1988–89	Pepperdine	20–13	10–4	T–2nd	NIT second round
1989–90	Pepperdine	17–11	10–4	2nd	
1990–91	Pepperdine	22–9	13–1	1st	NCAA Division I first round
1991–92	Pepperdine	24–7	14–0	1st	NCAA Division I first round
1992–93	Pepperdine	23–8	11–3	1st	NIT second round
1993–94	Pepperdine	19–11	8–6	T–2nd	NCAA Division I first round
Pepperdine:		125–59 (.679)	66–18 (.786)		
Kansas State Wildcats (Big Eight Conference) (1994–1996)
1994–95	Kansas State	12–15	3–11	8th	
1995–96	Kansas State	17–12	7–7	4th	NCAA Division I first round
Kansas State Wildcats (Big 12 Conference) (1996–2000)
1996–97	Kansas State	10–17	3–13	T–10th	
1997–98	Kansas State	17–12	7–9	T–7th	NIT first round
1998–99	Kansas State	20–13	7–9	T–7th	NIT first round
1999–2000	Kansas State	9–19	2–14	12th	
Kansas State:		85–88 (.491)	29–63 (.315)		
Pepperdine Waves (West Coast Conference) (2008–2011)
2008–09	Pepperdine	9–23	5–9	6th	
2009–10	Pepperdine	7–24	3–11	T–6th	
2010–11	Pepperdine	16–18	5–9	6th	
Pepperdine:		32–66 (.327)	13–29 (.310)		
Total:		242–212 (.533)			
National champion Postseason invitational champion Conference regular season champion Conference regular season and conference tournament champion Division regular season champion Division regular season and conference tournament champion Conference tournament champion
