= 1991–92 Gonzaga Bulldogs men's basketball team =

American college basketball season

1991–92 Gonzaga Bulldogs men's basketball
- Conference: West Coast Conference
- Record: 20–10 (8–6 WCC)
- Head coach: Dan Fitzgerald (10th season)
- Assistant coaches: Dan Monson; Mark Few
- Home arena: Martin Centre

1991–92 West Coast Conference men's basketball standings
| | Conf. | | | | Overall |
| Team | W | | L | PCT | W | | L | PCT |
|---|---|---|---|---|---|---|---|---|
| Pepperdine † | 14 | – | 0 | 1.000 | 24 | – | 7 | .774 |
| Santa Clara | 9 | – | 5 | .643 | 14 | – | 15 | .483 |
| Loyola Marymount | 8 | – | 6 | .571 | 15 | – | 13 | .536 |
| Gonzaga | 8 | – | 6 | .571 | 20 | – | 10 | .667 |
| San Diego | 6 | – | 8 | .429 | 14 | – | 14 | .500 |
| San Francisco | 4 | – | 10 | .286 | 13 | – | 16 | .448 |
| Saint Mary's (CA) | 4 | – | 10 | .286 | 13 | – | 17 | .433 |
| Portland | 3 | – | 11 | .214 | 10 | – | 18 | .357 |
† Conference tournament winner Rankings from AP poll

The 1991–92 Gonzaga Bulldogs men's basketball team represented Gonzaga University in the West Coast Conference (WCC) during the 1991–92 NCAA Division I men's basketball season. Led by tenth-year head coach Dan Fitzgerald, the Bulldogs were 18–9 (.667) overall in the regular season (8–6 in WCC, fourth), and played their home games on campus at the Charlotte Y. Martin Centre in Spokane, Washington.

At the sixth conference tournament, the Zags finally gained their first tournament wins; they advanced to the final in Portland, but fell by three to top-seeded Pepperdine and finished at 20–10 (.667).

== Postseason results ==
| Date time, TV | Rank^{#} | Opponent^{#} | Result | Record | Site (attendance) city, state |
WCC tournament
| Sat, March 7 | (4) | vs. (5) San Diego; Quarterfinal | W 61–48 | 19–9 | Chiles Center; Portland, Oregon |
| Sun, March 7 | (4) | vs. (2) Santa Clara; Semifinal | W 54–51 | 20–9 | Chiles Center; Portland, Oregon |
| Mon, March 8 | (4) | vs. (1) Pepperdine; Final | L 70–73 | 20–10 | Chiles Center; Portland, Oregon |
*Non-conference game. ^{#}Rankings from AP poll. (#) Tournament seedings in parentheses. All times are in Pacific time.
