= 1990–91 Stanford Cardinal men's basketball team =

American college basketball season

1990–91 Stanford Cardinal men's basketball

NIT Champions
- Conference: Pacific-10 Conference
- Record: 20–13 (8–10 Pac-10)
- Head coach: Mike Montgomery (5th season)
- Assistant coaches: Doug Oliver; Ernie Kent
- Home arena: Maples Pavilion (Capacity: 7,392)

1990–91 Pacific-10 Conference men's basketball standings
	Conf.				Overall
Team	W		L	PCT	W		L	PCT
No. 8 Arizona	14	–	4	.778	28	–	7	.800
No. 16 UCLA	11	–	7	.611	23	–	9	.719
Arizona State	10	–	8	.556	20	–	10	.667
USC	10	–	8	.556	19	–	10	.655
Stanford	8	–	10	.444	20	–	13	.606
Washington State	8	–	10	.444	16	–	12	.571
Oregon State	8	–	10	.444	14	–	14	.500
Oregon	8	–	10	.444	13	–	15	.464
California	8	–	10	.444	13	–	15	.464
Washington	5	–	13	.278	14	–	14	.500
As of April 15, 1991; Rankings from AP Poll

The 1990–91 Stanford Cardinal men's basketball team represented Stanford University as a member of the Pacific-10 Conference during the 1990–91 NCAA Division I men's basketball season. They were led by fifth-year head coach Mike Montgomery.

== Roster ==
1988–89 Stanford Cardinal men's basketball team
Players
Coaches

Pos.	#	Name	Height	Weight	Year	Previous school	Hometown
G	11	John Patrick	6 ft 4 in (1.93 m)	—	Sr	Sidwell Friends School	Vienna, VA
G	20	Marcus Lollie	6 ft 0 in (1.83 m)	—	So		Seattle, WA
G	21	Kenny Hicks	6 ft 4 in (1.93 m)	—	So		Sherman Oaks, CA
G	22	Peter Dukes	6 ft 5 in (1.96 m)	—	So		Seattle, WA
F	30	Andrew Vlahov	6 ft 7 in (2.01 m)	238 lb (108 kg)	Sr	South Eugene High School	Perth, Western Australia
F	31	Adam Keefe	6 ft 9 in (2.06 m)	220 lb (100 kg)	Jr	Woodbridge High School	Irvine, CA
F	33	Brent Williams	6 ft 6 in (1.98 m)	—	Fr		Tacoma, WA
F	34	Deshon Wingate	6 ft 7 in (2.01 m)	—	Sr		Austin TX
C	40	Paul Garrett	6 ft 9 in (2.06 m)	—	So		Pacific Palisades, CA
F	43	Jason Weaver	6 ft 7 in (2.01 m)	—			Pueblo, CO
G	44	Kenny Ammann	—	—	So		Huntington Beach, CA
F	50	Lang Meyer	6 ft 9 in (2.06 m)	—	RS Jr		The Woodlands, TX
	55	Jim Morgan (redshirt)	6 ft 11 in (2.11 m)	—	Fr		Marietta, GA

Head coach

- Mike Montgomery (Colorado State)

Assistant coach(es)

- Doug Oliver (San José State)
- Ernie Kent (Oregon)

Legend

- (C) Team captain
- (S) Suspended
- (I) Ineligible
- (W) Walk-on
- Injured
- Current redshirt

Roster

== Schedule and results ==
Date time, TV	Rank^{#}	Opponent^{#}	Result	Record	Site (attendance) city, state
Regular season
November 23, 1990*		Rider; Stanford Invitational	W 93–66	1–0	Maples Pavilion; Stanford, CA
November 24, 1990*		Yale; Stanford Invitational	W 69–51	2–0	Maples Pavilion; Stanford, CA
November 30, 1990*		George Washington; Apple Invitational	L 70–81	2–1	Maples Pavilion; Stanford, CA
December 1, 1990*		Hawaii; Apple Invitational	W 84–55	3–1	Maples Pavilion; Stanford, CA
December 15, 1990*		Santa Clara	W 82–47	4–1	Maples Pavilion; Stanford, CA
December 19, 1990*		UC Irvine	W 117–87	5–1	Maples Pavilion; Stanford, CA
December 21, 1990*		Florida	W 86–74	6–1	Maples Pavilion; Stanford, CA
December 23, 1990*		at Colorado	L 79–89	6–2	Conference Center; Boulder, CO
December 29, 1990*		vs. UCF; Red Lobster Classic	W 70–61	7–2	Orlando Arena; Orlando, FL
December 30, 1990*		vs. No. 7 North Carolina; Red Lobster Classic	L 60–71	7–3	Maples Pavilion; Stanford, CA
January 3, 1991		at Oregon State	L 66–73	7–4 (0–1)	Gill Coliseum; Corvallis, OR
January 6, 1991		at Oregon	L 77–81	7–5 (0–2)	McArthur Court; Eugene, OR
January 10, 1991		Washington	W 87–55	8–5 (1–2)	Maples Pavilion; Stanford, CA
January 12, 1991		Washington State	W 94–63	9–5 (2–2)	Maples Pavilion; Stanford, CA
January 16, 1991		at No. 7 UCLA	W 89–82	10–5 (3–2)	Pauley Pavilion; Los Angeles, CA
January 19, 1991		at USC Trojans	L 67–85	10–6 (3–3)	Los Angeles Memorial Sports Arena; Los Angeles, CA
January 24, 1991		No. 5 Arizona	L 76–78	10–7 (3–4)	Maples Pavilion; Stanford, CA
January 27, 1991		Arizona State	L 47–58	10–8 (3–5)	Maples Pavilion; Stanford, CA
January 31, 1991		Oregon	W 86–75	11–8 (4–5)	Maples Pavilion; Stanford, CA
February 2, 1991		Oregon State	W 64–59	12–8 (5–5)	Maples Pavilion; Stanford, CA
February 7, 1991		at Washington State	L 68–74	12–9 (5–6)	Beasley Coliseum; Pullman, WA
February 10, 1991		at Washington	W 60–59	13–9 (6–6)	Hec Edmundson Pavilion; Seattle, WA
February 14, 1991		USC	W 92–76	14–9 (7–6)	Maples Pavilion; Stanford, CA
February 16, 1991		No. 15 UCLA	L 86–89	14–10 (7–7)	Maples Pavilion; Stanford, CA
February 21, 1991		at Arizona State	L 57–75	14–11 (7–8)	Desert Financial Arena; Tempe, AZ
February 26, 1991		at No. 7 Arizona	L 51–89	14–12 (7–9)	McKale Center; Tucson, AZ
March 2, 1991		California	W 90–72	15–12 (8–9)	Maples Pavilion; Stanford, CA
March 7, 1991		at California	L 70–75	15–13 (8–10)	Harmon Gym; Berkeley, CA
NIT
March 13, 1991*		Houston; First Round	W 93–86	16–13	Maples Pavilion; Stanford, CA
March 18, 1991*		at Wisconsin; Second Round	W 80–72	17–13	Wisconsin Field House; Madison, WI
March 21, 1991*		at Southern Illinois; Quarterfinals	W 78–68	18–13	SIU Arena; Carbondale, IL
March 25, 1991*		vs. UMass; Semifinals	W 73–71	19–13	Madison Square Garden; New York City, NY
March 27, 1991*		vs. Oklahoma; Championship	W 78–72	20–13	Madison Square Garden; New York City, NY
*Non-conference game. ^{#}Rankings from AP Poll. (#) Tournament seedings in parentheses. All times are in Pacific Time.

Schedule Source:
