= 1990–91 Washington Huskies men's basketball team =

American college basketball season

1990–91 Washington Huskies men's basketball
- Conference: Pacific-10 Conference
- Record: 14–14 (5–13 Pac-10)
- Head coach: Lynn Nance (2nd season)
- Assistant coach: Trent Johnson (2nd season)
- Home arena: Hec Edmundson Pavilion

1990–91 Pacific-10 Conference men's basketball standings
	Conf.				Overall
Team	W		L	PCT	W		L	PCT
No. 8 Arizona	14	–	4	.778	28	–	7	.800
No. 16 UCLA	11	–	7	.611	23	–	9	.719
Arizona State	10	–	8	.556	20	–	10	.667
USC	10	–	8	.556	19	–	10	.655
Stanford	8	–	10	.444	20	–	13	.606
Washington State	8	–	10	.444	16	–	12	.571
Oregon State	8	–	10	.444	14	–	14	.500
Oregon	8	–	10	.444	13	–	15	.464
California	8	–	10	.444	13	–	15	.464
Washington	5	–	13	.278	14	–	14	.500
As of April 15, 1991; Rankings from AP Poll

The 1990–91 Washington Huskies men's basketball team represented the University of Washington for the 1990–91 NCAA Division I men's basketball season. Led by second-year head coach Lynn Nance, the Huskies were members of the Pacific-10 Conference and played their home games on campus at Hec Edmundson Pavilion in Seattle, Washington.

The Huskies were 14–14 overall in the regular season and 5–13 in conference play, last in the standings. Two notable wins were upsets of ranked opponents at Hec Ed: #4 Arizona in early January, and #16 UCLA two months later.

There was no conference tournament this season; last played in 1990, it resumed in 2002.
