= 1990–91 USC Trojans men's basketball team =

American college basketball season

1990–91 USC Trojans men's basketball

NCAA tournament, first round
- Conference: Pacific-10 Conference
- Record: 19–10 (10–8 Pac-10)
- Head coach: George Raveling (5th season)
- Assistant coach: Brian Hammel
- Home arena: L. A. Sports Arena

1990–91 Pacific-10 Conference men's basketball standings
	Conf.				Overall
Team	W		L	PCT	W		L	PCT
No. 8 Arizona	14	–	4	.778	28	–	7	.800
No. 16 UCLA	11	–	7	.611	23	–	9	.719
Arizona State	10	–	8	.556	20	–	10	.667
USC	10	–	8	.556	19	–	10	.655
Stanford	8	–	10	.444	20	–	13	.606
Washington State	8	–	10	.444	16	–	12	.571
Oregon State	8	–	10	.444	14	–	14	.500
Oregon	8	–	10	.444	13	–	15	.464
California	8	–	10	.444	13	–	15	.464
Washington	5	–	13	.278	14	–	14	.500
As of April 15, 1991; Rankings from AP Poll

The 1990–91 USC Trojans men's basketball team represented the University of Southern California during the 1990–91 NCAA Division I men's basketball season. Led by head coach George Raveling, they played their home games at the L. A. Sports Arena in Los Angeles, California as members of the Pac-10 Conference.

== Roster ==
1990–91 USC Trojans men's basketball team
Players
Coaches

Pos.	#	Name	Height	Weight	Year	Previous school	Hometown
G	12	Duane Cooper	6 ft 1 in (1.85 m)	185 lb (84 kg)	Jr	Lakewood	Benton Harbor, MI
G	20	Robert Pack	6 ft 2 in (1.88 m)	180 lb (82 kg)	Sr	Tyler JC	New Orleans, LA
G	23	Harold Miner	6 ft 5 in (1.96 m)	205 lb (93 kg)	So	Inglewood	Inglewood, CA
F/C	24	Ronnie Coleman	6 ft 7 in (2.01 m)	210 lb (95 kg)	Sr

Head coach

- George Raveling (Villanova)

Assistant coach(es)

Legend

- (C) Team captain
- (S) Suspended
- (I) Ineligible
- (W) Walk-on
- Injured
- Current redshirt

== Schedule and results ==
Date time, TV	Rank^{#}	Opponent^{#}	Result	Record	Site (attendance) city, state
Regular season
Nov 24, 1990*		Chicago State	W 110–69	1–0	L.A. Sports Arena; Los Angeles, California
Nov 28, 1990*		at Maryland	L 59–72	1–1	Cole Fieldhouse; College Park, Maryland
Dec 1, 1990*		Miami (FL)	W 92–71	2–1	L.A. Sports Arena; Los Angeles, California
Dec 4, 1990*		San Diego State	W 77–66	3–1	L.A. Sports Arena; Los Angeles, California
Dec 8, 1990*		at Colorado State	W 74–67	4–1	Moby Arena; Fort Collins, Colorado
Dec 12, 1990*		at Notre Dame	W 105–95	5–1	Joyce Center; Notre Dame, Indiana
Dec 22, 1990*		Augusta State	W 90–63	6–1	L.A. Sports Arena; Los Angeles, California
Dec 28, 1990*		vs. Harvard	W 103–76	7–1	Long Beach Arena; Long Beach, California
Dec 29, 1990*		vs. LIU Brooklyn	W 70–55	8–1	Long Beach Arena; Long Beach, California
Jan 2, 1991		at No. 10 UCLA	L 81–98	8–2 (0–1)	Pauley Pavilion; Los Angeles, California
Jan 10, 1991		at No. 6 Arizona	L 85–87	8–3 (0–2)	McKale Center; Tucson, Arizona
Jan 12, 1991		at Arizona State	L 80–84 ^{OT}	8–4 (0–3)	Wells Fargo Arena; Tempe, Arizona
Jan 17, 1991		California	L 66–69	8–5 (0–4)	L.A. Sports Arena; Los Angeles, California
Jan 19, 1991		Stanford	W 85–67	9–5 (1–4)	L.A. Sports Arena; Los Angeles, California
Jan 24, 1991		at Oregon	L 84–86	9–6 (1–5)	McArthur Court; Eugene, Oregon
Jan 26, 1991		at Oregon State	W 70–68	10–6 (2–5)	Gill Coliseum; Corvallis, Oregon
Jan 30, 1991		No. 12 UCLA	W 76–74	11–6 (3–5)	L.A. Sports Arena; Los Angeles, California
Feb 4, 1991*		Cal State Northridge	W 86–69	12–6	L.A. Sports Arena; Los Angeles, California
Feb 7, 1991		No. 5 Arizona	W 87–83	13–6 (4–5)	L.A. Sports Arena; Los Angeles, California
Feb 9, 1991		Arizona State	L 83–88	13–7 (4–6)	L.A. Sports Arena; Los Angeles, California
Feb 14, 1991		at Stanford	L 76–92	13–8 (4–7)	Maples Pavilion; Stanford, California
Feb 16, 1991		at California	W 85–76	14–8 (5–7)	Harmon Gym; Berkeley, California
Feb 21, 1991		Oregon State	W 85–75	15–8 (6–7)	L.A. Sports Arena; Los Angeles, California
Feb 23, 1991		Oregon	W 84–71	16–8 (7–7)	L.A. Sports Arena; Los Angeles, California
Feb 28, 1991		at Washington	L 65–82	16–9 (7–8)	Bank of America Arena; Seattle, Washington
Mar 2, 1991		at Washington State	W 80–62	17–9 (8–8)	Friel Court; Pullman, Washington
Mar 7, 1991*		Washington	W 75–51	18–9 (9–8)	L.A. Sports Arena; Los Angeles, California
Mar 9, 1991		Washington State	W 74–57	19–9 (10–8)	L.A. Sports Arena; Los Angeles, California
NCAA Tournament
Mar 14, 1991*	(10 SE)	vs. (7 SE) Florida State; First Round	L 72–75	19–10	Freedom Hall; Louisville, Kentucky
*Non-conference game. ^{#}Rankings from AP Poll. (#) Tournament seedings in parentheses. All times are in Pacific Time.

== Awards and honors ==
- Harold Miner – Honorable Mention All-American (AP)
