= 1990–91 Utah Utes men's basketball team =

American college basketball season

1990–91 Utah Utes men's basketball

WAC Regular season champions

NCAA tournament, Sweet Sixteen
- Conference: Western Athletic Conference

Ranking
- Coaches: No. 10
- AP: No. 10
- Record: 30–4 (15–1 WAC)
- Head coach: Rick Majerus (2nd season)
- Assistant coach: Kirk Earlywine
- Home arena: Jon M. Huntsman Center

1990–91 WAC men's basketball standings
	Conf.				Overall
Team	W		L	PCT	W		L	PCT
No. 10 Utah	15	–	1	.938	30	–	4	.882
BYU †	11	–	5	.688	21	–	13	.618
New Mexico	10	–	6	.625	20	–	10	.667
Wyoming	8	–	8	.500	20	–	12	.625
UTEP	7	–	9	.438	16	–	13	.552
Hawaii	7	–	9	.438	16	–	13	.552
Colorado State	6	–	10	.375	15	–	14	.517
San Diego State	6	–	10	.375	13	–	16	.448
Air Force	2	–	14	.125	9	–	20	.310
† 1991 WAC tournament winner Rankings from AP Poll

The 1990–91 Utah Utes men's basketball team represented the University of Utah as a member of the Western Athletic Conference during the 1990–91 men's basketball season. Led by head coach Rick Majerus, the Utes made a run to the Sweet Sixteen of the NCAA tournament before falling to unbeaten UNLV in the West regional semifinals. The Utes finished with an overall record of 30–4 (15–1 WAC).

== Roster ==
1990–91 Utah Utes men's basketball team
Players
Coaches

Pos.	#	Name	Height	Weight	Year	Hometown
F	5	Josh Grant	6 ft 9 in (2.06 m)	220 lb (100 kg)	Jr	Salt Lake City, Utah
G	15	Jimmy Soto	5 ft 9 in (1.75 m)	—	So
C	30	Walter Watts	6 ft 8 in (2.03 m)	250 lb (113 kg)	Jr
G/F	32	Phil Dixon	6 ft 5 in (1.96 m)	—	So
G	45	Byron Wilson	6 ft 2 in (1.88 m)	210 lb (95 kg)	So	Gary, Indiana

Head coach

- Rick Majerus (Marquette)

Assistant coach(es)

- Kirk Earlywine (Campbell)

Legend

- (C) Team captain
- (S) Suspended
- (I) Ineligible
- (W) Walk-on
- Injured
- Current redshirt

== Schedule and results ==
Date time, TV	Rank^{#}	Opponent^{#}	Result	Record	Site city, state
Non-conference regular season
Nov 24, 1990*		UC Davis	W 106–72	1–0	Jon M. Huntsman Center; Salt Lake City, Utah
Nov 26, 1990*		Seattle Pacific	W 68–41	2–0	Jon M. Huntsman Center; Salt Lake City, Utah
Nov 28, 1990*		at Wisconsin-Milwaukee	W 80–78	3–0	Klotsche Center; Milwaukee, Wisconsin
Dec 1, 1990*		at Michigan	L 65–81	3–1	Crisler Arena; Ann Arbor, Michigan
Dec 4, 1990*		Utah State	W 84–76	4–1	Jon M. Huntsman Center; Salt Lake City, Utah
Dec 6, 1990*		Oregon	W 95–81	5–1	Jon M. Huntsman Center; Salt Lake City, Utah
Dec 8, 1990*		at UC Irvine	W 97–80	6–1	Bren Events Center; Irvine, California
Dec 15, 1990*		Pacific (Oregon)	W 71–54	7–1	Jon M. Huntsman Center; Salt Lake City, Utah
Dec 17, 1990*		Weber State	W 68–52	8–1	Jon M. Huntsman Center; Salt Lake City, Utah
Dec 19, 1990*		Morehead State	W 77–48	9–1	Jon M. Huntsman Center; Salt Lake City, Utah
Dec 22, 1990*		Wichita State	W 95–48	10–1	Jon M. Huntsman Center; Salt Lake City, Utah
Dec 29, 1990*		at Utah State	W 74–63	11–1	Dee Glen Smith Spectrum; Logan, Utah
WAC regular season
Jan 3, 1991		at Hawaii	W 63–60	12–1 (1–0)	Neal S. Blaisdell Center; Honolulu, Hawaii
Jan 5, 1991		at San Diego State	W 68–62	13–1 (2–0)	San Diego Sports Arena; San Diego, California
Jan 10, 1991		New Mexico	W 65–53	14–1 (3–0)	Jon M. Huntsman Center; Salt Lake City, Utah
Jan 12, 1991		No. 25 UTEP	W 67–60	15–1 (4–0)	Jon M. Huntsman Center; Salt Lake City, Utah
Jan 17, 1991	No. 23	at Wyoming	W 90–83	16–1 (5–0)	Arena-Auditorium; Laramie, Wyoming
Jan 19, 1991	No. 23	at Air Force	W 57–47	17–1 (6–0)	Clune Arena; Colorado Springs, Colorado
Jan 24, 1991	No. 20	Colorado State	W 55–51	18–1 (7–0)	Jon M. Huntsman Center; Salt Lake City, Utah
Jan 26, 1991	No. 20	Air Force	W 62–56	19–1 (8–0)	Jon M. Huntsman Center; Salt Lake City, Utah
Jan 31, 1991	No. 13	at UTEP	W 78–68	20–1 (9–0)	Special Events Center; El Paso, Texas
Feb 2, 1991	No. 13	at New Mexico	L 62–68	20–2 (9–1)	The Pit; Albuquerque, New Mexico
Feb 7, 1991	No. 17	Hawaii	W 80–60	21–2 (10–1)	Jon M. Huntsman Center; Salt Lake City, Utah
Feb 9, 1991	No. 17	San Diego State	W 67–60	22–2 (11–1)	Jon M. Huntsman Center; Salt Lake City, Utah
Feb 14, 1991	No. 14	Wyoming	W 77–72	23–2 (12–1)	Jon M. Huntsman Center; Salt Lake City, Utah
Feb 16, 1991	No. 14	BYU; Rivalry	W 81–74	24–2 (13–1)	Jon M. Huntsman Center; Salt Lake City, Utah
Feb 21, 1991	No. 10	at Colorado State	W 67–56	25–2 (14–1)	Moby Arena; Fort Collins, Colorado
Mar 2, 1991	No. 9	at BYU; Rivalry	W 72–71	26–2 (15–1)	Marriott Center; Provo, Utah
WAC Tournament
Mar 7, 1991*	(1) No. 8	vs. (8) San Diego State; WAC Tournament Quarterfinal	W 67–56	27–2	Arena-Auditorium; Laramie, Wyoming
Mar 8, 1991*	(1) No. 8	at (4) Wyoming; WAC Tournament Semifinal	W 69–63	28–2	Arena-Auditorium; Laramie, Wyoming
Mar 9, 1991*	(1) No. 8	vs. (2) BYU; WAC tournament championship	L 49–51 ^{OT}	28–3	Arena-Auditorium; Laramie, Wyoming
NCAA Tournament
Mar 15, 1991*	(4 W) No. 10	vs. (13 W) South Alabama; First round	W 82–72	29–3	McKale Center; Tucson, Arizona
Mar 17, 1991*	(4 W) No. 10	vs. (5 W) Michigan State; Second Round	W 85–84 ^{2OT}	30–3	McKale Center; Tucson, Arizona
Mar 21, 1991*	(4 W) No. 10	vs. (1 W) No. 1 UNLV; West Regional semifinal – Sweet Sixteen	L 66–83	30–4	Kingdome; Seattle, Washington
*Non-conference game. ^{#}Rankings from AP Poll. (#) Tournament seedings in parentheses. W=West.

== Awards and honors ==
- Josh Grant – WAC Player of the Year
