= 1990–91 Pepperdine Waves men's basketball team =

American college basketball season

1990–91 Pepperdine Waves men's basketball

WCC Regular season champions WCC tournament champions

NCAA tournament
- Conference: West Coast Conference
- Record: 22–9 (13–1 WCC)
- Head coach: Tom Asbury (3rd season)
- Home arena: Firestone Fieldhouse

1990–91 West Coast Conference men's basketball standings
	Conf.				Overall
Team	W		L	PCT	W		L	PCT
Pepperdine †	13	–	1	.929	22	–	9	.710
Loyola Marymount	9	–	5	.643	16	–	15	.516
San Diego	8	–	6	.571	17	–	12	.586
Saint Mary's	7	–	7	.500	13	–	17	.433
Santa Clara	7	–	7	.500	16	–	13	.552
Gonzaga	5	–	9	.357	14	–	14	.500
San Francisco	4	–	10	.286	12	–	17	.414
Portland	3	–	11	.214	5	–	23	.179
† Conference tournament winner Rankings from AP poll

The 1990–91 Pepperdine Waves men's basketball team represented Pepperdine University in the 1990–91 NCAA Division I men's basketball season. The team was led by head coach Tom Asbury. The Waves played their home games at the Firestone Fieldhouse and were members of the West Coast Conference. They finished the season 22–9, 13–1 in WCC play to win the regular season conference title by a 4-game margin. After a January 11 home loss to San Diego in the conference opener, Pepperdine was just 6–8 overall. The Waves then went on a 16-game winning streak and won the West Coast Conference tournament to receive the conference's automatic bid to the NCAA tournament. In the opening round, the Waves fell to Seton Hall, 71–51.

== Roster ==
1990–91 Pepperdine Waves men's basketball team
Players
Coaches

Pos.	#	Name	Height	Weight	Year	Previous school	Hometown
F	10	Steve Guild	6 ft 6 in (1.98 m)	—	Fr	Marina	Huntington Beach, California
G		Steve Clover	6 ft 4 in (1.93 m)	—		Rolling Hills	Rancho Palos Verdes, California
G	12	Damin Lopez	5 ft 9 in (1.75 m)	—	RS Fr	Apollo	Glendale, Arizona
G	15	Rick Welch	6 ft 0 in (1.83 m)	—	Jr	Westlake	Westlake Village, California
F	21	Dana Jones	6 ft 7 in (2.01 m)	—	Fr	North Hollywood	Los Angeles, California
G		Rodney Sanders	6 ft 3 in (1.91 m)	—		Fairfax	Los Angeles, California
F	34	Geoff Lear	6 ft 8 in (2.03 m)	—	Jr	Bishop Amat	West Covina, California
G	35	Doug Christie	6 ft 6 in (1.98 m)	190 lb (86 kg)	Jr	Rainier Beach	Seattle, Washington
F	41	Byron Jenson (redshirt)	—	—		UTSA	Tucson, Arizona
F		Rex Manu	6 ft 8 in (2.03 m)	—	Sr	Skyline JC	San Mateo, California
C	52	Derek Noether	6 ft 8 in (2.03 m)	—	Fr	Clovis West	Fresno, California
C		Damon Braly	6 ft 9 in (2.06 m)	—	Sr	Arvada	Arvada, Colorado

Head coach

- Tom Asbury (Wyoming)

Assistant coach(es)

Legend

- (C) Team captain
- (S) Suspended
- (I) Ineligible
- (W) Walk-on
- Injured
- Current redshirt

== Schedule and results ==
Date time, TV	Rank^{#}	Opponent^{#}	Result	Record	Site (attendance) city, state
Non-conference regular season
Nov 23, 1990*		vs. Montana State; Coors Light Classic	W 83–76	1–0	Selland Arena; Fresno, California
Nov 24, 1990*		at Fresno State; Coors Light Classic	W 84–64	2–0	Selland Arena; Fresno, California
Nov 27, 1990*		UC Santa Barbara	W 72–60	3–0	Firestone Fieldhouse; Malibu, California
Dec 1, 1990*		DePaul	L 64–85	3–1	Firestone Fieldhouse; Malibu, California
Dec 3, 1990*		Nebraska-Omaha	W 62–41	4–1	Firestone Fieldhouse; Malibu, California
Dec 8, 1990*		Cal State Fullerton	L 66–69 ^{OT}	4–2	Firestone Fieldhouse; Malibu, California
Dec 13, 1990*		Texas Tech	W 75–70	5–2	Firestone Fieldhouse; Malibu, California
Dec 15, 1990*		at Boise State	L 56–66	5–3	BSU Pavilion; Boise, Idaho
Dec 19, 1990*		at No. 5 UCLA	L 85–108	5–4	Pauley Pavilion; Los Angeles, California
Dec 22, 1990*		Jacksonville	W 75–69	6–4	Firestone Fieldhouse; Malibu, California
Dec 27, 1990*		at No. 4 Arizona; Fiesta Bowl Classic	L 66–80	6–5	McKale Center; Tucson, Arizona
Dec 28, 1990*		vs. Temple; Fiesta Bowl Classic	L 55–56	6–6	McKale Center; Tucson, Arizona
Jan 2, 1991*		Kansas	L 62–88	6–7	Firestone Fieldhouse; Malibu, California
WCC Regular Season
Jan 11, 1991		San Diego	L 88–91	6–8 (0–1)	Firestone Fieldhouse; Malibu, California
Jan 12, 1991		Santa Clara	W 67–61	7–8 (1–1)	Firestone Fieldhouse; Malibu, California
Jan 16, 1991		Loyola Marymount	W 91–79	8–8 (2–1)	Firestone Fieldhouse; Malibu, California
Jan 19, 1991		at Loyola Marymount	W 101–95	9–8 (3–1)	Gersten Pavilion; Los Angeles, California
Jan 25, 1991		at San Francisco	W 84–67	10–8 (4–1)	War Memorial Gymnasium; San Francisco, California
Jan 26, 1991		at Saint Mary's	W 79–78	11–8 (5–1)	McKeon Pavilion; Moraga, California
Feb 1, 1991		Saint Mary's	W 82–78 ^{2OT}	12–8 (6–1)	Firestone Fieldhouse; Malibu, California
Feb 2, 1991		San Francisco	W 72–57	13–8 (7–1)	Firestone Fieldhouse; Malibu, California
Feb 7, 1991		at Portland	W 87–74	14–8 (8–1)	Chiles Center; Portland, Oregon
Feb 9, 1991		at Gonzaga	W 80–56	15–8 (9–1)	The Kennel; Spokane, Washington
Feb 15, 1991		Gonzaga	W 84–56	16–8 (10–1)	Firestone Fieldhouse; Malibu, California
Feb 16, 1991		Portland	W 81–58	17–8 (11–1)	Firestone Fieldhouse; Malibu, California
Feb 21, 1991		at Santa Clara	W 77–66	18–8 (12–1)	Toso Pavilion; Santa Clara, California
Feb 23, 1991		at San Diego	W 75–69	19–8 (13–1)	USD Sports Center; San Diego, California
WCC tournament
Mar 2, 1991*		vs. Portland; WCC Tournament Quarterfinal	W 97–62	20–8	Toso Pavilion; Santa Clara, California
Mar 3, 1991*		vs. San Francisco; WCC Tournament Semifinal	W 65–56	21–8	Toso Pavilion; Santa Clara, California
Mar 4, 1991*		vs. Saint Mary's; WCC tournament championship	W 71–68 ^{OT}	22–8	Toso Pavilion; Santa Clara, California
NCAA tournament
Mar 14, 1991*	(14 W)	vs. (3 W) No. 13 Seton Hall; First Round	L 51–71	22–9	Jon M. Huntsman Center; Salt Lake City, Utah
*Non-conference game. ^{#}Rankings from AP Poll. (#) Tournament seedings in parentheses. W=West.

== Awards and honors ==
- Doug Christie – WCC Player of the Year
- Dana Jones – WCC Freshman of the Year
- Tom Asbury – WCC Coach of the Year

Pepperdine swept the WCC awards – only the second time a conference team had done so since 1952.
