= 1992 West Coast Conference men's basketball tournament =

- Classification: Division I
- Season: 1991–92
- Teams: 8
- Site: Chiles Center; Portland, Oregon
- Champions: Pepperdine (2nd title)
- Winning coach: Tom Asbury (2nd title)
- MVP: Doug Christie (Pepperdine)

1991–92 West Coast Conference men's basketball standings
	Conf.				Overall
Team	W		L	PCT	W		L	PCT
Pepperdine †	14	–	0	1.000	24	–	7	.774
Santa Clara	9	–	5	.643	14	–	15	.483
Loyola Marymount	8	–	6	.571	15	–	13	.536
Gonzaga	8	–	6	.571	20	–	10	.667
San Diego	6	–	8	.429	14	–	14	.500
San Francisco	4	–	10	.286	13	–	16	.448
Saint Mary's (CA)	4	–	10	.286	13	–	17	.433
Portland	3	–	11	.214	10	–	18	.357
† Conference tournament winner Rankings from AP poll

The 1992 West Coast Conference men's basketball tournament was held March 7–9 at the Chiles Center on the campus of the University of Portland in Portland, Oregon. This was the sixth edition of the tournament.

Top seed Pepperdine defeated #4 seed Gonzaga 73–70 in the championship game to successfully defend their WCC tournament title. Runner-up Gonzaga had been winless in the first five editions, losing its opener (quarterfinal) each year.

The Waves earned the automatic bid to the 64-team NCAA tournament and were seeded eleventh in the Midwest regional.

== Bracket ==
Quarterfinals; Saturday, March 7
1	Pepperdine	97
8	Portland	83
5	San Diego	48
4	Gonzaga	61
(Pairings are reseeded after the first round)
3	Loyola Marymount	85
6	San Francisco	100
7	Saint Mary's	57
2	Santa Clara	59

Semifinals; Sunday, March 8
1	Pepperdine	67
6	San Francisco	65
4	Gonzaga	54
2	Santa Clara	51

Championship; Monday, March 9
1	Pepperdine	73
4	Gonzaga	70
