= 1990–91 New Mexico Lobos men's basketball team =

American college basketball season

1990–91 New Mexico Lobos men's basketball

NCAA tournament
- Conference: Western Athletic Conference
- Record: 20–10 (10–6 WAC)
- Head coach: Dave Bliss (3rd season)
- Assistant coach: Paul Graham (1st season)
- Home arena: University Arena

1990–91 WAC men's basketball standings
	Conf.				Overall
Team	W		L	PCT	W		L	PCT
No. 10 Utah	15	–	1	.938	30	–	4	.882
BYU †	11	–	5	.688	21	–	13	.618
New Mexico	10	–	6	.625	20	–	10	.667
Wyoming	8	–	8	.500	20	–	12	.625
UTEP	7	–	9	.438	16	–	13	.552
Hawaii	7	–	9	.438	16	–	13	.552
Colorado State	6	–	10	.375	15	–	14	.517
San Diego State	6	–	10	.375	13	–	16	.448
Air Force	2	–	14	.125	9	–	20	.310
† 1991 WAC tournament winner Rankings from AP Poll

The 1990–91 New Mexico Lobos men's basketball team represented the University of New Mexico as a member of the Western Athletic Conference. The Lobos were coached by head coach Dave Bliss and played their home games at the University Arena, also known as "The Pit", in Albuquerque, New Mexico.

== Roster ==
1990–91 New Mexico Lobos men's basketball team
Players
Coaches

Pos.	#	Name	Height	Weight	Year	Hometown
C	13	Luc Longley	7 ft 2 in (2.18 m)	255 lb (116 kg)	Sr	Melbourne, Victoria
G	42	Rob Robbins	6 ft 5 in (1.96 m)	—	Sr

Head coach

- Dave Bliss

Assistant coach(es)

- Paul Graham

Legend

- (C) Team captain
- (S) Suspended
- (I) Ineligible
- (W) Walk-on
- Injured
- Current redshirt

== Schedule and results ==
Date time, TV	Rank^{#}	Opponent^{#}	Result	Record	Site (attendance) city, state
Regular season
Nov 23, 1990*		Texas-Arlington	W 136–99	1–0	University Arena; Albuquerque, New Mexico
Nov 24, 1990*		San Francisco	W 94–77	2–0	University Arena; Albuquerque, New Mexico
Dec 1, 1990*		at Texas Tech	W 66–55	3–0	Lubbock Municipal Coliseum; Lubbock, Texas
Dec 3, 1990*		Maryland Eastern Shore	W 79–62	4–0	University Arena; Albuquerque, New Mexico
Dec 5, 1990*		at Arizona State	L 54–59	4–1	Wells Fargo Arena; Tempe, Arizona
Dec 8, 1990*		New Mexico State; Rivalry	W 94–88	5–1	University Arena; Albuquerque, New Mexico
Dec 15, 1990*		at New Mexico State; Rivalry	L 64–72	5–2	Pan American Center; Las Cruces, New Mexico
Mar 2, 1991		at UTEP	W 72–70	20–8 (10–6)	Special Events Center; El Paso, Texas
WAC tournament
Mar 7, 1991*	(3)	vs. (6) Hawaii; Quarterfinals	L 67–68	20–9	Arena-Auditorium; Laramie, Wyoming
NCAA tournament
Mar 14, 1991*	(14 E)	vs. (3 E) No. 14 Oklahoma State; First Round	L 54–67	20–10	Cole Fieldhouse; College Park, Maryland
*Non-conference game. ^{#}Rankings from AP poll. (#) Tournament seedings in parentheses. E=East.

== Awards and honors ==
- Luc Longley – Honorable mention AP All-American

== NBA draft ==
Round	Pick	Player	NBA club
1	7	Luc Longley	Minnesota Timberwolves
