= 1991–92 Pepperdine Waves men's basketball team =

American college basketball season

1991–92 Pepperdine Waves men's basketball

WCC Regular season champions WCC tournament champions

NCAA tournament
- Conference: West Coast Conference
- Record: 24–7 (14–0 WCC)
- Head coach: Tom Asbury (4th season)
- Home arena: Firestone Fieldhouse

1991–92 West Coast Conference men's basketball standings
	Conf.				Overall
Team	W		L	PCT	W		L	PCT
Pepperdine †	14	–	0	1.000	24	–	7	.774
Santa Clara	9	–	5	.643	14	–	15	.483
Loyola Marymount	8	–	6	.571	15	–	13	.536
Gonzaga	8	–	6	.571	20	–	10	.667
San Diego	6	–	8	.429	14	–	14	.500
San Francisco	4	–	10	.286	13	–	16	.448
Saint Mary's (CA)	4	–	10	.286	13	–	17	.433
Portland	3	–	11	.214	10	–	18	.357
† Conference tournament winner Rankings from AP poll

The 1991–92 Pepperdine Waves men's basketball team represented Pepperdine University in the 1991–92 NCAA Division I men's basketball season. The team was led by head coach Tom Asbury. The Waves played their home games at the Firestone Fieldhouse and were members of the West Coast Conference. They finished the season 24–7, 14–0 in WCC play to win the regular season conference title by a 5-game margin. After completing an unbeaten record in the conference regular season, Pepperdine ran their conference winning streak to 27 consecutive games (33 games when including WCC Tournament play) and won the West Coast Conference tournament to receive the conference's automatic bid to the NCAA tournament for the second straight season. In the opening round, the Waves fell to Memphis State, 80–70.

== Roster ==
1991–92 Pepperdine Waves men's basketball team
Players
Coaches

Pos.	#	Name	Height	Weight	Year	Previous school	Hometown
F	10	Steve Guild	6 ft 6 in (1.98 m)	—	So	Marina	Huntington Beach, California
G		Steve Clover	6 ft 4 in (1.93 m)	—		Rolling Hills	Rancho Palos Verdes, California
G	12	Damin Lopez	5 ft 9 in (1.75 m)	—	RS So	Apollo	Glendale, Arizona
G	15	Rick Welch	6 ft 0 in (1.83 m)	—	Sr	Westlake	Westlake Village, California
F	21	Dana Jones	6 ft 7 in (2.01 m)	—	So	North Hollywood	Los Angeles, California
F	34	Geoff Lear	6 ft 8 in (2.03 m)	—	Sr	Bishop Amat	West Covina, California
G	35	Doug Christie	6 ft 6 in (1.98 m)	190 lb (86 kg)	Sr	Rainier Beach	Seattle, Washington
F	41	Byron Jenson	6 ft 7 in (2.01 m)	—	RS Jr	UTSA	Tucson, Arizona
C	52	Derek Noether	6 ft 8 in (2.03 m)	—	So	Clovis West	Fresno, California

Head coach

- Tom Asbury (Wyoming)

Assistant coach(es)

Legend

- (C) Team captain
- (S) Suspended
- (I) Ineligible
- (W) Walk-on
- Injured
- Current redshirt

== Schedule and results ==
Date time, TV	Rank^{#}	Opponent^{#}	Result	Record	Site (attendance) city, state
Non-conference regular season
Nov 23, 1991*		at Jacksonville	W 84–64	1–0	Jacksonville Memorial Coliseum; Jacksonville, Florida
Nov 26, 1991*		Cal State Dominguez Hills	W 83–54	2–0	Firestone Fieldhouse; Malibu, California
Nov 30, 1991*		Boise State	W 70–48	3–0	Firestone Fieldhouse; Malibu, California
Dec 3, 1991*		Nevada	W 93–72	4–0	Firestone Fieldhouse; Malibu, California
Dec 7, 1991*		at No. 2 UCLA	L 58–98	4–1	Pauley Pavilion; Los Angeles, California
Dec 12, 1991*		at Cal State Fullerton	W 79–69	5–1	Titan Gym; Fullerton, California
Dec 14, 1991*		Montana	L 88–89 ^{3OT}	5–2	Firestone Fieldhouse; Malibu, California
Dec 20, 1991*		vs. Georgia Southern; UAB Invitational	L 73–79	5–3	Birmingham, Alabama
Dec 21, 1991*		vs. Texas State; UAB Invitational	W 59–37	6–3	Birmingham, Alabama
Dec 28, 1991*		Cal Poly	L 72–76 ^{OT}	6–4	Firestone Fieldhouse; Malibu, California
Dec 30, 1991*		Lafayette	W 76–63	7–4	Firestone Fieldhouse; Malibu, California
Jan 2, 1992*		at No. 4 Kansas	L 73–79 ^{OT}	7–5	Allen Fieldhouse; Lawrence, Kansas
WCC Regular Season
Jan 11, 1992		Loyola Marymount	W 94–84	8–5 (1–0)	Firestone Fieldhouse; Malibu, California
Jan 16, 1992		at Gonzaga	W 68–66	9–5 (2–0)	The Kennel; Spokane, Washington
Jan 18, 1992		at Portland	W 94–73	10–5 (3–0)	Chiles Center; Portland, Oregon
Jan 24, 1992		San Francisco	W 77–64	11–5 (4–0)	Firestone Fieldhouse; Malibu, California
Jan 25, 1992		Saint Mary's	W 69–52	12–5 (5–0)	Firestone Fieldhouse; Malibu, California
Jan 27, 1992*		at UC Santa Barbara	L 56–64	12–6	The Thunderdome; Santa Barbara, California
Jan 31, 1992		at Saint Mary's	W 76–64	13–6 (6–0)	McKeon Pavilion; Moraga, California
Feb 1, 1992		at San Francisco	W 68–62	14–6 (7–0)	War Memorial Gymnasium; San Francisco, California
Feb 7, 1992		Santa Clara	W 75–53	15–6 (8–0)	Firestone Fieldhouse; Malibu, California
Feb 8, 1992		San Diego	W 71–58	16–6 (9–0)	Firestone Fieldhouse; Malibu, California
Feb 13, 1992		at San Diego	W 79–67	17–6 (10–0)	USD Sports Center; San Diego, California
Feb 15, 1992		at Santa Clara	W 52–48	18–6 (11–0)	Leavey Center; Santa Clara, California
Feb 22, 1992		at Loyola Marymount	W 103–89	19–6 (12–0)	Gersten Pavilion; Los Angeles, California
Feb 28, 1992		Portland	W 79–56	20–6 (13–0)	Firestone Fieldhouse; Malibu, California
Feb 29, 1992		Gonzaga	W 75–63	21–6 (14–0)	Firestone Fieldhouse; Malibu, California
WCC tournament
Mar 7, 1992*		at Portland; WCC Tournament Quarterfinal	W 97–83	22–6	Chiles Center; Portland, Oregon
Mar 8, 1992*		vs. San Francisco; WCC Tournament Semifinal	W 67–65	23–6	Chiles Center; Portland, Oregon
Mar 9, 1992*		vs. Gonzaga; WCC tournament championship	W 73–70	24–6	Chiles Center; Portland, Oregon
NCAA tournament
Mar 19, 1992*	(11 MW)	vs. (6 MW) Memphis State; First Round	L 70–80	24–7	Bradley Center; Milwaukee, Wisconsin
*Non-conference game. ^{#}Rankings from AP Poll. (#) Tournament seedings in parentheses. MW=Midwest.

== Awards and honors ==
- Doug Christie – WCC Player of the Year
- Tom Asbury – WCC Coach of the Year
