= 1990–91 BYU Cougars men's basketball team =

American college basketball season

1990–91 BYU Cougars men's basketball

WAC tournament champions

NCAA tournament, Round of 32
- Conference: Western Athletic Conference
- Record: 21–13 (11–5 WAC)
- Head coach: Roger Reid (2nd season)
- Home arena: Marriott Center

1990–91 WAC men's basketball standings
	Conf.				Overall
Team	W		L	PCT	W		L	PCT
No. 10 Utah	15	–	1	.938	30	–	4	.882
BYU †	11	–	5	.688	21	–	13	.618
New Mexico	10	–	6	.625	20	–	10	.667
Wyoming	8	–	8	.500	20	–	12	.625
UTEP	7	–	9	.438	16	–	13	.552
Hawaii	7	–	9	.438	16	–	13	.552
Colorado State	6	–	10	.375	15	–	14	.517
San Diego State	6	–	10	.375	13	–	16	.448
Air Force	2	–	14	.125	9	–	20	.310
† 1991 WAC tournament winner Rankings from AP Poll

The 1990–91 BYU Cougars men's basketball team represented Brigham Young University in the 1990–91 basketball season. Led by head coach Roger Reid, and freshman star Shawn Bradley, the Cougars won their first WAC title, and made their first tournament appearance under Reid. Throughout the season, the 7 foot 6 inch Bradley gathered national attention, winning WAC freshman of the year. In the NCAA tournament, the Cougars defeated Virginia in the first round, before falling to Arizona in the Round of 32. Following this season, after taking two years off serving an LDS mission, Bradley would declare his eligibility for the NBA draft, becoming the second overall pick in 1993.

== Postseason schedule ==
WAC Tournament
First Round Vs. Colorado State, Arena-Auditorium, Laramie, WY - W, 69-56
Semifinal Vs. Hawaii, Arena-Auditorium, Laramie, WY - W, 73-71 OT
Final Vs. Utah, Arena-Auditorium, Laramie, WY - W, 51-49 OT
NCAA Tournament
First Round Vs. Virginia, Huntsman Center, Salt Lake City, UT - W, 61-48
Round of 32 Vs. Arizona, Huntsman Center, Salt Lake City, UT - L, 61-76
