= 1990–91 Notre Dame Fighting Irish men's basketball team =

American college basketball season

1990–91 Notre Dame Fighting Irish men's basketball
- Conference: Independent
- Record: 12–20
- Head coach: Digger Phelps (20th season)
- Assistant coach: Fran McCaffery (3rd season)
- Captain: Tim Singleton
- Home arena: Joyce Center

1990–91 NCAA Division I men's basketball independents standings
	Conf.				Overall
Team	W		L	PCT	W		L	PCT
No. 24 DePaul	-	–	-	–	20	–	9	.690
Wright State	-	–	-	–	19	–	9	.679
Milwaukee	-	–	-	–	18	–	10	.643
Southern Utah	-	–	-	–	16	–	12	.571
Missouri–Kansas City	-	–	-	–	15	–	14	.517
Youngstown State	-	–	-	–	12	–	16	.429
Brooklyn	-	–	-	–	11	–	16	.407
Notre Dame	-	–	-	–	12	–	20	.375
Miami (FL)	-	–	-	–	9	–	19	.321
Southeastern Louisiana	-	–	-	–	9	–	19	.321
Cal State Northridge	-	–	-	–	8	–	20	.286
Florida International	-	–	-	–	6	–	22	.214
Liberty	-	–	-	–	5	–	23	.179
Chicago State	-	–	-	–	4	–	24	.143
Nicholls State	-	–	-	–	3	–	25	.107
Northeastern Illinois	-	–	-	–	2	–	25	.074
US International	-	–	-	–	2	–	26	.071
Rankings from AP Poll

The 1990–91 Notre Dame Fighting Irish men's basketball team represented the University of Notre Dame during the 1990-91 college basketball season. It was the final season with Digger Phelps as head coach of the Irish. Notre Dame finished with an overall record of 12–20. It was their first losing season since the 1981–82 season.

== Roster ==
1990–91 Notre Dame Fighting Irish men's basketball team
Players
Coaches

Pos.	#	Name	Height	Weight	Year	Hometown
PG	12	Elmer Bennett	6 ft 0 in (1.83 m)	165 lb (75 kg)	Jr	Bellaire, Texas
PF	20	LaPhonso Ellis	6 ft 8 in (2.03 m)	230 lb (104 kg)	Jr	East St. Louis, Illinois
C	43	Keith Tower	6 ft 11 in (2.11 m)	240 lb (109 kg)	Jr	Coraopolis, Pennsylvania

Head coach

- Digger Phelps (Rider)

Assistant coach(es)

Legend

- (C) Team captain
- (S) Suspended
- (I) Ineligible
- (W) Walk-on
- Injured
- Current redshirt

== Schedule and results ==
Date time, TV	Rank^{#}	Opponent^{#}	Result	Record	Site city, state
November 14 no, no		Fordham	W 56–46	1-0	Joyce Center; South Bend, IN
November 16 no, no		Iowa	W 77–68	2-0	Joyce Center; South Bend, IN
November 21 no, no		vs. No. 3/NR Arizona	L 61–91	2-1	Madison Square Garden; New York, NY
November 23 no, no		vs. No. 8/NR Duke	L 77–85	2-2	Madison Square Garden; New York, NY
November 28 no, no		No. 10/11 Indiana	L 67–70	2-3	Joyce Center; South Bend, IN
December 1 no, no		vs. Kentucky; Big Four Classic	L 90–98	2-4	RCA Dome; Indianapolis, IN
December 3 no, no		at Butler	L 77–91	2-5	Indianapolis, IN
December 8 no, no		at No. 8/7T UCLA	L 91–99	2-6	Pauley Pavilion; Los Angeles, CA
December 12 no, no		USC	L 95–105	2-7	Joyce Center; South Bend, IN
December 22 no, no		Portland	W 84–61	3-7	Joyce Center; South Bend, IN
January 2 no, no		Valparaiso	W 66–50	4-7	Joyce Center; South Bend, IN
January 5 no, no		vs. No. 7/7 North Carolina	L 47–82	4-8	East Rutherford, NJ
January 10 no, no		at Wichita State	L 50–60	4-9	Wichita, KS
January 12 no, no		at Miami (FL)	W 60–52	5-9	Miami, FL
January 15 no, no		at West Virginia	W 84–70	6-9	Morgantown, WV
January 17 no, no		Marquette	W 80–73	7-9	Joyce Center; South Bend, IN
January 22 no, no		Rutgers	L 52–62	7-10	Joyce Center; South Bend, IN
January 26 no, no		No. 18/21 Virginia	L 67–68	7-11	Joyce Center; South Bend, IN
January 29 no, no		at Dayton	W 73–67	8-11	Dayton, OH
January 31 no, no		Boston College	L 77–79	8-12	Joyce Center; South Bend, IN
February 2 no, no		No. 7/7 Duke	L 77–90	8-13	Joyce Center; South Bend, IN
February 6 no, no		La Salle	W 84–68	9-13	Joyce Center; South Bend, IN
February 9 no, no		No. 7/8 Syracuse	L 69–70	9-14	Joyce Center; South Bend, IN
February 12 no, no		at Marquette	W 63–62	10-14	Bradley Center; Milwaukee, WI
February 16 no, no		vs. Temple	L 46–70	10-15	Hershey Arena; Hershey, PA
February 18 no, no		Creighton	L 67–90	10-16	Joyce Center; South Bend, IN
February 20 no, no		DePaul	W 80–77 ^{OT}	11-16	Joyce Center; South Bend, IN
February 23 no, no		at No. 18/16 St. John's	L 55–57	11-17	Madison Square Garden; New York, NY
February 26 no, no		Dayton	W 92–87 ^{OT}	12-17	Joyce Center; South Bend, IN
March 2 no, no		at Louisville	L 59–65	12-18	Louisville, KY
March 4 no, no		at Missouri	L 54–84	12-19	Hearnes Center; Columbia, MO
March 9 no, no		at DePaul	L 56–80	12-20	Chicago, IL
*Non-conference game. ^{#}Rankings from AP Poll/UPI Poll. (#) Tournament seedings in parentheses.
