= 1993–94 Gonzaga Bulldogs men's basketball team =

American college basketball season

1993–94 Gonzaga Bulldogs men's basketball

WCC regular season champion

National Invitation Tournament, Second round
- Conference: West Coast Conference
- Record: 22–8 (12–2 WCC)
- Head coach: Dan Fitzgerald (12th season)
- Assistant coaches: Dan Monson (6th season); Mark Few (5th season); Bill Grier (3rd season)
- Home arena: Charlotte Y. Martin Centre

The 1993–94 Gonzaga Bulldogs men's basketball team represented Gonzaga University in the West Coast Conference (WCC) during the 1993–94 NCAA Division I men's basketball season. Led by twelfth-year head coach Dan Fitzgerald, the Bulldogs were 20–6 (.769) overall in the regular season (12–2 in WCC, first), and played their home games on campus at the Charlotte Y. Martin Centre in Spokane, Washington.

Regular season champion Gonzaga advanced to the semifinals of the WCC tournament at Santa Clara, but were upset by fourth seed San Diego.

Eleven days later in the National Invitation Tournament (NIT), the Bulldogs traveled south and won at Stanford. Next was at Kansas State in the second round, but the Zags lost by two points to finish at 22–8 (.733).

== Postseason results ==
Date time, TV	Rank^{#}	Opponent^{#}	Result	Record	Site (attendance) city, state
WCC Tournament
Sat, March 5; 6:00 pm	(1)	vs. (8) Loyola Marymount; Quarterfinal	W 91–76	21–6	Toso Pavilion; Santa Clara, California
Sun, March 6	(1)	vs. (4) San Diego; Semifinal	L 75–83	21–7	Toso Pavilion; Santa Clara, California
National Invitation Tournament
Thu, March 17; 7:30 pm		at Stanford; First round	W 80–76	22–7	Maples Pavilion (2,289); Stanford, California
Tue, March 22; 5:00 pm		at Kansas State; Second round	L 64–66	22–8	Bramlage Coliseum (4,782); Manhattan, Kansas
*Non-conference game. ^{#}Rankings from AP poll. (#) Tournament seedings in parentheses. All times are in Pacific time.
