= 1990–91 Big East Conference men's basketball season =

American college basketball season

1990–91 Big East Conference Men's Basketball Season
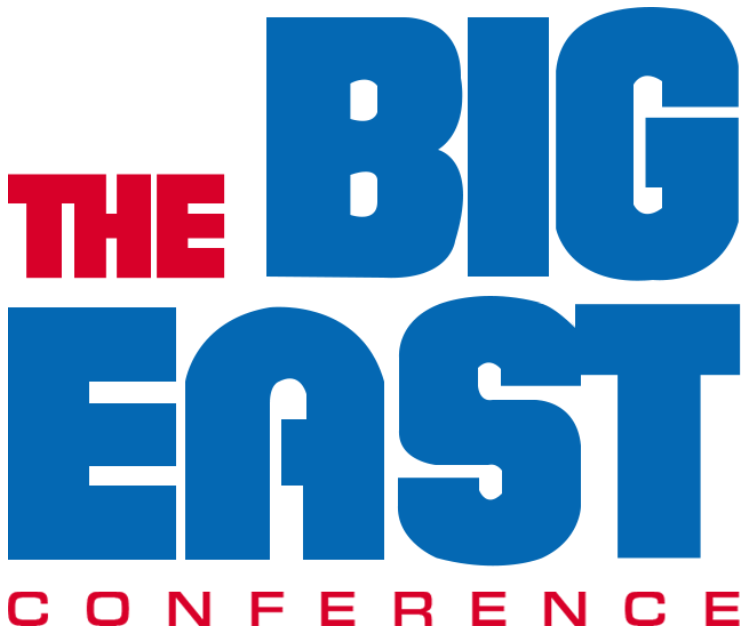
- League: NCAA Division I
- Sport: Basketball
- Duration: November 23, 1990 through March 10, 1991
- Teams: 9
- TV partner: ESPN

Regular Season
- Champion: Syracuse (12–4)
- Season MVP: Billy Owens – Syracuse

Tournament
- Champions: Seton Hall
- Finals MVP: Oliver Taylor – Seton Hall

Basketball seasons
- 1989–90 1991–92

1990–91 Big East men's basketball standings
	Conf.				Overall
Team	W		L	PCT	W		L	PCT
No. 7 Syracuse	12	–	4	.750	26	–	6	.813
No. 20 St. John's	10	–	6	.625	23	–	9	.719
Connecticut	9	–	7	.563	20	–	11	.645
No. 13 Seton Hall †	9	–	7	.563	25	–	9	.735
Pittsburgh	9	–	7	.563	21	–	12	.636
Georgetown	8	–	8	.500	19	–	13	.594
Providence	7	–	9	.438	19	–	13	.594
Villanova	7	–	9	.438	17	–	15	.531
Boston College	1	–	15	.063	11	–	19	.367
† 1991 Big East tournament winner As of April 1, 1991; Rankings from AP Poll

The 1990–91 Big East Conference men's basketball season was the 12th in conference history, and involved its nine full-time member schools.

Syracuse was the regular-season champion with a record of 12–4. Seton Hall won the Big East tournament championship.

== Season summary & highlights ==
- Syracuse was the regular-season co-champion with a record of 12–4. It was Syracuse's fifth regular-season championship or co-championship and first outright championship.
- Seton Hall won its first Big East tournament championship.
- The Georgetown-Syracuse game at the Carrier Dome on the campus of Syracuse University on March 3, 1991, drew 33,048 people, the largest on-campus crowd to witness a basketball game in National Collegiate Athletic Association (NCAA) history at the time.
- Syracuse lost to Richmond in the first round of the 1991 NCAA Tournament, becoming the first No. 2 seed to lose to a No. 15 seed in the tournament's history.

== Head coaches ==
School	Coach	Season	Notes
Boston College	Jim O'Brien	5th	
Connecticut	Jim Calhoun	5th	
Georgetown	John Thompson, Jr.	19th	
Pittsburgh	Paul Evans	5th	
Providence	Rick Barnes	3rd	
St. John's	Lou Carnesecca	21st	
Seton Hall	P. J. Carlesimo	9th	
Syracuse	Jim Boeheim	15th	Big East Coach of the Year (2nd award)
Villanova	Rollie Massimino	16th	

== Rankings ==
Syracuse was ranked in the Top 25 of the Associated Press poll all season, debuting at No. 13 preseason but after that never dropping below No. 8 and spending four weeks at No. 3. St. John's also was in the Top 25 all season. Connecticut, Georgetown, and Pittsburgh were in the Top 25 for most of the year until fading in the final weeks, and Seton Hall and Villanova also appeared in the Top 25.

1990–91 Big East Conference Weekly Rankings Key: ██ Increase in ranking. ██ Decrease in ranking.
AP Poll	Pre	11/26	12/3	12/10	12/17	12/24	12/31	1/7	1/14	1/21	1/28	2/4	2/11	2/18	2/25	3/4	Final
Boston College																	
Connecticut	17	15	14	16	15	13	12	9	13	19							
Georgetown	9	9	6	5	12	16	15	15	19	21	18	20	18	25			
Pittsburgh	12	13	11	15	14	11	11	17	16	17	19	24	22	22	22		
Providence																	
St. John's	25	21	17	14	13	9	9	10	10	10	5	8	13	18	17	20	20
Seton Hall									25		25			24	20	21	13
Syracuse	13	7	4	3	3	3	3	8	8	6	8	7	7	5	6	4	7
Villanova		24															

== Regular-season statistical leaders ==
Scoring
Name	School	PPG
Eric Murdock	Prov	25.6
Billy Owens	Syr	23.2
Malik Sealy	SJU	22.1
Terry Dehere	SHU	19.8
Dave Johnson	Syr	19.4

Rebounding
Name	School	RPG
Dikembe Mutombo	GU	12.2
Billy Owens	Syr	11.6
Anthony Avent	SHU	9.9
Marques Bragg	Prov	8.8
Rod Sellers	Conn	8.0

Assists
Name	School	APG
Jason Buchanan	SJU	5.9
Adrian Autry	Syr	5.3
Darelle Porter	Pitt	5.1
Sean Miller	Pitt	4.8
Eric Murdock	Prov	4.6

Steals
Name	School	SPG
Scott Burrell	Conn	3.6
Eric Murdock	Prov	3.5
Billy Owens	Syr	2.4
Jason Buchanan	SJU	2.2
Malik Sealy	SJU	2.1

Blocks
Name	School	BPG
Dikembe Mutombo	GU	4.7
LeRon Ellis	Syr	2.5
Robert Werdann	SJU	1.9
Conrad McRae	Syr	1.3
Scott Burrell	Conn	1.3

Field Goals
Name	School	FG%
Marques Bragg	Prov	.596
Dikembe Mutombo	GU	.586
Anthony Avent	SHU	.577
Billy Owens	Syr	.509
Dave Johnson	Syr	.499

3-Pt Field Goals
Name	School	3FG%
Jason Matthews	Pitt	.442
Terry Dehere	SHU	.429
(no other qualifiers)

Free Throws
Name	School	FT%
Jason Matthews	Pitt	.860
Terry Dehere	SHU	.839
Greg Woodard	Vill	.835
Eric Murdock	Prov	.812
Jason Buchanan	SJU	.788

== Postseason ==
=== Big East tournament ===
==== Seeding ====
Seeding in the Big East tournament was based on conference record, with tiebreakers applied as necessary. The eighth- and ninth-seeded teams played a first-round game, and the other seven teams received a bye into the quarterfinals.

The tournament's seeding was as follows: (1) Syracuse, (2) St. John's, (3) Connecticut, (4) Seton Hall, (5) Pittsburgh, (6) Georgetown, (7) Providence, (8) Villanova, (9) Boston College.

==== Bracket ====
First round March 7, 1991
8	Villanova	74
9	Boston College	73

Quarterfinals; March 8, 1991
1	#4 Syracuse	68
8	Villanova	70
4	#21 Seton Hall	70
5	Pittsburgh	69
3	Connecticut	49
6	Georgetown	68
2	#20 St. John's	64
7	Providence	72

Semifinals; March 9, 1991
8	Villanova	72
4	#21 Seton Hall	74
6	Georgetown	71
7	Providence	55

Championship Game; March 10, 1991
4	#21 Seton Hall	74
6	Georgetown	62

=== NCAA tournament ===
Seven Big East teams received bids to the NCAA Tournament. Syracuse lost in the first round and Georgetown, Pittsburgh, and Villanova in the second round. Connecticut was defeated in the regional semifinals and Seton Hall and St. John's in the regional finals.

School	Region	Seed	Round 1	Round 2	Sweet 16	Elite 8
Seton Hall	West	3	14 Pepperdine, W 71–51	11 Creighton, W 81–69	2 Arizona, W 81–77	1 UNLV, L 77–65
St. John's	Midwest	4	13 Northern Illinois, W 75–68	5 Texas, W 84–76	1 Ohio State, W 91–74	2 Duke, L 78–61
Connecticut	Midwest	11	6 LSU, W 79–62	14 Xavier, W 66–50	2 Duke, L 81–67	
Pittsburgh	Southeast	6	11 Georgia, W 76–68^{(OT)}	3 Kansas, L 77–66		
Georgetown	West	8	9 Vanderbilt, W 70–60	1 UNLV L 62–54		
Villanova	East	8	9 Princeton, W 50–48	1 North Carolina, L 84–69		
Syracuse	East	2	15 Richmond, L 73–69			

=== National Invitation Tournament ===
Providence received a bid to the National Invitation Tournament, which did not yet have seeding. The Friars lost in the quarterfinals.

School	Round 1	Round 2	Quarterfinals
Providence	James Madison, W 98–93	West Virginia, W 85–79	Oklahoma, L 83–74

== Awards and honors ==
=== Big East Conference ===
Player of the Year:

- * Billy Owens, Syracuse, F, Jr.

Defensive Player of the Year:

- Dikembe Mutombo, Georgetown, C, Sr.

Rookie of the Year:

- Bill Curley, Boston College, F, Fr.

Coach of the Year:

- Jim Boeheim, Syracuse (15th season)

All-Big East First Team

- Dikembe Mutombo, Georgetown, C, Sr., 7 ft 2 in (218 cm), 260 lb (118 kg), Léopoldville, Congo
- Eric Murdock, Providence, G, Sr., 6 ft 1 in (185 cm), 190 lb (86 kg), Somerville, N.J.
- Terry Dehere, Seton Hall, G, So., 6 ft 2 in (188 cm), 190 lb (86 kg), Jersey City, N.J.
- Malik Sealy, St. John's, F, Jr., 6 ft 8 in (203 cm), 200 lb (91 kg), The Bronx, N.Y.
- Billy Owens, Syracuse, F, Jr., 6 ft 8 in (203 cm), 220 lb (100 kg), Carlisle, Pa.

All-Big East Second Team:

- Chris Smith, Connecticut, G, Jr., 5 ft 11 in (180 cm), 163 lb (74 kg), Bridgeport, Conn.
- Anthony Avent, Seton Hall, F, Sr., 6 ft 9 in (206 cm), 235 lb (107 kg), Rocky Mount, N.C.
- Jason Buchanan, St. John's, G, Jr., 6 ft 2 in (188 cm), Syracuse, N.Y.
- Dave Johnson, Connecticut, F, Jr., 6 ft 7 in (201 cm), 210 lb (95 kg), Morgan City, La.

All-Big East Third Team:

- Scott Burrell, Connecticut, G, So., 6 ft 7 in (201 cm), 218 lb (99 kg), New Haven, Conn.
- Alonzo Mourning, Georgetown, C, Jr. 6 ft 10 in (208 cm), 261 lb (118 kg), Chesapeake, Va.
- Jason Matthews, Pittsburgh, G, Sr. 6 ft 3 in (191 cm)
- Robert Werdann, St. John's, C, Jr. 6 ft 11 in (211 cm), 250 lb (113 kg), Queens, N.Y.
- Lance Miller, Villanova, F, So., 6 ft 7 in (201 cm), Bridgewater, N.J.

Big East All-Rookie Team:

- Bill Curley, Boston College, F, Fr., 6 ft 9 in (206 cm), 220 lb (100 kg), Boston, Mass.
- Charles Harrison, Georgetown, G, Fr., 6 ft 2 in (188 cm), 170 lb (77 kg), Washington, D.C.
- Robert Churchwell, Georgetown, F, Fr., 6 ft 6 in (198 cm), 200 lb (91 kg), South Bend, Ind.
- Jerry Walker, Seton Hall, F, So., 6 ft 7 in (201 cm)
- Adrian Autry, Syracuse, G, Fr., 6 ft 3 in (191 cm), 207 lb (94 kg), Monroe, N.C.

=== All-Americans ===
The following players were selected to the 1991 Associated Press All-America teams.

Consensus All-America First Team:

- Billy Owens, Syracuse, Key Stats: 23.3 ppg, 11.6 rpg, 3.5 apg, 2.4 spg, 50.9 FG%, 39.7 3P%, 744 points

Consensus All-America Second Team:

- Eric Murdock, Providence, Key Stats: 25.6 ppg, 4.6 rpg, 3.5 spg, 44.5 FG%, 35.0 3P%, 818 points

First Team All-America:

- Billy Owens, Syracuse, Key Stats: 23.3 ppg, 11.6 rpg, 3.5 apg, 2.4spg, 50.9 FG%, 39.7 3P%, 744 points

Second Team All-America:

- Eric Murdock, Providence, Key Stats: 25.6 ppg, 4.6 rpg, 3.5 spg, 44.5 FG%, 35.0 3P%, 818 points

Third Team All-America:

- Dikembe Mutombo, Georgetown, Key Stats: 15.2 ppg, 12.2 rpg, 4.7 bpg, 58.6 FG%, 487 points

AP Honorable Mention

- Anthony Avent, Seton Hall
- Alonzo Mourning, Georgetown
- Malik Sealy, St. John's
- Chris Smith, Connecticut

== See also ==
- 1990–91 NCAA Division I men's basketball season
- 1990–91 Connecticut Huskies men's basketball team
- 1990–91 Georgetown Hoyas men's basketball team
- 1990–91 Pittsburgh Panthers men's basketball team
- 1990–91 St. John's Redmen basketball team
- 1990–91 Seton Hall Pirates men's basketball team
- 1990–91 Villanova Wildcats men's basketball team
- 1990–91 Syracuse Orangemen basketball team
