= 1990–91 Syracuse Orangemen basketball team =

American college basketball season

1990–91 Syracuse Orangemen men's basketball

Big East regular season champions Maui Invitational champions

NCAA tournament, First round
- Conference: Big East Conference

Ranking
- Coaches: No. 8
- AP: No. 7
- Record: 26–6 (12–4 Big East)
- Head coach: Jim Boeheim (15th season)
- Assistant coaches: Bernie Fine (15th season); Wayne Morgan (7th season)
- Home arena: Carrier Dome

1990–91 Big East men's basketball standings
	Conf.				Overall
Team	W		L	PCT	W		L	PCT
No. 7 Syracuse	12	–	4	.750	26	–	6	.813
No. 20 St. John's	10	–	6	.625	23	–	9	.719
Connecticut	9	–	7	.563	20	–	11	.645
No. 13 Seton Hall †	9	–	7	.563	25	–	9	.735
Pittsburgh	9	–	7	.563	21	–	12	.636
Georgetown	8	–	8	.500	19	–	13	.594
Providence	7	–	9	.438	19	–	13	.594
Villanova	7	–	9	.438	17	–	15	.531
Boston College	1	–	15	.063	11	–	19	.367
† 1991 Big East tournament winner As of April 1, 1991; Rankings from AP Poll

The 1990–91 Syracuse Orangemen basketball team represented Syracuse University in the 1990–91 NCAA Division I men's basketball season. The head coach was Jim Boeheim, serving for his 15th year. The team played home games at the Carrier Dome in Syracuse, New York. The team finished with a 26–6 (12–4) record, was Big East regular season champions, and advanced to the NCAA tournament.

The team was led by Big East Player of the Year Billy Owens and senior LeRon Ellis.

== Roster ==
1990–91 Syracuse Orange men's basketball team
Players
Coaches

Pos.	#	Name	Height	Weight	Year	Hometown
PG	3	Brad Small	5 ft 8 in (1.73 m)	147 lb (67 kg)	So	Queens, New York
SF	4	Dave Johnson	6 ft 7 in (2.01 m)	200 lb (91 kg)	Jr	Morgan City, Louisiana
G	10	Chaundu Carey	6 ft 3 in (1.91 m)	174 lb (79 kg)	Sr	Schenectady, New York
PF	13	Conrad McRae	6 ft 10 in (2.08 m)	215 lb (98 kg)	So	Brooklyn, New York
PG	12	Michael Edwards	5 ft 10 in (1.78 m)	160 lb (73 kg)	So	Voorhees, New Jersey
PG	15	Adrian Autry	6 ft 4 in (1.93 m)	207 lb (94 kg)	Fr	Monroe, North Carolina
F	21	Todd Barlok	6 ft 4 in (1.93 m)	204 lb (93 kg)	Jr	Bristol, Connecticut
PG	23	Vinnie Cohen	5 ft 8 in (1.73 m)	175 lb (79 kg)	Jr	Washington, D.C.
C	24	Dave Siock	6 ft 10 in (2.08 m)	240 lb (109 kg)	So	Vestal, New York
PF	25	LeRon Ellis	6 ft 9 in (2.06 m)	215 lb (98 kg)	Sr	Los Angeles, California
SF	30	Billy Owens	6 ft 8 in (2.03 m)	205 lb (93 kg)	Jr	Carlisle, Pennsylvania
G	33	Mike Hopkins	6 ft 5 in (1.96 m)	—	So	San Mateo, California
G/F	35	Scott McCorkle	6 ft 5 in (1.96 m)	225 lb (102 kg)	Fr	Mission Viejo, California

Head coach

- Jim Boeheim (Syracuse)

Assistant coach(es)

- Bernie Fine (Syracuse)
- Wayne Morgan (St. Lawrence)

Legend

- (C) Team captain
- (S) Suspended
- (I) Ineligible
- (W) Walk-on
- Injured
- Current redshirt

Roster
Last update: 2020-Jan-25

== Schedule and results ==
Date time, TV	Rank^{#}	Opponent^{#}	Result	Record	Site city, state
Nov 23, 1990*	No. 13	vs. Toledo; Maui Invitational Quarterfinals	W 84–68	1–0	Lahaina Civic Center; Lahaina, Hawaii
Nov 24, 1990*	No. 13	vs. Iowa State; Maui Invitational Semifinals	W 83–67	2–0	Lahaina Civic Center; Lahaina, Hawaii
Nov 25, 1990*	No. 13	vs. No. 8 Indiana; Maui Invitational Championship	W 77–74	3–0	Lahaina Civic Center; Lahaina, Hawaii
Dec 1, 1990*	No. 7	Cornell	W 86–61	4–0	Carrier Dome; Syracuse, NY
Dec 4, 1990*	No. 4	NC State; ACC–Big East Challenge	W 86–79	5–0	Carrier Dome; Syracuse, NY
Dec 7, 1990*	No. 4	Alaska-Anchorage; Carrier Classic	W 103–85	6–0	Carrier Dome; Syracuse, NY
Dec 8, 1990*	No. 4	UNC Charlotte; Carrier Classic	W 113–99	7–0	Carrier Dome; Syracuse, NY
Dec 12, 1990*	No. 3	Canisius	W 92–83	8–0	Carrier Dome; Syracuse, NY
Dec 15, 1990*	No. 3	Long Beach State	W 94–79	9–0	Carrier Dome; Syracuse, NY
Dec 20, 1990*	No. 3	vs. Towson State	W 78–73	10–0	Hersheypark Arena; Hershey, PA
Dec 22, 1990*	No. 3	Illinois-Chicago	W 110–66	11–0	Carrier Dome; Syracuse, NY
Dec 29, 1990*	No. 3	Wagner	W 101–55	12–0	Carrier Dome; Syracuse, NY
Jan 2, 1991	No. 3	No. 9 St. John's	W 92–86	13–0 (1–0)	Carrier Dome; Syracuse, NY
Jan 5, 1991	No. 3	Villanova	L 66–76	13–1 (1–1)	Carrier Dome; Syracuse, NY
Jan 7, 1991	No. 3	at No. 11 Pittsburgh	L 79–93	13–2 (1–2)	Fitzgerald Field House; Pittsburgh, PA
Jan 12, 1991	No. 8	at Seton Hall	W 69–67	14–2 (2–2)	Brendan Byrne Arena; East Rutherford, NJ
Jan 16, 1991	No. 8	No. 13 Connecticut	W 81–79	15–2 (3–2)	Carrier Dome; Syracuse, NY
Jan 19, 1991	No. 8	No. 25 Seton Hall	W 78–64	16–2 (4–2)	Carrier Dome; Syracuse, NY
Jan 21, 1991	No. 8	at No. 19 Georgetown; Rivalry	W 58–56	17–2 (5–2)	Capital Centre; Landover, MD
Jan 26, 1991	No. 6	at Providence	L 82–92	17–3 (5–3)	Dunkin' Donuts Center; Providence, RI
Jan 28, 1991	No. 6	at No. 19 Connecticut	W 68–66	18–3 (6–3)	Harry A. Gampel Pavilion; Storrs, CT
Feb 2, 1991	No. 8	Boston College	W 99–87	19–3 (7–3)	Carrier Dome; Syracuse, NY
Feb 9, 1991*	No. 7	at Notre Dame	W 70–69	20–3	Joyce Center; Notre Dame, IN
Feb 12, 1991	No. 7	Providence	W 101–83	21–3 (8–3)	Carrier Dome; Syracuse, NY
Feb 16, 1991	No. 7	at Boston College	W 106–85	22–3 (9–3)	Silvio O. Conte Forum; Boston, MA
Feb 18, 1991*	No. 7	Florida State	W 88–79	23–3	Carrier Dome; Syracuse, NY
Feb 20, 1991	No. 5	at No. 18 St. John's	L 72–77	23–4 (9–4)	Madison Square Garden; New York, NY
Feb 24, 1991	No. 5	No. 22 Pittsburgh	W 89–68	24–4 (10–4)	Carrier Dome; Syracuse, NY
Feb 26, 1991	No. 6	at Villanova	W 77–63	25–4 (11–4)	The Pavilion; Philadelphia, PA
Mar 3, 1991	No. 6	Georgetown; Rivalry	W 62–58	26–4 (12–4)	Carrier Dome (33,048); Syracuse, NY
Big East tournament
Mar 8, 1991	(1) No. 4	vs. (8) Villanova; Big East tournament Quarterfinal	L 68–70	26–5	Madison Square Garden; New York, NY
NCAA tournament
Mar 14, 1991*	(2 E) No. 7	vs. (15 E) Richmond; First round	L 69–73	26–6	Cole Field House; College Park, MD
*Non-conference game. ^{#}Rankings from AP. (#) Tournament seedings in parentheses. E=East. All times are in EST.

== Rankings ==
Ranking movements Legend: ██ Increase in ranking ██ Decrease in ranking
	Week																
Poll	Pre	1	2	3	4	5	6	7	8	9	10	11	12	13	14	15	Final
AP	13	7	4	3	3	3	3	8	8	6	8	7	7	5	6	4	7
Coaches	16	7	4	3	3	4	4	8	8	7	8	8	7	5	6	4	8

== Awards and honors ==
- Billy Owens – Big East Player of the Year

== 1991 NBA draft ==
Round	Pick	Player	NBA club
1	3	Billy Owens	Sacramento Kings
1	22	LeRon Ellis	Los Angeles Clippers
