= 1990–91 St. John's Redmen basketball team =

American college basketball season

1990–91 St. John's Redmen men's basketball

Lapchick Memorial Champions Cougar Classic Champions

NCAA men's Division I tournament, Elite Eight
- Conference: Big East Conference

Ranking
- Coaches: No. 19
- AP: No. 20
- Record: 23–9 (10–6 Big East)
- Head coach: Lou Carnesecca
- Assistant coaches: Brian Mahoney; Al LoBalbo; Ron Rutledge
- Home arena: Alumni Hall; Madison Square Garden

1990–91 Big East men's basketball standings
| | Conf. | | | | Overall |
| Team | W | | L | PCT | W | | L | PCT |
|---|---|---|---|---|---|---|---|---|
| No. 7 Syracuse | 12 | – | 4 | .750 | 26 | – | 6 | .813 |
| No. 20 St. John's | 10 | – | 6 | .625 | 23 | – | 9 | .719 |
| Connecticut | 9 | – | 7 | .563 | 20 | – | 11 | .645 |
| No. 13 Seton Hall † | 9 | – | 7 | .563 | 25 | – | 9 | .735 |
| Pittsburgh | 9 | – | 7 | .563 | 21 | – | 12 | .636 |
| Georgetown | 8 | – | 8 | .500 | 19 | – | 13 | .594 |
| Providence | 7 | – | 9 | .438 | 19 | – | 13 | .594 |
| Villanova | 7 | – | 9 | .438 | 17 | – | 15 | .531 |
| Boston College | 1 | – | 15 | .063 | 11 | – | 19 | .367 |
† 1991 Big East tournament winner As of April 1, 1991; Rankings from AP Poll

The 1990–91 St. John's Redmen basketball team represented St. John's University during the 1990–91 NCAA Division I men's basketball season. The team was coached by Lou Carnesecca in his 23rd year at the school. St. John's home games are played at Alumni Hall and Madison Square Garden and the team is a member of the Big East Conference.

== Off season ==
=== Departures ===
| Name | Number | Pos. | Height | Weight | Year | Hometown | Notes |
|---|---|---|---|---|---|---|---|
| Boo Harvey | 3 | G | 5'11" | | Senior | | Graduated. Entered 1990 NBA draft |
| Darrell Aiken | 4 | G | 6'0" | | Senior | | Graduated |
| Jayson Williams | 11 | F | 6'10" | | Senior | | Graduated. Entered 1990 NBA draft |
| Barry Milhaven | 13 | G/F | 6'5" | | Senior | | Graduated |

=== Class of 1990 signees ===
College recruiting information
| Name | Hometown | School | Height | Weight | Commit date |
|---|---|---|---|---|---|
| Shawnelle Scott; C | New York, NY | All Hallows High School | 6 ft 11 in (2.11 m) | N/A | |
| Shawnelle Scott; C | Recruit ratings: No ratings found | | | | |
| Sergio Luyk; SF | Spain, Europe | University Heights Academy | 6 ft 7 in (2.01 m) | N/A | |
| Sergio Luyk; SF | Recruit ratings: No ratings found | | | | |
| Lee Green; PG | New York, NY | Cheshire Academy | 6 ft 2 in (1.88 m) | N/A | |
| Lee Green; PG | Recruit ratings: No ratings found | | | | |
Overall recruit ranking:
Note: In many cases, Scout, Rivals, 247Sports, On3, and ESPN may conflict in their listings of height and weight.; In these cases, the average was taken. ESPN grades are on a 100-point scale.; Sources: "1990 Team Ranking". Rivals.

=== Incoming transfers ===
| Name | Number | Pos. | Height | Weight | Year | Hometown | Notes |
|---|---|---|---|---|---|---|---|
| Lamont Middleton | 31 | PF | 6'6" | | Junior | Bronx, NY | Transferred from Hartford. Under NCAA transfer rules, Middleton had to redshirt for the 1990–91 season with two years of remaining eligibility. |

== Roster ==
1990–91 St. John's Red Storm men's basketball team
Players
Coaches

| Pos. | # | Name | Height | Weight | Year | Previous school | Hometown |
|---|---|---|---|---|---|---|---|
| F | 3 | Sergio Luyk | 6 ft 7 in (2.01 m) | — | Fr | University Heights | Madrid, Spain |
| G | 10 | Terence Mullin | 6 ft 0 in (1.83 m) | — | Jr | Xaverian | Brooklyn, NY |
| G | 11 | David Cain | 6 ft 0 in (1.83 m) | — | So | Adlai E. Stevenson | Bronx, NY |
| G | 12 | Jason Buchanan | 6 ft 2 in (1.88 m) | — | Jr | Nottingham | Syracuse, NY |
| G | 13 | Lee Green (I) | 6 ft 2 in (1.88 m) | — | Fr | Cheshire Academy | Bronx, NY |
| G | 30 | Carl Beckett | 6 ft 4 in (1.93 m) | — | So | Christ the King | Queens, NY |
| F | 31 | Lamont Middleton (redshirt) | 6 ft 6 in (1.98 m) | — | Jr | Walton/Hartford | Bronx, NY |
| G/F | 22 | Chucky Sproling | 6 ft 6 in (1.98 m) | — | Jr | Manual | Denver, CO |
| F | 33 | Billy Singleton | 6 ft 7 in (2.01 m) | — | Sr | Adlai E. Stevenson | Bronx, NY |
| C | 41 | Robert Werdann | 6 ft 11 in (2.11 m) | — | Jr | Archbishop Molloy | Sunnyside, NY |
| C | 42 | Shawnelle Scott | 6 ft 11 in (2.11 m) | — | Fr | All Hallows | New York, NY |
| G | 45 | Ron DeQueiroz | 6 ft 3 in (1.91 m) | — | Fr | Xaverian | Rio de Janeiro, Brazil |
| F/C | 50 | Sean Muto | 7 ft 0 in (2.13 m) | — | Sr | Mechanicsburg | Mechanicsburg, PA |
| F | 21 | Malik Sealy | 6 ft 7 in (2.01 m) | — | Jr | St. Nicholas of Tolentine | Bronx, NY |

Head coach

- Lou Carnesecca (St. John's, '50)

Assistant coach(es)

- Brian Mahoney
- Al LoBalbo
- Ron Rutledge

Legend

- (C) Team captain
- (S) Suspended
- (I) Ineligible
- (W) Walk-on
- Injured
- Current redshirt

== Schedule and results ==
| Date time, TV | Rank^{#} | Opponent^{#} | Result | Record | Site city, state |
Regular season
| 11/23/90* | No. 25 | Monmouth; Lapchick Tournament Opening Round | W 85-60 | 1-0 | Alumni Hall; Queens, NY |
| 11/24/90* | No. 25 | Central Connecticut State; Lapchick tournament championship | W 135-92 | 2-0 | Alumni Hall; Queens, NY |
| 11/30/90* | No. 21 | vs. Niagara | W 66-49 | 3-0 | Niagara Falls Convention Center; Niagara Falls, NY |
| 12/05/90* | No. 17 | vs. No. 20 Georgia Tech; ACC-Big East Challenge | W 73-72 ^{OT} | 4-0 | Capital Centre; Landover, MD |
| 12/07/90* | No. 17 | vs. George Mason; Cougar Classic Semifinal | W 76-65 | 5-0 | Marriott Center; Provo, UT |
| 12/08/90* | No. 17 | at Brigham Young; Cougar Classic Championship | W 67-62 | 6-0 | Marriott Center; Provo, UT |
| 12/11/90* | No. 14 | Brooklyn College | W 57-47 | 7-0 | Alumni Hall; Queens, NY |
| 12/15/90* | No. 14 | Howard | W 78-65 | 8-0 | Alumni Hall; Queens, NY |
| 12/22/90* | No. 13 | Fordham | W 74-62 | 9-0 | Alumni Hall; Queens, NY |
| 01/02/91 | No. 9 | at No. 3 Syracuse | L 86-92 ^{OT} | 9-1 (0-1) | Carrier Dome; Syracuse, NY |
| 01/05/91 | No. 9 | Boston College | W 75-68 | 10-1 (1-1) | Alumni Hall; Queens, NY |
| 01/09/91 | No. 10 | at Seton Hall | L 62-74 | 10-2 (1-2) | Meadowlands Arena; East Rutherford, NJ |
| 01/13/91 | No. 10 | at No. 9 Connecticut | W 72-59 | 11-2 (2-2) | Gampel Pavilion; Storrs, CT |
| 01/15/91 | No. 10 | Providence | W 85-72 ^{OT} | 12-2 (3-2) | Alumni Hall; Queens, NY |
| 01/19/91 | No. 10 | No. 16 Pittsburgh | W 73-71 | 13-2 (4-2) | Alumni Hall; Queens, NY |
| 01/22/91 | No. 10 | No. 19 Connecticut | W 65-62 | 14-2 (5-2) | Madison Square Garden; New York, NY |
| 01/26/91 | No. 10 | at Villanova | W 58-55 | 15-2 (6-2) | The Spectrum; Philadelphia, PA |
| 01/30/91 | No. 5 | at No. 18 Georgetown | L 53-59 | 15-3 (6-3) | Capital Centre; Landover, MD |
| 02/02/91 | No. 5 | No. 25 Seton Hall | W 81-65 | 16-3 (7-3) | Madison Square Garden; New York, NY |
| 02/05/91 | No. 8 | Villanova | L 51-61 | 16-4 (7-4) | Madison Square Garden; New York, NY |
| 02/09/91 | No. 8 | at Providence | L 64-75 | 16-5 (7-5) | Providence Civic Center; Providence, RI |
| 02/13/91 | No. 13 | at Boston College | W 66-60 | 17-5 (8-5) | Silvio O. Conte Forum; Chestnut Hill, MA |
| 02/16/91 | No. 13 | at No. 16 Pittsburgh | L 83-94 | 17-6 (8-6) | Fitzgerald Field House; Pittsburgh, PA |
| 02/20/91 | No. 18 | No. 5 Syracuse | W 77-72 | 18-6 (9-6) | Madison Square Garden; New York, NY |
| 02/23/91* | No. 18 | Notre Dame | W 57-55 | 19-6 | Madison Square Garden; New York, NY |
| 02/25/91 | No. 18 | No. 25 Georgetown | W 68-58 | 20-6 (10-6) | Madison Square Garden; New York, NY |
| 03/02/91* | No. 17 | at DePaul | L 69-79 | 20-7 | Rosemont Horizon; Rosemont, IL |
Big East tournament
| 03/08/91 | No. 20 | vs. Providence; Big East tournament Quarterfinal | L 64-72 | 20-8 | Madison Square Garden; New York, NY |
NCAA tournament
| 03/15/91 | No. 20 | vs. (13) Northern Illinois; NCAA first round | W 75-68 | 21-8 | University of Dayton Arena; Dayton, OH |
| 03/17/91 | No. 20 | vs. No. 23 (5) Texas; NCAA second round | W 84-76 | 22-8 | University of Dayton Arena; Dayton, OH |
| 03/22/91 | No. 20 | vs. No. 5 (1) Ohio State; NCAA regional semifinal | W 91-74 | 23-8 | Pontiac Silverdome; Pontiac, MI |
| 03/24/91 | No. 20 | vs. No. 6 (2) Duke; NCAA Regional Final | L 61-78 | 23-9 | Pontiac Silverdome; Pontiac, MI |
*Non-conference game. ^{#}Rankings from AP Poll. (#) Tournament seedings in parentheses.
