= 1990–91 Georgetown Hoyas men's basketball team =

American college basketball season

1990–91 Georgetown Hoyas men's basketball

NCAA tournament, Second Round
- Conference: Big East Conference

Ranking
- Coaches: No. 23
- Record: 19–13 (8–8 Big East)
- Head coach: John Thompson (19th season)
- Assistant coaches: Craig Esherick (9th season); Mike Riley (9th season); Mel Reid (1st season)
- Captain: Dikembe Mutombo
- Home arena: Capital Centre

1990–91 Big East men's basketball standings
| | Conf. | | | | Overall |
| Team | W | | L | PCT | W | | L | PCT |
|---|---|---|---|---|---|---|---|---|
| No. 7 Syracuse | 12 | – | 4 | .750 | 26 | – | 6 | .813 |
| No. 20 St. John's | 10 | – | 6 | .625 | 23 | – | 9 | .719 |
| Connecticut | 9 | – | 7 | .563 | 20 | – | 11 | .645 |
| No. 13 Seton Hall † | 9 | – | 7 | .563 | 25 | – | 9 | .735 |
| Pittsburgh | 9 | – | 7 | .563 | 21 | – | 12 | .636 |
| Georgetown | 8 | – | 8 | .500 | 19 | – | 13 | .594 |
| Providence | 7 | – | 9 | .438 | 19 | – | 13 | .594 |
| Villanova | 7 | – | 9 | .438 | 17 | – | 15 | .531 |
| Boston College | 1 | – | 15 | .063 | 11 | – | 19 | .367 |
† 1991 Big East tournament winner As of April 1, 1991; Rankings from AP Poll

The 1990–91 Georgetown Hoyas men's basketball team represented Georgetown University in the 1990–91 NCAA Division I college basketball season. John Thompson, coached them in his 19th season as head coach. They played their home games at the Capital Centre in Landover, Maryland. They were members of the Big East Conference and finished the season with a record of 19–13, 8–8 in Big East play. Their record earned them a bye in the first round of the 1991 Big East men's basketball tournament, and they advanced to the final before losing to Seton Hall. They were the No. 8 seed in the West Region of the 1991 NCAA Division I men's basketball tournament – the 13th of 14 consecutive Georgetown NCAA tournament appearances – and advanced to the second round before losing to West Region No. 1 seed Nevada-Las Vegas. They were ranked No. 23 in the final Coaches' Poll of the season.

== Season recap ==
Georgetown radio voice Rich Chvotkin, who had broadcast every Georgetown men's basketball game since his debut in the 1974-75 season, missed most of this season after mobilizing for six months of United States Army Reserve service during the Gulf War shortly after calling the December 5 game against Duke. He would resume his Georgetown broadcasting duties the following season.

In the season opener at Hawaii Loa, senior center and team captain Dikembe Mutombo had 32 points, 21 rebounds, and 11 blocked shots, only the second recorded triple-double in Georgetown history. Eight days later he played against his older brother Ilo Mutombo in a game against Southern Indiana, scoring only six points and pulling down nine rebounds, while Ilo had 14 points and 11 rebounds against him.

In the fourth game of the year, Mutumbo had 13 rebounds and junior center Alonzo Mourning scored 22 points and pulled down 10 rebounds against Duke in the season's fourth game. The Hoyas held Duke freshman forward Grant Hill, sophomore point guard Bobby Hurley, and junior center Christian Laettner to a combined 9-for-42 (21.4%) shooting effort from the field, the Blue Devils as a whole shot only 32% from the field, and Georgetown won 79–74. Toward the end of the game Mourning injured the arch of his foot, forcing him to miss the next nine games. Averaging 22 points per game through the first four games, he returned to action in mid-January 1991, but recovering from the injury reduced his performance until early March. He then returned to form, averaging 18.6 points and 9.5 rebounds per game over the last six games of the season. He finished the year third in scoring on the team with an average of 15.8 points per game and shooting 52.2 percent from the field and 79.3 percent from the free-throw line.

Mourning's injury problems after the Duke game meant that Mutombo had an opportunity to build on his success of the last two seasons and come to the fore as Georgetown's "big man." Previously scoring mostly on dunks, he began to take more difficult shots. Although this caused his shooting percentage from the field to drop to 58%, he led Georgetown in points scored. Against Jackson State, he shot 13-for-16 (81.3%) from the field and a perfect 8-for-8 from the free-throw line to score a career-high 34 points. In 16 straight games from December 1990 through mid-February 1991, he led the team in rebounds. He finished the season averaging 15.2 points per game.

Freshman Robert Churchwell joined the team, succeeding Jaren Jackson at small forward. He started all 32 of the team's games, averaging 8.4 points and 4.8 rebounds per game. In Big East conference play, he scored in double figures eight times and shot 47% from the field, including a 10-for-11 (90.9%) outing against Providence.

Another newcomer was freshman guard Joey Brown. The team's point guard, he also started all 32 games and had a combined 31 points and 19 assists in the first three games of the season. He led the Hoyas in both assists and steals and, although he shot only 18-for-78 (32.1%) from three-point range over the season as a whole and only 26% from the field at any distance during the last seven games of the year, he scored in double figures 13 times, including a season-high 21 points at Villanova.

With a bye in the first round of the 1991 Big East tournament, Georgetown faced Connecticut in the quarterfinals. Although shooting only 28% from the field, the Hoyas managed to win 68–49, with Mutombo scoring 13 points and pulling down 27 rebounds and Mourning shooting 15-for-16 (93.8%) from the free-throw line. Georgetown then defeated Providence in the semifinals to advance to the championship game, which the Hoyas lost to 21st-ranked Seton Hall 74–62 despite Mourning's 22-point, 13-rebound effort. It was Georgetown's first loss in the Big East tournament final in seven appearances. Mutombo had scored a combined 34 points and collected a total of 44 rebounds during the tournament.

The Hoyas were the No. 8 seed in the West Region of the 1991 NCAA Division I men's basketball tournament – the 13th of 14 consecutive Georgetown NCAA tournament appearances – and defeated Vanderbilt in the first round. In the second round, they lost to West Region No. 1 seed Nevada-Las Vegas, the second consecutive year in which they had been knocked out of the tournament in the second round. They had fallen out of the Associated Press Poll Top 25 by the end of the season, but were ranked No. 23 in the final Coaches' Poll.

Mutombo had spent his freshman year playing intramural basketball and had not joined the varsity team until his sophomore year, and he therefore had a year of collegiate eligibility left after the end of the season. However, he opted to forego a fifth year at Georgetown to graduate on time in May 1991 and move on to a 15-season professional career in the National Basketball Association. During his three seasons with the Hoyas he had averaged one block for every six and a half minutes he had played, and he left with the third-highest career blocked-shot total in school history and averaging 9.8 points and 8.6 rebounds per game. Despite having both Mutombo and Mourning on the team during those three years, Georgetown had not returned to the Final Four, largely because an unusually high number of scholarship players – 11 of 23 – transferred from Georgetown between 1987–1988 and 1992–1993, preventing the team from building a core of veterans to play with its two dominating centers. Without that core of veterans, the Mourning-Mutombo teams were unable to replicate the success of the veteran-filled Patrick Ewing teams of the early 1980s, which had reached the Final Four – and indeed the national championship game – three times in four seasons.

== Roster ==
Junior guard Ronny Thompson was the son of head coach John Thompson, Jr.

| # | Name | Height | Weight (lbs.) | Position | Class | Hometown | Previous Team(s) |
|---|---|---|---|---|---|---|---|
| 10 | Joey Brown | 5'10" | 175 | G | Fr. | Morgan City, LA, U.S. | Morgan City HS |
| 11 | Kayode Vann | 6'1" | 175 | G | Sr. | New York, NY, U.S. | Berkeley Carroll School |
| 12 | Charles Harrison | 6'2" | 170 | G | Fr. | Washington, DC, U.S. | Archbishop Carroll HS |
| 21 | Chip Simms | 6'2" | 180 | G | Jr. | New Orleans, LA, U.S. | McDonogh 35 Sr. High High School New Orleans Louisiana |
| 22 | Robert Churchwell | 6'6" | 200 | F | Fr. | South Bend, IN, U.S. | Gonzaga College HS (D.C.) |
| 24 | Vladimir Bosanac | 6'9" | 185 | F | Fr. | Belgrade, Yugoslavia | Second Economic School |
| 30 | Ronny Thompson | 6'4" | 190 | G | Jr. | Washington, DC, U.S. | Flint Hill School (Oakton, VA) |
| 33 | Alonzo Mourning | 6'10" | 240 | C | Jr. | Chesapeake, VA, U.S. | Indian River HS |
| 34 | Lamont Morgan | 6'3" | 175 | G | Fr. | Washington, DC, U.S. | Gonzaga College HS |
| 40 | Brian Kelly | 6'6" | 230 | F | Jr. | Cincinnati, OH, U.S. | Cincinnati State Technical and Community College |
| 41 | Antoine Stoudamire | 6'3" | 180 | G | So. | Portland, OR, U.S. | Jesuit HS |
| 44 | Mike Sabol | 6'7" | 210 | F | So. | Washington, DC, U.S. | Gonzaga College HS |
| 50 | Pascal Fleury | 7'2" | 220 | C | Fr. | Saint-Jean-sur-Richelieu, Quebec, Canada | Dawson College Prep |
| 55 | Dikembe Mutombo | 7'2" | 245 | C | Sr. | Kinshasa, Zaire | Institut Boboto |

== Rankings ==
Ranking movement Legend: ██ Improvement in ranking. ██ Decrease in ranking. ██ Not ranked the previous week. RV=Others receiving votes.
| Poll | Pre | Wk 1 | Wk 2 | Wk 3 | Wk 4 | Wk 5 | Wk 6 | Wk 7 | Wk 8 | Wk 9 | Wk 10 | Wk 11 | Wk 12 | Wk 13 | Wk 14 | Wk 15 | Final |
|---|---|---|---|---|---|---|---|---|---|---|---|---|---|---|---|---|---|
| AP | 9 | 9 | 6 | 5 | 12 | 16 | 15 | 15 | 19 | 21 | 18 | 20 | 18 | 25 | | | |
| Coaches | 7 | 6 | 6 | 4 | 10 | 16 | 16 | 13 | 18 | 20 | 20 | 19 | 17 | | 25 | | 23 |

== 1990–91 Schedule and results ==
The 33,048 people in attendance at the Carrier Dome for the Georgetown-Syracuse game of March 3, 1991, constituted what was then the largest on-campus crowd to witness a basketball game in National Collegiate Athletic Association (NCAA) history.

- All times are Eastern

| Date time, TV | Rank^{#} | Opponent^{#} | Result | Record | Site (attendance) city, state |
Regular Season
| Fri., Nov. 23, 1990* | No. 9 | vs. Hawaii Loa; Hawaii Loa Classic | W 110−77 | 1–0 | Kaneohe Armory (843); Kaneohe, HI |
| Sat., Nov. 24, 1990* | No. 9 | vs. Hawaii Pacific; Hawaii Loa Classic | W 72−44 | 2–0 | Kaneohe Armory (618); Kaneohe, HI |
| Sat., Dec. 1, 1990* | No. 6 | Southern Indiana | W 65−45 | 3–0 | Capital Centre (7,853); Landover, MD |
| Wed., Dec. 5, 1990* | No. 6 | No. 5 Duke; ACC−Big East Challenge | W 79−74 | 4–0 | Capital Centre (N/A); Landover, MD |
| Sat., Dec. 8, 1990* | No. 5 | at Rice | W 53−47 | 5–0 | The Summit (3,904); Houston, TX |
| Wed., Dec. 12, 1990* | No. 5 | Saint Leo | W 75–45 | 6–0 | Capital Centre (N/A); Landover, MD |
| Sat., Dec. 15, 1990* | No. 5 | Texas-El Paso | L 60–71 | 6–1 | Capital Centre (8,037); Landover, MD |
| Sat., Dec. 22, 1990* | No. 12 | vs. No. 7 Ohio State; Duel in the Desert | L 63–71 | 6–2 | Thomas & Mack Center (18,500); Paradise, NV |
| Sat., Dec. 29, 1990* | No. 16 | vs. Houston | W 63−51 | 7–2 | Florida Suncoast Dome (9,617); St. Petersburg, FL |
| Wed., Jan. 2, 1991* | No. 15 | Jackson State | W 78–54 | 8–2 | Capital Centre (6,073); Landover, MD |
| Sat., Jan. 5, 1991 | No. 15 | Seton Hall | W 73−65 | 9–2 (1–0) | Capital Centre (18,103); Landover, MD |
| Tue., Jan. 8, 1991 | No. 15 | at Providence | L 69−72 | 9–3 (1–1) | Providence Civic Center (13,201); Providence, RI |
| Sat., Jan. 12, 1991 | No. 15 | Boston College | W 61–56 | 10–3 (2–1) | Capital Centre (9,478); Landover, MD |
| Mon., Jan. 14, 1991 | No. 15 | at Villanova | L 56–65 | 10–4 (2–2) | Spectrum (17,244); Philadelphia, PA |
| Sat., Jan. 19, 1991 | No. 19 | at Boston College | W 56–49 | 11–4 (3–2) | Silvio O. Conte Forum (8,634); Chestnut Hill, MA |
| Mon., Jan. 21, 1991; 7:30 p.m. | No. 19 | No. 8 Syracuse; Rivalry | L 56–58 | 11–5 (3–3) | Capital Centre (19,035); Landover, MD |
| Sun., Jan 27, 1991 | No. 21 | at No. 17 Pittsburgh | W 83–78 | 12–5 (4–3) | Civic Arena (16,683); Pittsburgh, PA |
| Wed., Jan. 30, 1991 | No. 18 | No. 5 St. John's | W 59–53 | 13–5 (5–3) | Capital Centre (12,364); Landover, MD |
| Sun., Feb. 3, 1991* | No. 18 | DePaul | L 63–72 | 13−6 | Capital Centre (N/A); Landover, MD |
| Wed., Feb. 6, 1991 | No. 20 | at Providence | W 79–65 | 14−6 (6–3) | Capital Centre (9,103); Landover, MD |
| Sat., Feb. 9, 1991 | No. 20 | Villanova | W 71–62 ^{OT} | 15–6 (7–3) | Capital Centre (17,018); Landover, MD |
| Mon., Feb. 11, 1991 | No. 20 | at Connecticut; Rivalry | L 55–61 | 15–7 (7–4) | Hartford Civic Center (16,294); Hartford, CT |
| Sat., Feb. 16, 1991 | No. 18 | at No. 24 Seton Hall | L 50–63 | 15–8 (7–5) | Brendan Byrne Arena (18,111); East Rutherford, NJ |
| Wed., Feb. 20, 1991 | No. 25 | No. 22 Pittsburgh | L 65–78 | 15–9 (7–6) | Capital Centre (12,297); Landover, MD |
| Sat., Feb 23, 1991 | No. 25 | Connecticut; Rivalry | W 71–57 | 16–9 (8–6) | Capital Centre (17,253); Landover, MD |
| Mon., Feb. 25, 1991 | | at No. 18 St. John's | L 58–68 | 16–10 (8–7) | Madison Square Garden (14,029); New York, NY |
| Sun., Mar. 3, 1991; 12:00 noon | | at No. 6 Syracuse; Rivalry | L 58–62 | 16–11 (8–8) | Carrier Dome (33,048); Syracuse, NY |
Big East tournament
| Fri., Mar. 8, 1991 | (6) | vs. (3) Connecticut; Quarterfinals/Rivalry | W 68–49 | 17–11 | Madison Square Garden (19,081); New York, NY |
| Sat., Mar. 9, 1991 | (6) | vs. (7) Providence; Semifinals | W 71–55 | 18–11 | Madison Square Garden (19,081); New York, NY |
| Sun., Mar. 10, 1991 | (6) | vs. (4) No. 21 Seton Hall; Championship | L 62–74 | 18–12 | Madison Square Garden (19,081); New York, NY |
NCAA tournament
| Fri., Mar. 15, 1991 | (8 W) | vs. (9 W) Vanderbilt; First round | W 70–60 | 19–12 | McKale Memorial Center (13,367); Tucson, AZ |
| Sun., Mar. 17, 1991 | (8 W) | vs. (1 W) No. 1 UNLV; Second round | L 54–62 | 19–13 | McKale Memorial Center (N/A); Tucson, AZ |
*Non-conference game. ^{#}Rankings from AP Poll. (#) Tournament seedings in parentheses.
