= 1990–91 Pittsburgh Panthers men's basketball team =

American college basketball season

1990–91 Pittsburgh Panthers men's basketball

NCAA tournament, second round
- Conference: Big East Conference
- Record: 21–12 (9–7 Big East)
- Head coach: Paul Evans (5th season)
- Assistant coaches: Norm Law (5th season); Mark Coleman (5th season); John Sarandrea (3rd season)
- Home arena: Fitzgerald Field House (Capacity: 4,122); Pittsburgh Civic Arena (Capacity: 17,537)

1990–91 Big East men's basketball standings
	Conf.				Overall
Team	W		L	PCT	W		L	PCT
No. 7 Syracuse	12	–	4	.750	26	–	6	.813
No. 20 St. John's	10	–	6	.625	23	–	9	.719
Connecticut	9	–	7	.563	20	–	11	.645
No. 13 Seton Hall †	9	–	7	.563	25	–	9	.735
Pittsburgh	9	–	7	.563	21	–	12	.636
Georgetown	8	–	8	.500	19	–	13	.594
Providence	7	–	9	.438	19	–	13	.594
Villanova	7	–	9	.438	17	–	15	.531
Boston College	1	–	15	.063	11	–	19	.367
† 1991 Big East tournament winner As of April 1, 1991; Rankings from AP Poll

The 1990–91 Pittsburgh Panthers men's basketball team represented the University of Pittsburgh in the 1990–91 NCAA Division I men's basketball season. Led by head coach Paul Evans, the Panthers finished with a record of 21–12. They received an at-large bid to the 1991 NCAA Division I men's basketball tournament where they lost in the second round to Kansas.
