= 1990–91 Connecticut Huskies men's basketball team =

American college basketball season

1990–91 Connecticut Huskies men's basketball

NCAA men's Division I tournament, Sweet Sixteen
- Conference: Big East Conference
- Record: 20–11 (9–7 Big East)
- Head coach: Jim Calhoun (5th season)
- Assistant coaches: Howie Dickenman; Dave Leitao; Glen Miller; Scott Wissell
- Home arena: Hartford Civic Center; Harry A. Gampel Pavilion

1990–91 Big East men's basketball standings
	Conf.				Overall
Team	W		L	PCT	W		L	PCT
No. 7 Syracuse	12	–	4	.750	26	–	6	.813
No. 20 St. John's	10	–	6	.625	23	–	9	.719
Connecticut	9	–	7	.563	20	–	11	.645
No. 13 Seton Hall †	9	–	7	.563	25	–	9	.735
Pittsburgh	9	–	7	.563	21	–	12	.636
Georgetown	8	–	8	.500	19	–	13	.594
Providence	7	–	9	.438	19	–	13	.594
Villanova	7	–	9	.438	17	–	15	.531
Boston College	1	–	15	.063	11	–	19	.367
† 1991 Big East tournament winner As of April 1, 1991; Rankings from AP Poll

The 1990–91 Connecticut Huskies men's basketball team represented the University of Connecticut in the 1990–91 collegiate men's basketball season. The Huskies completed the season with a 20–11 overall record. The Huskies were members of the Big East Conference where they finished with a 9–7 record. They made it to the Sweet Sixteen in the 1991 NCAA Division I men's basketball tournament. The Huskies played their home games at Harry A. Gampel Pavilion in Storrs, Connecticut and the Hartford Civic Center in Hartford, Connecticut, and they were led by fifth-year head coach Jim Calhoun.

== Schedule ==
Date time, TV	Rank^{#}	Opponent^{#}	Result	Record	Site (attendance) city, state
Regular Season
11/24/1990*	No. 17	College of Charleston	W 68–52	1–0	Harry A. Gampel Pavilion (8,241); Storrs, CT
11/27/1990*	No. 15	Hartford	W 90–63	2–0	Harry A. Gampel Pavilion (8,241); Storrs, CT
11/29/1990*; WTNH	No. 15	at Yale	W 49–48	3–0	Payne Whitney Gymnasium (7,873); New Haven, CT
12/6/1990*; ESPN	No. 14	at No. 10 North Carolina; ACC/BIG EAST Challenge	L 64–79	3–1	Dean Smith Center (21,572); Chapel Hill, NC
12/9/1990*	No. 14	at Maine	W 85–60	4–1	Bangor Auditorium (4,587); Orono, ME
12/12/1990*; WTNH	No. 16	New Hampshire	W 85–32	5–1	Harry A. Gampel Pavilion (8,121); Storrs, CT
12/23/1990*	No. 15	Fairfield	W 94–70	6–1	Hartford Civic Center (16,294); Hartford, CT
12/28/1990*	No. 13	Lafayette; Connecticut Mutual Classic	W 59–57	7–1	Hartford Civic Center (16,049); Hartford, CT
12/29/1990*	No. 13	Rhode Island; Connecticut Mutual Classic	W 90–69	8–1	Hartford Civic Center (16,112); Hartford, CT
1/2/1991; WTNH	No. 12	at Boston College	W 96–70	9–1 (1–0)	Conte Forum (6,654); Boston, MA
1/5/1991; NESN	No. 12	No. 11 Pittsburgh	W 81–76	10–1 (2–0)	Hartford Civic Center (16,294); Hartford, CT
1/8/1991; WTNH	No. 9	at Villanova	W 74–71	11–1 (3–0)	The Pavilion (6,500); Villanova, PA
1/10/1991*	No. 9	Central Connecticut	W 115–47	12–1	Harry A. Gampel Pavilion (8,241); Storrs, CT
1/12/1991; CBS	No. 9	No. 10 St. John's	L 59–72	12–2 (3–1)	Harry A. Gampel Pavilion (8,241); Storrs, CT
1/16/1991; ESPN	No. 15	at No. 8 Syracuse; Rivalry	L 79–81 ^{OT}	12–3 (3–2)	Carrier Dome (29,899); Syracuse, NY
1/19/1991; WTNH	No. 15	Providence	L 102–108	12–4 (3–3)	Hartford Civic Center (16,294); Hartford, CT
1/22/1991; WTNH	No. 19	at No. 10 St. John's	L 62–65	12–5 (3–4)	Madison Square Garden (13,017); New York, NY
1/26/1991; NESN	No. 19	at Seton Hall	L 62–76	12–6 (3–5)	Brendan Byrne Arena (14,016); East Rutherford, NJ
1/28/1991; ESPN	No. 19	No. 6 Syracuse; Rivalry	L 66–68	12–7 (3–6)	Hartford Civic Center (16,294); Hartford, CT
2/2/1991; WTNH		Villanova	W 67–59	13–7 (4–6)	Harry A. Gampel Pavilion (8,241); Storrs, CT
2/5/1991; WTNH		Boston College	W 76–59	14–7 (5–6)	Harry A. Gampel Pavilion (8,241); Storrs, CT
2/11/1991; ESPN		No. 20 Georgetown; Rivalry	W 61–55	15–7 (6–6)	Hartford Civic Center (16,294); Hartford, CT
2/16/1991*; CBS		North Carolina State	L 59–60	15–8	Harry A. Gampel Pavilion (8,241); Storrs, CT
2/19/1991; WTNH		at Providence	W 70–66 ^{OT}	16–8 (7–6)	Providence Civic Center (13,106); Providence, RI
2/23/1991; CBS		at No. 25 Georgetown; Rivalry	L 57–71	16–9 (7–7)	Capital Centre (17,253); Landover, MD
2/27/1991; ESPN		No. 20 Seton Hall	W 62–60 ^{OT}	17–9 (8–7)	Harry A. Gampel Pavilion (8,241); Storrs, CT
3/2/1991; WTNH		at Pittsburgh	W 78–68	18–9 (9–7)	Civic Arena (6,798); Pittsburgh, PA
Big East tournament
3/8/1991; WTNH		vs. Georgetown; Quarterfinals/Rivalry	L 49–68	18–10	Madison Square Garden (19,081); New York, NY
NCAA tournament
3/14/1991*; CBS	No. (11)	vs. No. 22 (6) LSU; First Round	W 79–62	19–10	Hubert H. Humphrey Metrodome (25,348); Minneapolis, MN
3/16/1991*; CBS	No. (11)	vs. No. (14) Xavier; Second Round	W 66–50	20–10	Hubert H. Humphrey Metrodome (28,114); Minneapolis, MN
3/22/1991*; CBS	No. (11)	vs. No. 6 (2) Duke; Sweet Sixteen	L 67–81	20–11	Silverdome (30,461); Pontiac, MI
*Non-conference game. ^{#}Rankings from AP Poll. (#) Tournament seedings in parentheses. All times are in Eastern Time.

Schedule Source:
