= 1990–91 Seton Hall Pirates men's basketball team =

American college basketball season

1990–91 Seton Hall Pirates men's basketball

Big East tournament champions

NCAA tournament, regional final
- Conference: Big East Conference

Ranking
- Coaches: No. 11
- AP: No. 13
- Record: 25–9 (9–7 Big East)
- Head coach: P. J. Carlesimo (9th season)
- Home arena: Walsh Gymnasium; Brendan Byrne Arena

1990–91 Big East men's basketball standings
	Conf.				Overall
Team	W		L	PCT	W		L	PCT
No. 7 Syracuse	12	–	4	.750	26	–	6	.813
No. 20 St. John's	10	–	6	.625	23	–	9	.719
Connecticut	9	–	7	.563	20	–	11	.645
No. 13 Seton Hall †	9	–	7	.563	25	–	9	.735
Pittsburgh	9	–	7	.563	21	–	12	.636
Georgetown	8	–	8	.500	19	–	13	.594
Providence	7	–	9	.438	19	–	13	.594
Villanova	7	–	9	.438	17	–	15	.531
Boston College	1	–	15	.063	11	–	19	.367
† 1991 Big East tournament winner As of April 1, 1991; Rankings from AP Poll

The 1990–91 Seton Hall Pirates men's basketball team represented Seton Hall University during the 1990–91 NCAA men's college basketball season. The Pirates were led by ninth year head coach P.J. Carlesimo. The team finished with an overall record of 25–9 (9–7 Big East) Seton Hall automatically qualified for the 1991 NCAA Tournament with a 74–62 victory over Georgetown in the Big East Tournament.

As a #3 seed the Pirates defeated Pepperdine, Creighton and Arizona to advance to the Elite 8. With a spot in the Final Four Seton Hall came up short and would go on to lose to UNLV 77–65

== Roster ==
1990–91 Seton Hall Pirates men's basketball team
Players
Coaches

Pos.	#	Name	Height	Weight	Year	Previous school	Hometown
G	20	Oliver Taylor	6 ft 0 in (1.83 m)	—	Sr
F	21	Jerry Walker	6 ft 7 in (2.01 m)	—	So
F	22	Gordon Winchester	6 ft 7 in (2.01 m)	—	Jr
G	24	Terry Dehere	6 ft 2 in (1.88 m)	185 lb (84 kg)	So	St. Anthony	Jersey City, New Jersey
F/C	32	Anthony Avent	6 ft 9 in (2.06 m)	235 lb (107 kg)	Jr	Malcolm X Shabazz	Newark, New Jersey
C	50	Luther Wright	7 ft 2 in (2.18 m)	250 lb (113 kg)	Fr	Elizabeth HS	Jersey City, New Jersey
F	55	Artūras Karnišovas	6 ft 8 in (2.03 m)	220 lb (100 kg)	Fr

Head coach

- P. J. Carlesimo

Assistant coach(es)

Legend

- (C) Team captain
- (S) Suspended
- (I) Ineligible
- (W) Walk-on
- Injured
- Current redshirt

Roster
Last update: 2019-Apr-19

== Schedule and results ==
Date time, TV	Rank^{#}	Opponent^{#}	Result	Record	Site (attendance) city, state
Regular season
Nov 24, 1990*		Iona	W 79–69	1–0	Walsh Gymnasium; South Orange, New Jersey
Nov 28, 1990*		at Fordham	L 68–69	1–1	Rose Hill Gym; Bronx, New York
Dec 1, 1990*		New Hampshire College	W 106–69	2–1	Walsh Gymnasium; South Orange, New Jersey
Dec 4, 1990*		vs. Clemson; ACC–Big East Challenge	W 78–62	3–1	Carrier Dome; Syracuse, New York
Dec 9, 1990*		Long Island University	W 107–54	4–1	Walsh Gymnasium; South Orange, New Jersey
Dec 12, 1990		at Villanova	W 81–77	5–1 (1–0)	The Pavilion; Philadelphia, Pennsylvania
Dec 22, 1990*		Rutgers	W 90–76	6–1	Brendan Byrne Arena; East Rutherford, New Jersey
Dec 27, 1990*		North Carolina A&T	W 103–77	7–1	Walsh Gymnasium; South Orange, New Jersey
Dec 29, 1990*		Winthrop	W 106–49	8–1	Walsh Gymnasium; South Orange, New Jersey
Jan 2, 1991		Providence	W 97–92	9–1 (2–0)	Brendan Byrne Arena; East Rutherford, New Jersey
Jan 5, 1991		at No. 15 Georgetown	L 65–73	9–2 (2–1)	Capital Centre; Washington, D.C.
Jan 9, 1991		No. 10 St. John's	W 74–62	10–2 (3–1)	Brendan Byrne Arena; East Rutherford, New Jersey
Jan 12, 1991		No. 8 Syracuse	L 67–69	10–3 (3–2)	Brendan Byrne Arena; East Rutherford, New Jersey
Jan 15, 1991	No. 25	at Boston College	W 71–62	11–3 (4–2)	Silvio O. Conte Forum; Boston, Massachusetts
Jan 19, 1991	No. 25	at No. 8 Syracuse	L 64–78	11–4 (4–3)	Carrier Dome; Syracuse, New York
Jan 22, 1991*		Saint Peter's	W 67–62	12–4	Brendan Byrne Arena; East Rutherford, New Jersey
Jan 26, 1991		No. 19 Connecticut	W 76–62	13–4 (5–3)	Brendan Byrne Arena; East Rutherford, New Jersey
Jan 29, 1991	No. 25	at Providence	L 62–65	13–5 (5–4)	Dunkin' Donuts Center; Providence, Rhode Island
Feb 2, 1991	No. 25	at No. 5 St. John's	L 65–81	13–6 (5–5)	Madison Square Garden; New York, New York
Feb 4, 1991		at No. 19 Pittsburgh	L 80–86	13–7 (5–6)	Fitzgerald Field House; Pittsburgh, Pennsylvania
Feb 9, 1991*		at No. 23 Oklahoma	W 92–85	14–7	Lloyd Noble Center; Norman, Oklahoma
Feb 12, 1991		No. 22 Pittsburgh	W 83–73	15–7 (6–6)	Brendan Byrne Arena; East Rutherford, New Jersey
Feb 16, 1991		No. 18 Georgetown	W 63–50	16–7 (7–6)	Brendan Byrne Arena; East Rutherford, New Jersey
Feb 19, 1991*	No. 24	Niagara	W 76–61	17–7	Brendan Byrne Arena; East Rutherford, New Jersey
Feb 23, 1991	No. 24	Villanova	W 90–73	18–7 (8–6)	Brendan Byrne Arena; East Rutherford, NJ
Feb 27, 1991	No. 20	at Connecticut	L 60–62	18–8 (8–7)	Harry A. Gampel Pavilion; Storrs, CT
Mar 2, 1991	No. 20	Boston College	W 81–74	19–8 (9–7)	Brendan Byrne Arena; East Rutherford, NJ
Big East tournament
Mar 8, 1991*	No. 21	vs. Pittsburgh; Big East tournament Quarterfinal	W 70–69	20–8	Madison Square Garden; New York, NY
Mar 9, 1991*	No. 21	vs. Villanova; Big East tournament Semifinal	W 74–72	21–8	Madison Square Garden; New York, NY
Mar 10, 1991*	No. 21	vs. Georgetown; Big East tournament championship	W 74–62	22–8	Madison Square Garden; New York, NY
NCAA Tournament
Mar 15, 1991*	(3 W) No. 13	vs. (14 W) Pepperdine; First round – West Regional	W 71–51	23–8	Jon M. Huntsman Center; Salt Lake City, UT
Mar 17, 1991*	(3 W) No. 13	vs. (11 W) Creighton; Second Round – West Regional	W 81–69	24–8	Jon M. Huntsman Center; Salt Lake City, UT
March 21, 1991*; CBS	(3 W) No. 13	vs. (2 W) No. 8 Arizona; Sweet Sixteen – West Regional semifinal	W 81–77	25–8	Kingdome; Seattle, WA
March 23, 1991*; CBS	(3 W) No. 13	vs. (1 W) No. 1 UNLV; Elite Eight – West Regional final	L 65–77	25–9	Kingdome; Seattle, WA
*Non-conference game. ^{#}Rankings from AP Poll. (#) Tournament seedings in parentheses. W=West.

== Players in the 1991 NBA draft ==
Round	Pick	Player	NBA club
1	15	Anthony Avent	Atlanta Hawks
