= 1990–91 Villanova Wildcats men's basketball team =

American college basketball season

1990–91 Villanova Wildcats men's basketball

NCAA tournament, Round of 32
- Conference: Big East Conference
- Record: 17–15 (7–9 Big East)
- Head coach: Rollie Massimino (18th season)
- Assistant coach: Jay Wright (4th season)
- Home arena: John Eleuthère du Pont Pavilion (Capacity: 6,500)

1990–91 Big East men's basketball standings
	Conf.				Overall
Team	W		L	PCT	W		L	PCT
No. 7 Syracuse	12	–	4	.750	26	–	6	.813
No. 20 St. John's	10	–	6	.625	23	–	9	.719
Connecticut	9	–	7	.563	20	–	11	.645
No. 13 Seton Hall †	9	–	7	.563	25	–	9	.735
Pittsburgh	9	–	7	.563	21	–	12	.636
Georgetown	8	–	8	.500	19	–	13	.594
Providence	7	–	9	.438	19	–	13	.594
Villanova	7	–	9	.438	17	–	15	.531
Boston College	1	–	15	.063	11	–	19	.367
† 1991 Big East tournament winner As of April 1, 1991; Rankings from AP Poll

The 1990–91 Villanova Wildcats men's basketball team represented Villanova University in the 1990–91 season. The head coach was Rollie Massimino. The team played its home games at The Pavilion in Villanova, Pennsylvania, and was a member of the Big East Conference.

== Roster ==
1990–91 Villanova Wildcats men's basketball team
Players
Coaches

Pos.	#	Name	Height	Weight	Year	Hometown
G	24	Greg Woodard	6 ft 6 in (1.98 m)	—	Jr
G		Chris Walker	5 ft 11 in (1.8 m)	—	Jr
G	21	Chris Masotti	5 ft 11 in (1.8 m)	—	Sr
G		Tim Muller	6 ft 2 in (1.88 m)	—	Sr
F	32	Marc Dowdell	6 ft 9 in (2.06 m)	—	Jr
F	14	Lance Miller	6 ft 6 in (1.98 m)	195 lb (88 kg)	So	Bridgewater, New Jersey
C		Paul Vrind	7 ft 2 in (2.18 m)	—	Jr

Head coach

- Rollie Massimino (Vermont)

Assistant coach(es)

Legend

- (C) Team captain
- (S) Suspended
- (I) Ineligible
- (W) Walk-on
- Injured
- Current redshirt

== Schedule and results ==
Date time, TV	Rank^{#}	Opponent^{#}	Result	Record	Site city, state
Regular season
Nov 24, 1990*		vs. No. 14 LSU; Tip Off Classic	W 93–91	1–0	Springfield Civic Center; Springfield, Massachusetts
Nov 26, 1990*		Drexel	W 92–71	2–0	The Pavilion; Philadelphia, Pennsylvania
Dec 1, 1990*	No. 24	Temple	L 57–70	2–1	The Pavilion; Philadelphia, Pennsylvania
Dec 4, 1990*		at Penn	W 82–62	3–1	Palestra; Philadelphia, Pennsylvania
Dec 6, 1990*		vs. Wake Forest	W 91–82	4–1	
Dec 8, 1990*		at Saint Joseph's	W 83–82	5–1	Hagan Arena; Philadelphia, Pennsylvania
Dec 12, 1990		Seton Hall	L 77–81	5–2 (0–1)	The Pavilion; Philadelphia, Pennsylvania
Dec 22, 1990*		La Salle	L 94–102	5–3	The Pavilion; Philadelphia, Pennsylvania
Dec 27, 1990*		vs. Auburn	W 88–71	6–3	
Dec 28, 1990*		vs. Georgia Tech	L 87–99	6–4	
Jan 5, 1991		at No. 3 Syracuse	W 76–66		Carrier Dome; Syracuse, New York
Jan 19, 1991*		No. 6 Arizona	L 64–72		The Pavilion; Philadelphia, Pennsylvania
Jan 26, 1991		No. 10 St. John's	L 55–58		The Spectrum; Philadelphia, Pennsylvania
Feb 5, 1991		at No. 8 St. John's	W 61–51		Madison Square Garden; New York, New York
Feb 23, 1991		at No. 24 Seton Hall	L 73–90		Brendan Byrne Arena; East Rutherford, New Jersey
Feb 26, 1991		No. 6 Syracuse	L 63–77		The Pavilion; Philadelphia, Pennsylvania
Big East tournament
Mar 7, 1991*		vs. Boston College; Big East tournament first round	W 74–73	15–13	Madison Square Garden; New York, New York
Mar 8, 1991*		vs. No. 4 Syracuse; Big East tournament Quarterfinal	W 70–68	16–13	Madison Square Garden; New York, New York
Mar 9, 1991*		vs. No. 21 Seton Hall; Big East tournament Semifinal	L 72–74	16–14	Madison Square Garden; New York, New York
NCAA tournament
Mar 15, 1991*	(9 E)	vs. (8 E) No. 18 Princeton; First Round	W 50–48	17–14	Carrier Dome; Syracuse, New York
Mar 17, 1991*	(9 E)	vs. (1 E) No. 4 North Carolina; Second Round	L 69–84	17–15	Carrier Dome; Syracuse, New York
*Non-conference game. ^{#}Rankings from AP poll. (#) Tournament seedings in parentheses. E=East. All times are in Easter Time.
