= 1991 Big East men's basketball tournament =

- Classification: Division I
- Season: 1990–91
- Teams: 9
- Site: Madison Square Garden; New York City
- Champions: Seton Hall (1st title)
- Winning coach: P. J. Carlesimo (1st title)
- MVP: Oliver Taylor (Seton Hall)

1990–91 Big East men's basketball standings
	Conf.				Overall
Team	W		L	PCT	W		L	PCT
No. 7 Syracuse	12	–	4	.750	26	–	6	.813
No. 20 St. John's	10	–	6	.625	23	–	9	.719
Connecticut	9	–	7	.563	20	–	11	.645
No. 13 Seton Hall †	9	–	7	.563	25	–	9	.735
Pittsburgh	9	–	7	.563	21	–	12	.636
Georgetown	8	–	8	.500	19	–	13	.594
Providence	7	–	9	.438	19	–	13	.594
Villanova	7	–	9	.438	17	–	15	.531
Boston College	1	–	15	.063	11	–	19	.367
† 1991 Big East tournament winner As of April 1, 1991; Rankings from AP Poll

The 1991 Big East men's basketball tournament took place at Madison Square Garden in New York City, from March 7 to March 10, 1991. Its winner received the Big East Conference's automatic bid to the 1991 NCAA tournament. It is a single-elimination tournament with four rounds. Syracuse finished with the best regular season conference record and was awarded the #1 seed.

Seton Hall defeated Georgetown in the championship game 74–62, to claim its first Big East tournament championship.

== Bracket ==
First round March 7, 1991
8	Villanova	74
9	Boston College	73

Quarterfinals; March 8, 1991
1	#4 Syracuse	68
8	Villanova	70
4	#21 Seton Hall	70
5	Pittsburgh	69
3	Connecticut	49
6	Georgetown	68
2	#20 St. John's	64
7	Providence	72

Semifinals; March 9, 1991
8	Villanova	72
4	#21 Seton Hall	74
6	Georgetown	71
7	Providence	55

Championship Game; March 10, 1991
4	#21 Seton Hall	74
6	Georgetown	62

== Awards ==
Dave Gavitt Trophy (Most Valuable Player): Oliver Taylor, Seton Hall

All Tournament Team

- Anthony Avent, Seton Hall
- Marc Dowdell, Villanova
- Alonzo Mourning, Georgetown
- Eric Murdock, Providence
- Dikembe Mutombo, Georgetown
- Oliver Taylor, Seton Hall
