= Big East Conference Men's Basketball Player of the Year =

American collegiate basketball award

- Awarded for: the most outstanding male basketball player in the Big East Conference
- Country: United States

History
- First award: 1980
- Most recent: Zuby Ejiofor, St. John's

The Big East Conference Men's Basketball Player of the Year award is given to the men's basketball player in the Big East Conference voted as the top performer by the conference coaches. It was first awarded at the end of the league's inaugural season of 1979–80.

The head coaches of the league's 11 teams submit their votes following the end of the regular season and before the conference's tournament in early March. The coaches cannot vote for their own players. A select media panel's votes are also counted.

The award was introduced following the conference's first season in 1980, in which it was presented to John Duren of Georgetown. Patrick Ewing (Georgetown), Richard Hamilton (Connecticut), Troy Bell (Boston College), Troy Murphy (Notre Dame), Kris Dunn (Providence), and Collin Gillespie (Villanova) each won the award twice, while Chris Mullin (St. John's) won three consecutive times from 1983 through 1985. Four award winners have been inducted as players to the Naismith Memorial Basketball Hall of Fame. Ewing, who shared the award in 1984 and 1985 with Mullin, was inducted in 2008 after playing 17 years in the National Basketball Association (NBA) between 1985 and 2002. Mullin followed in 2011 after a 16-year NBA career (1985–2001). Georgetown's 1992 Player of the Year Alonzo Mourning entered the Hall in 2014 following a 16-year NBA career (1992–2008). The most recent award winner to enter the Hall is Ray Allen from Connecticut, who won the Big East award in 1996 and went on to a 19-season NBA career (1996–2014), getting inducted in 2018. There have been eight ties, the most recent instance was among Collin Gillespie and Jeremiah Robinson-Earl of Villanova along with Sandro Mamukelashvili of Seton Hall (2021).

Seven players have been awarded a major national player of the year award in the same year that they received a Big East Player of the Year award. In 1985, Ewing and Mullin shared the conference award, while Ewing was named Naismith College Player of the Year and Mullin was given the John R. Wooden Award. The following year, Walter Berry of St. John's received the Wooden Award. In 1996, Allen received the conference award and was also the final recipient of the UPI Player of the Year Award. In 2004, Connecticut's Emeka Okafor won the conference award while sharing NABC Player of the Year honors with Jameer Nelson of Saint Joseph's. Creighton's Doug McDermott received all major national awards along with the conference award in 2014. Lastly, Villanova's Jalen Brunson was the consensus national player of the year in 2018.

Georgetown and Villanova are tied for the most winners with 8 selections each. The only current Big East members without a winner are Butler and Xavier, both of which joined the conference at its relaunch following its 2013 split into two leagues, and DePaul, members since 2005.

== Key ==
†	Co-Players of the Year
*	Awarded a national player of the year award that same season: UPI College Basketball Player of the Year (1954–55 to 1995–96); Oscar Robertson Trophy (1958–59 to present); Naismith College Player of the Year (1968–69 to present); John R. Wooden Award (1976–77 to present)
Player (X)	Denotes the number of times the player has been awarded the Big East Player of the Year award at that point

== Winners ==
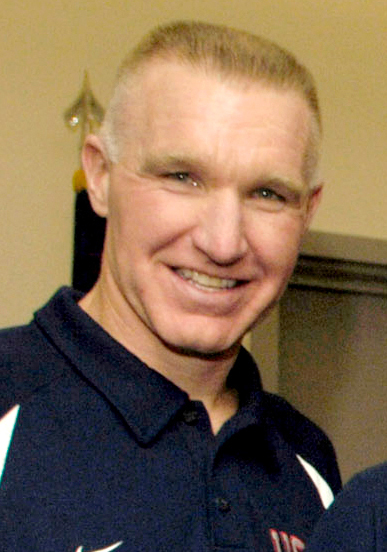
Chris Mullin, St. John's, 1983 through 1985

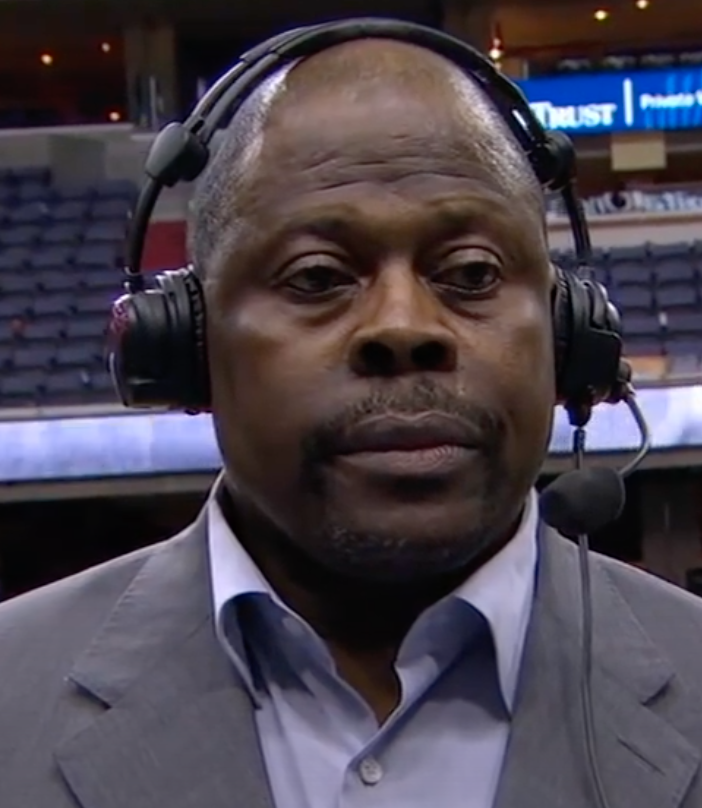
Patrick Ewing, Georgetown, 1984 and 1985

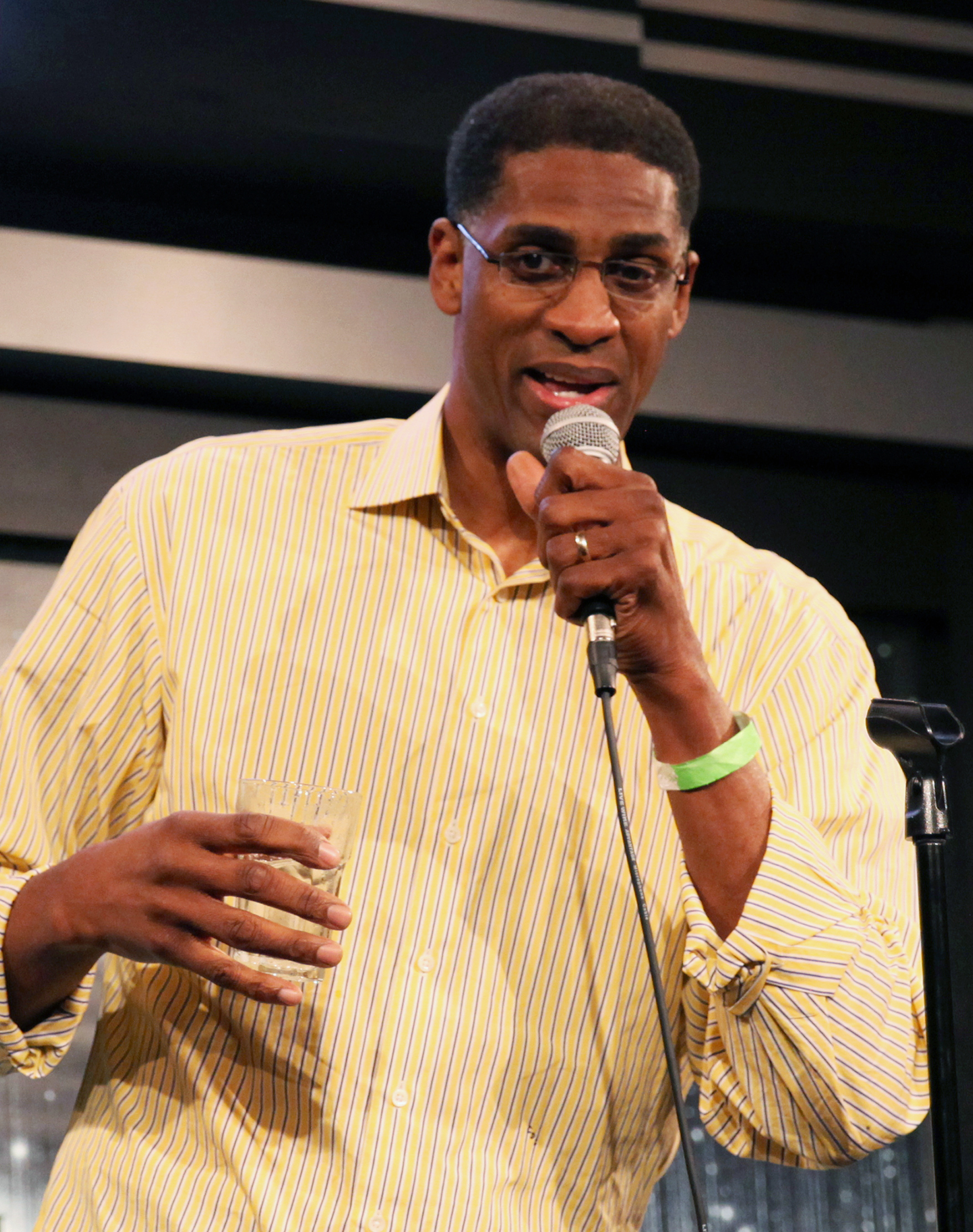
Charles Smith, Pittsburgh, 1988

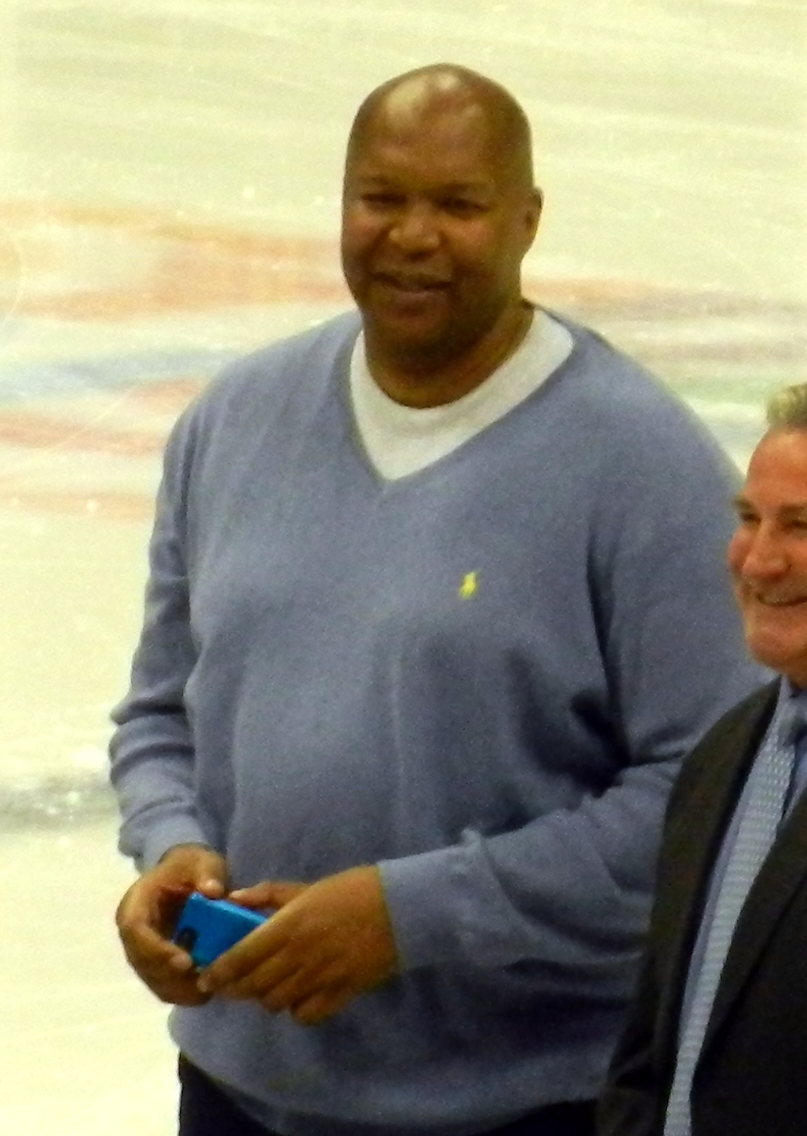
Derrick Coleman, Syracuse, 1990

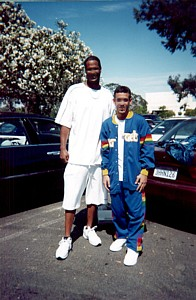
Billy Owens (left), Syracuse, 1991

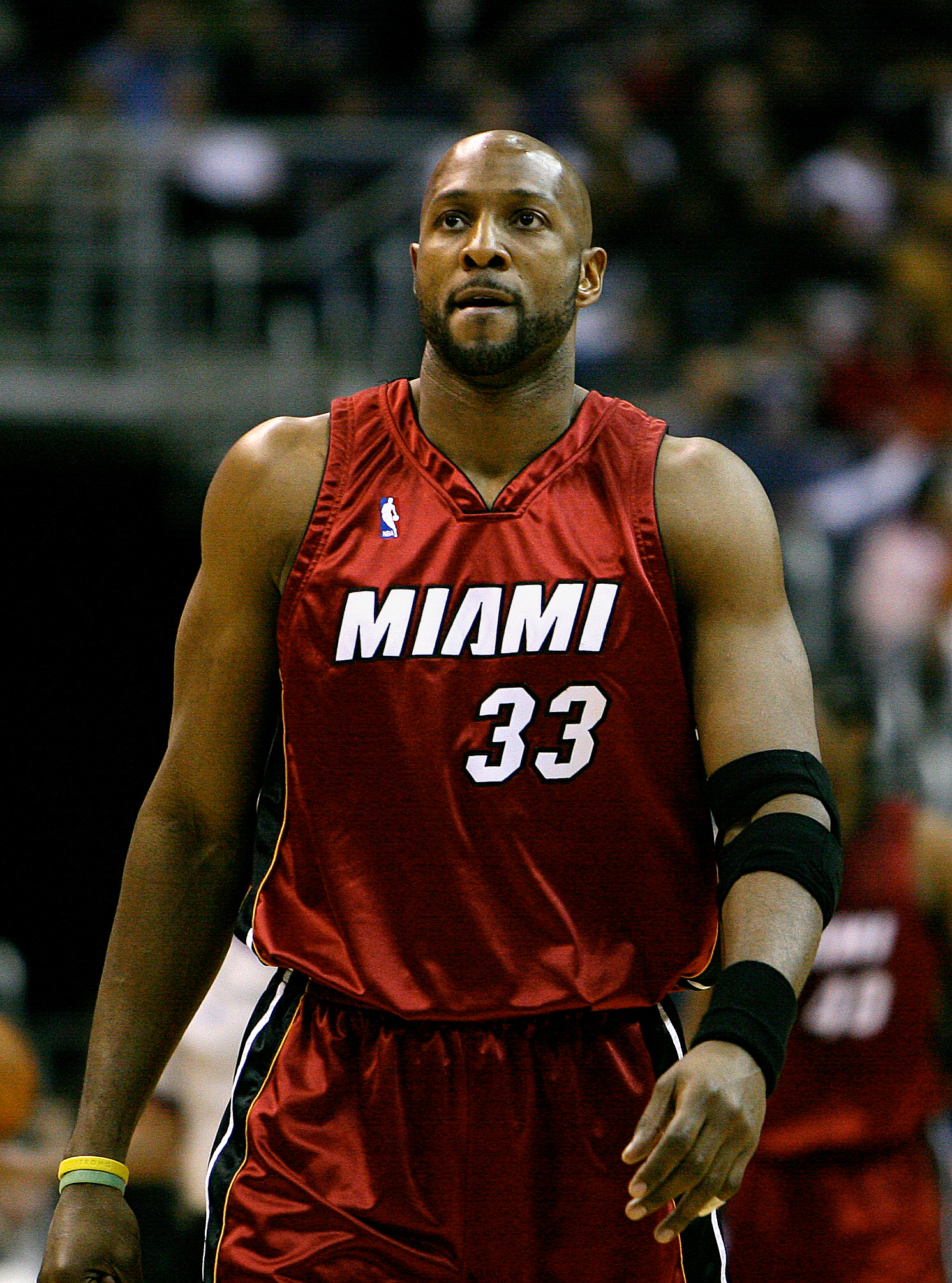
Alonzo Mourning, Georgetown, 1992

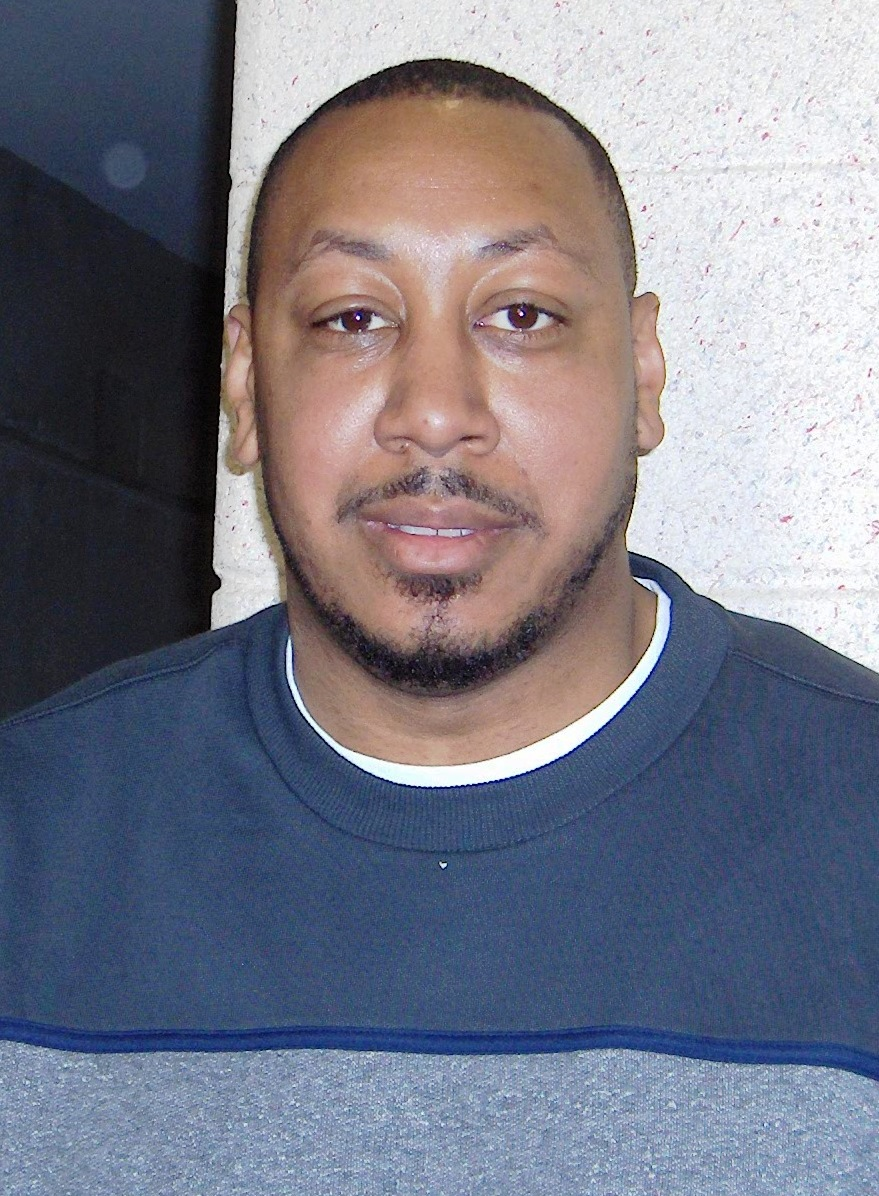
Donyell Marshall, UConn, 1994

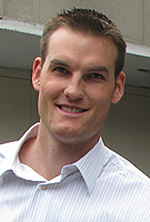
Pat Garrity, Notre Dame, 1997

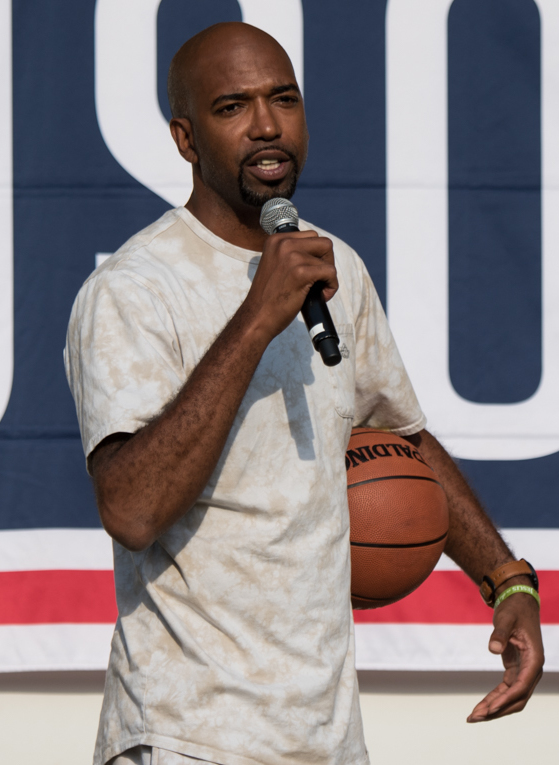
Richard Hamilton, UConn, 1998 and 1999

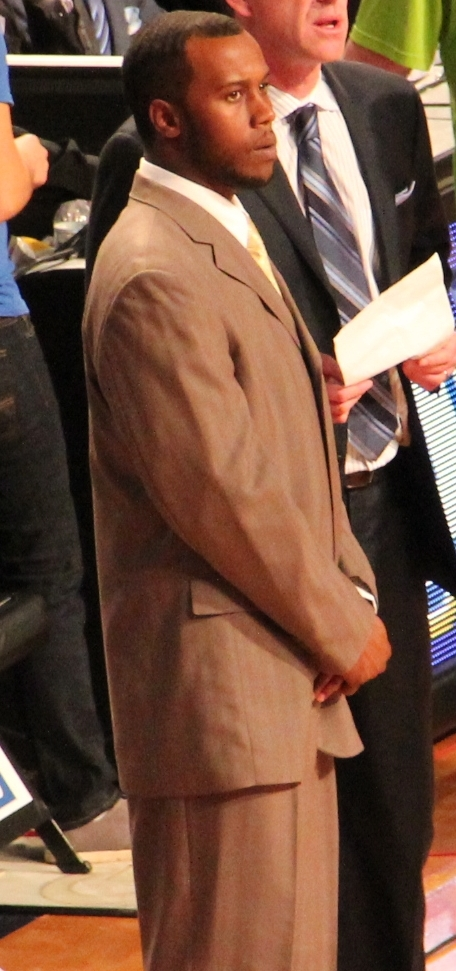
Brandin Knight, Pittsburgh, 2002

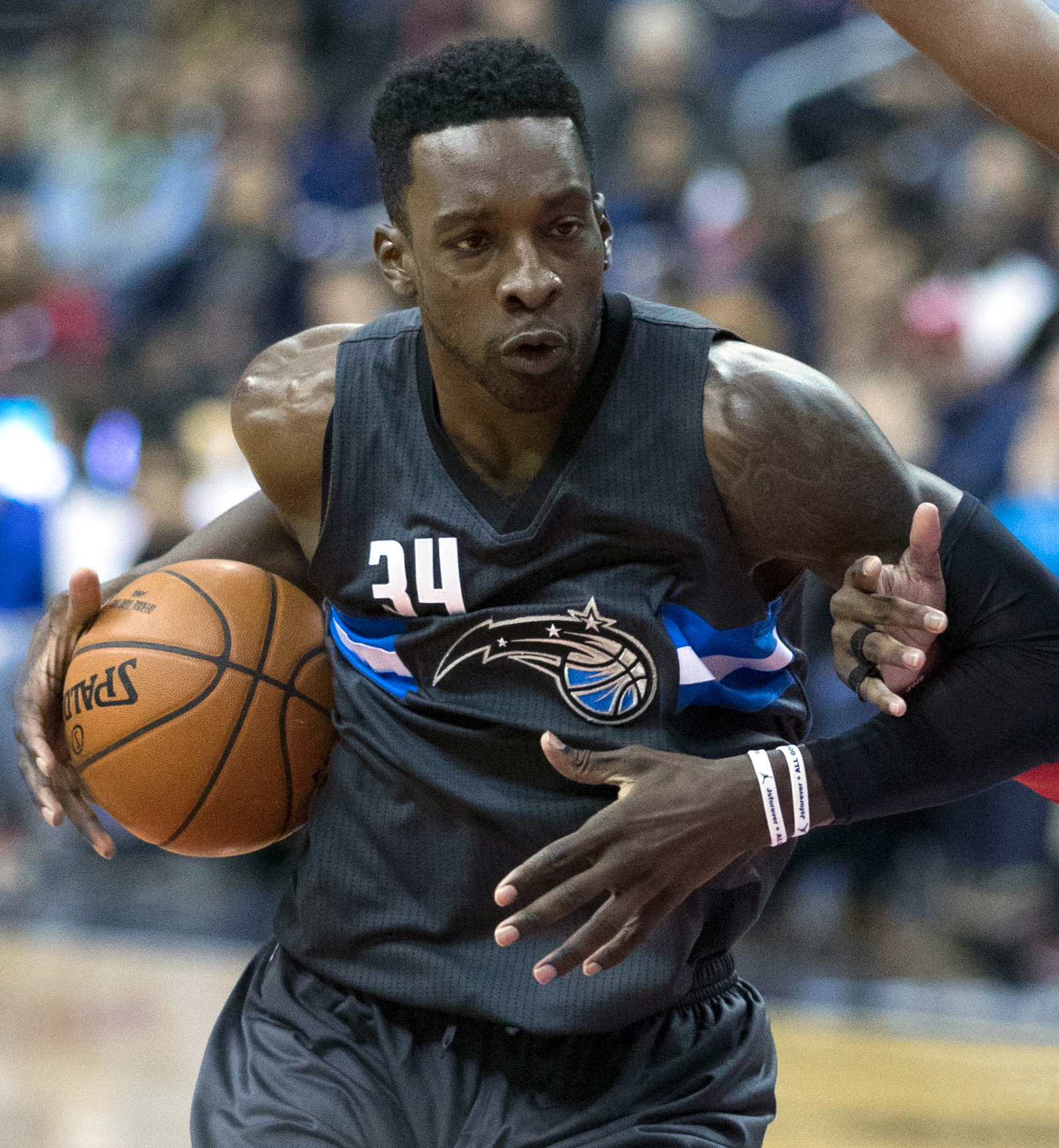
Jeff Green, Georgetown, 2007

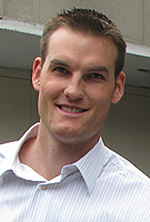
Pat Garrity, Notre Dame, 1997

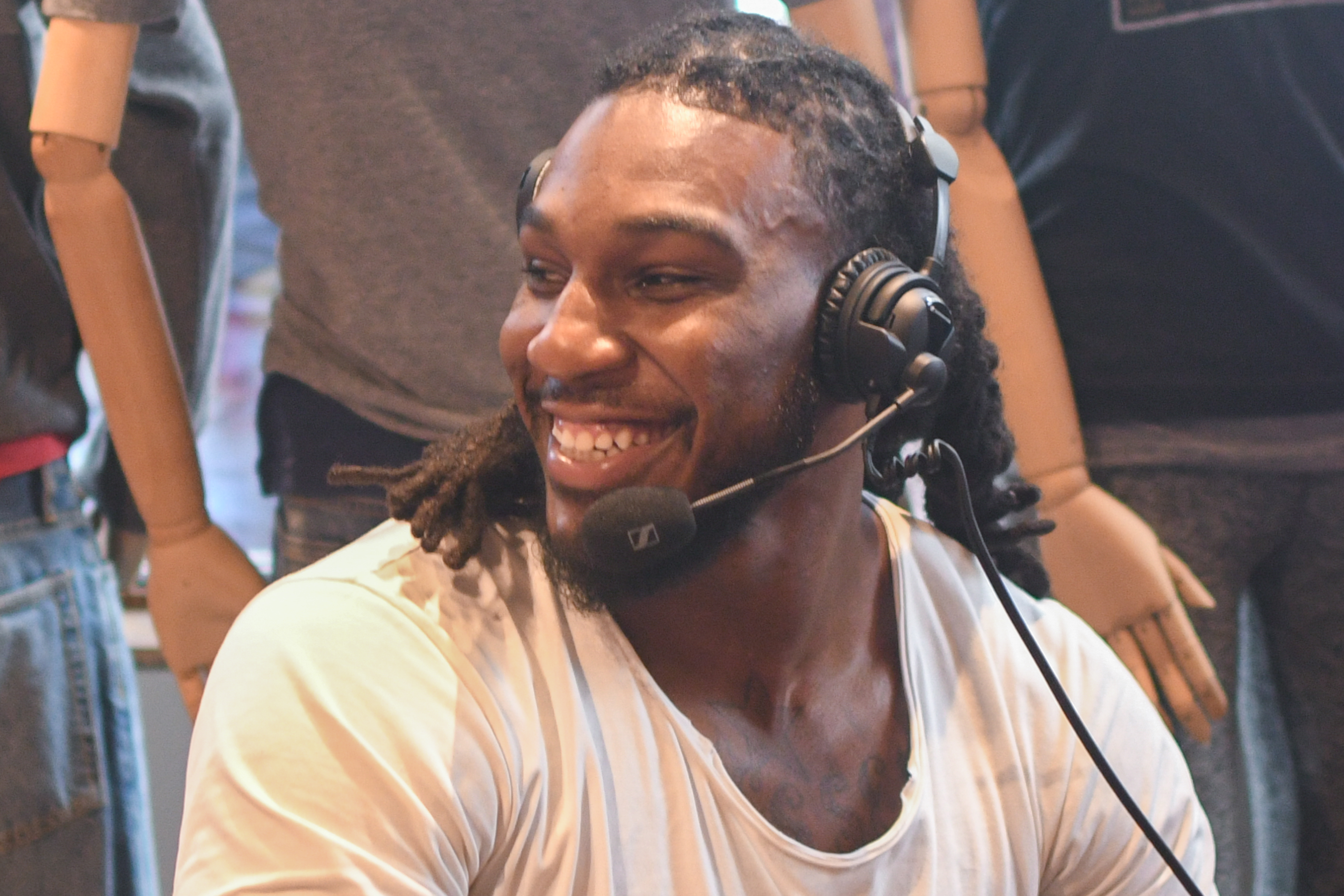
Jae Crowder, Marquette, 2012

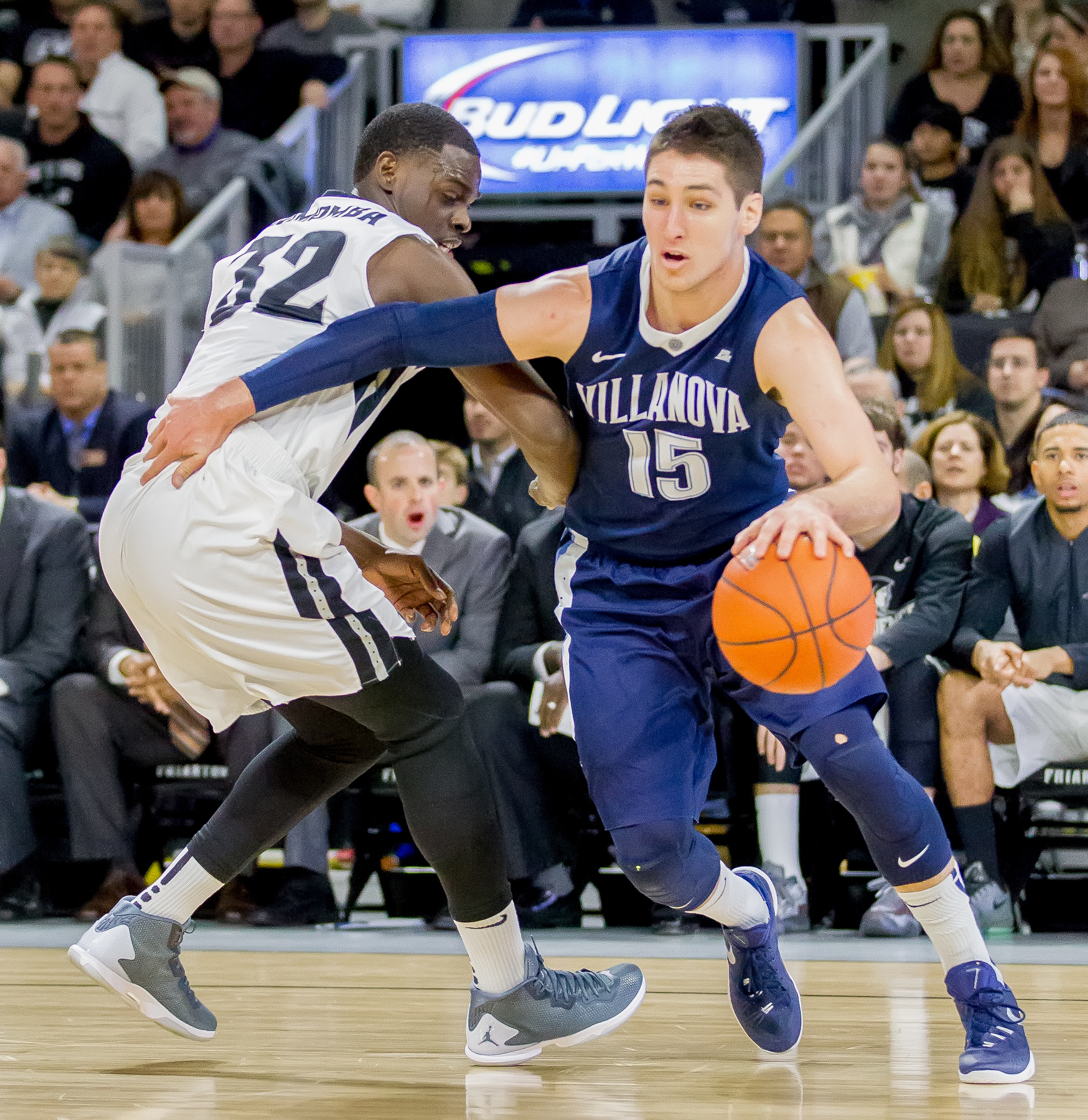
Ryan Arcidiacono, Villanova, 2015

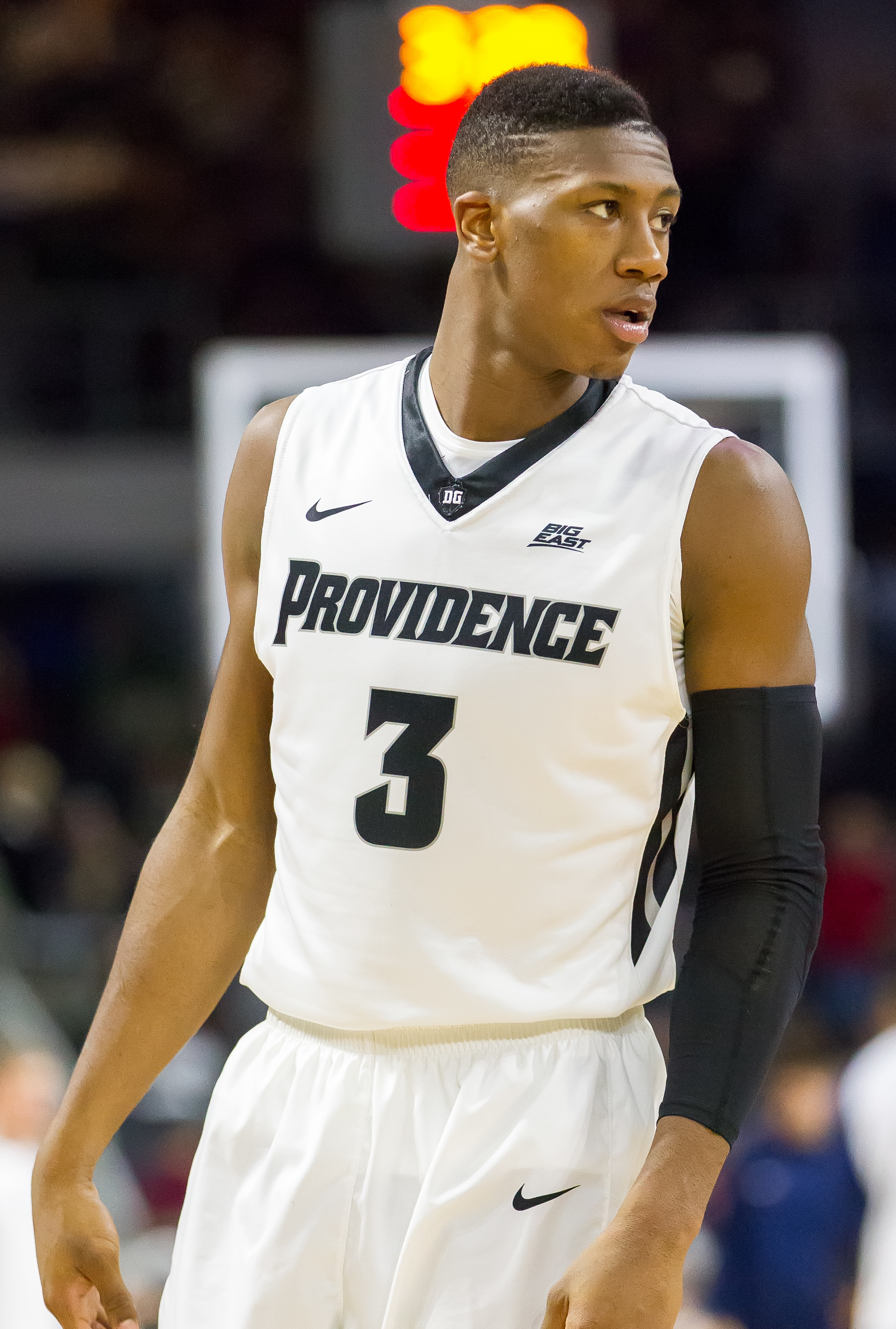
Kris Dunn, Providence, 2015 and 2016

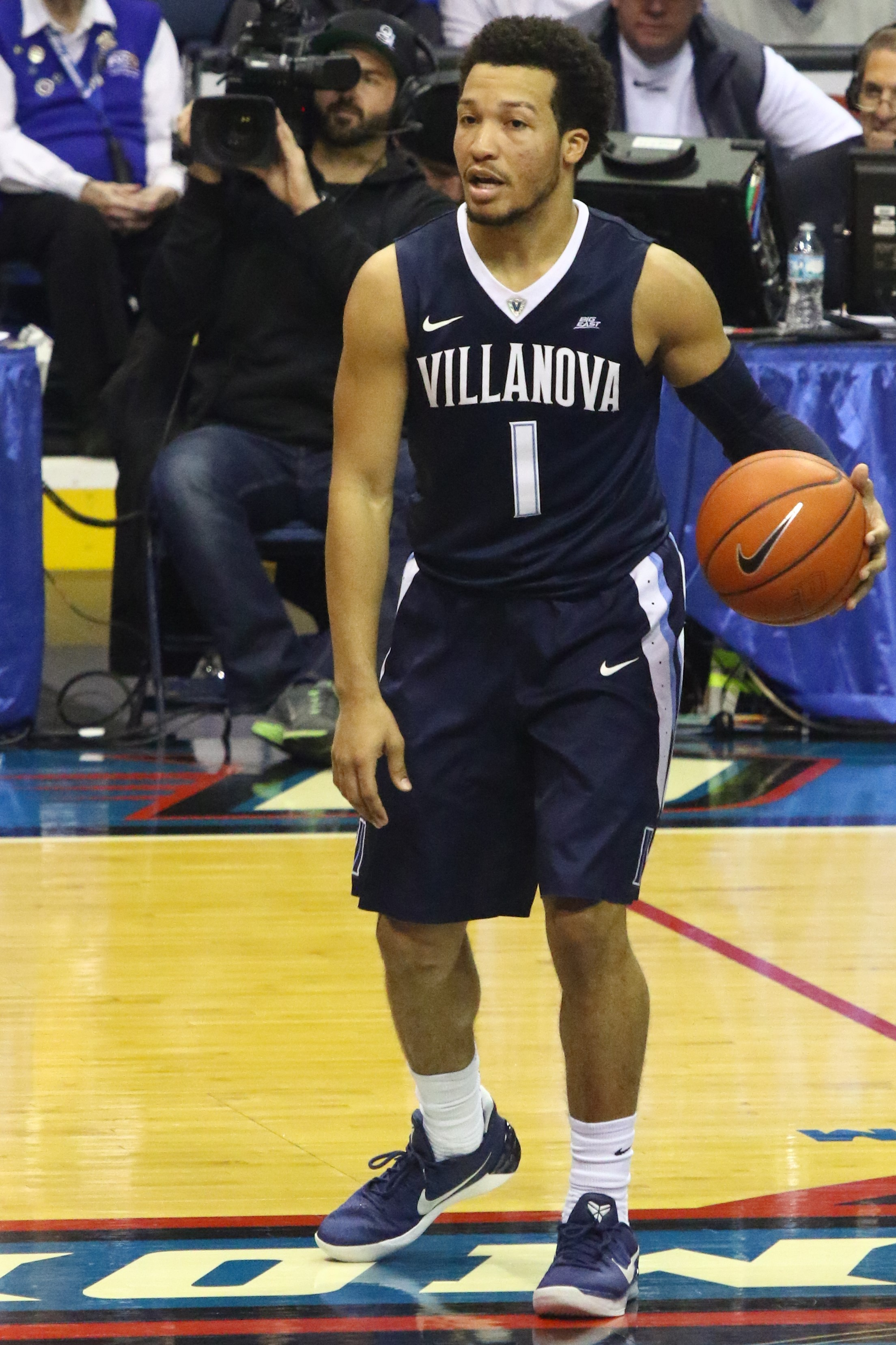
Jalen Brunson, Villanova, 2018

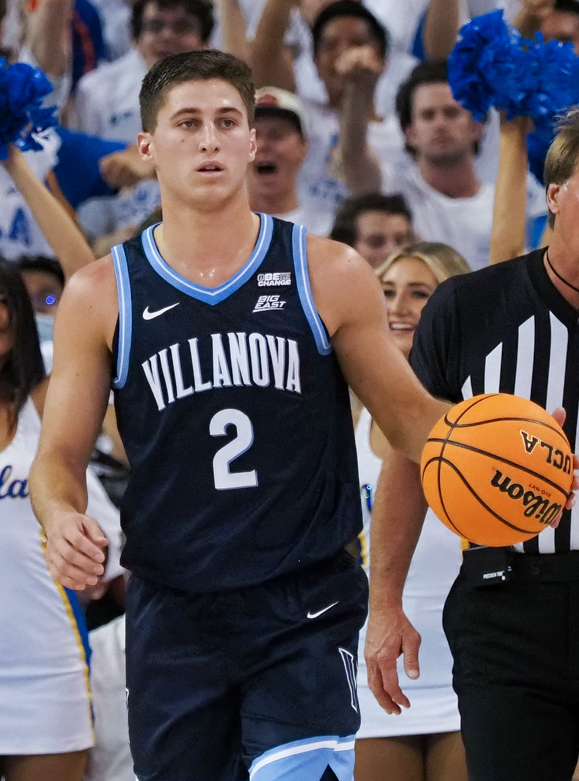
Collin Gillespie, Villanova, 2021 and 2022

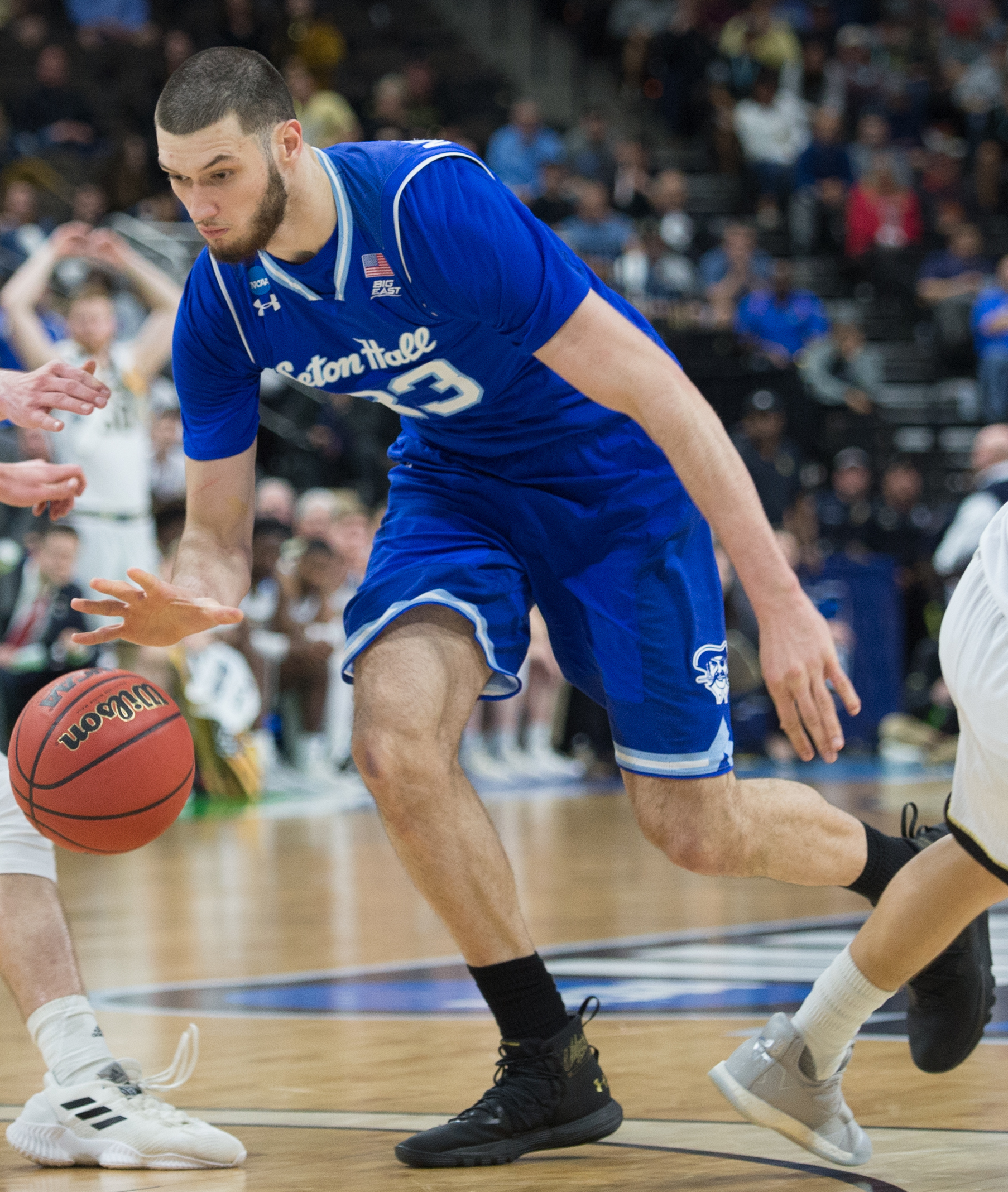
Sandro Mamukelashvili, Seton Hall, 2021

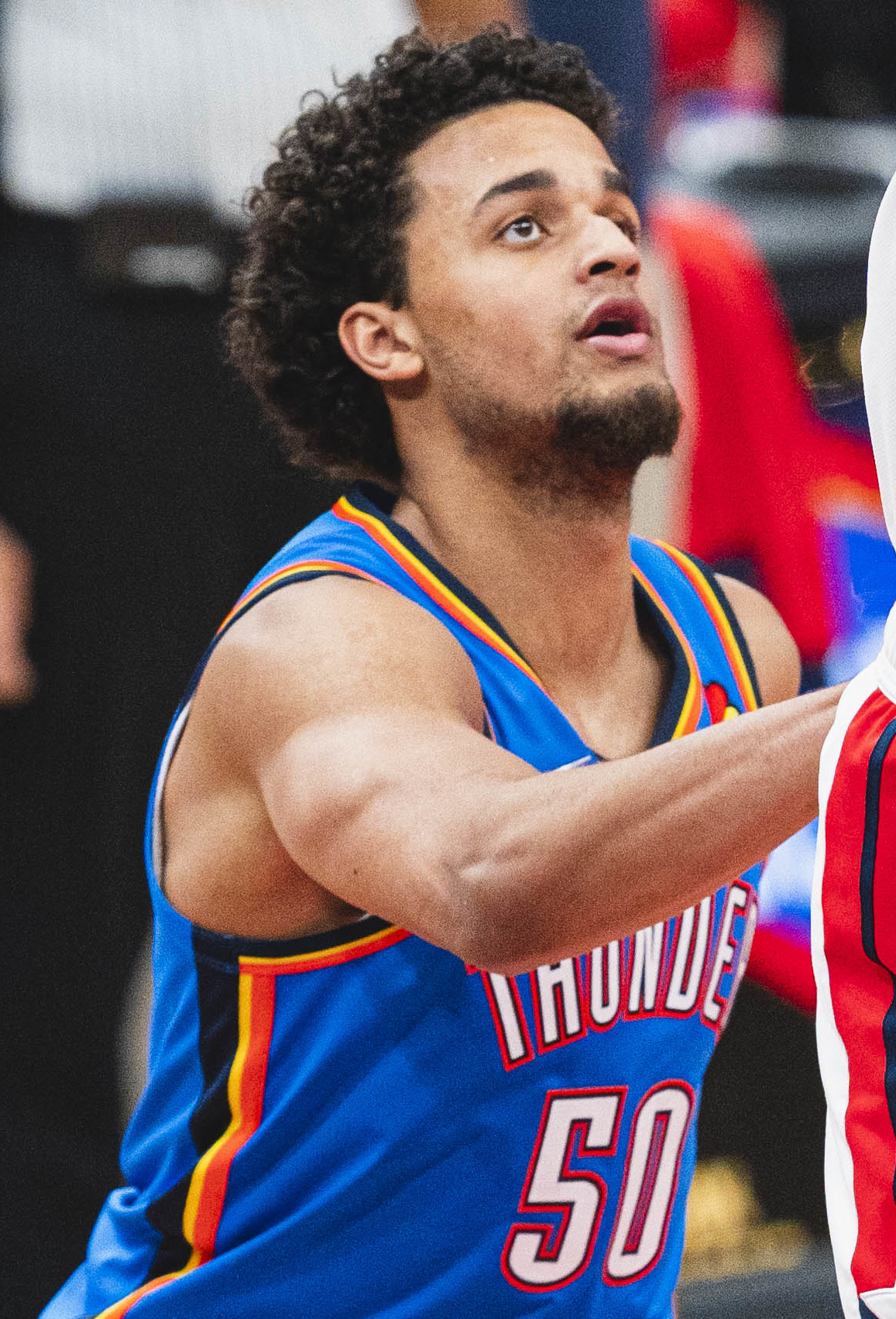
Jeremiah Robinson-Earl, Villanova, 2021

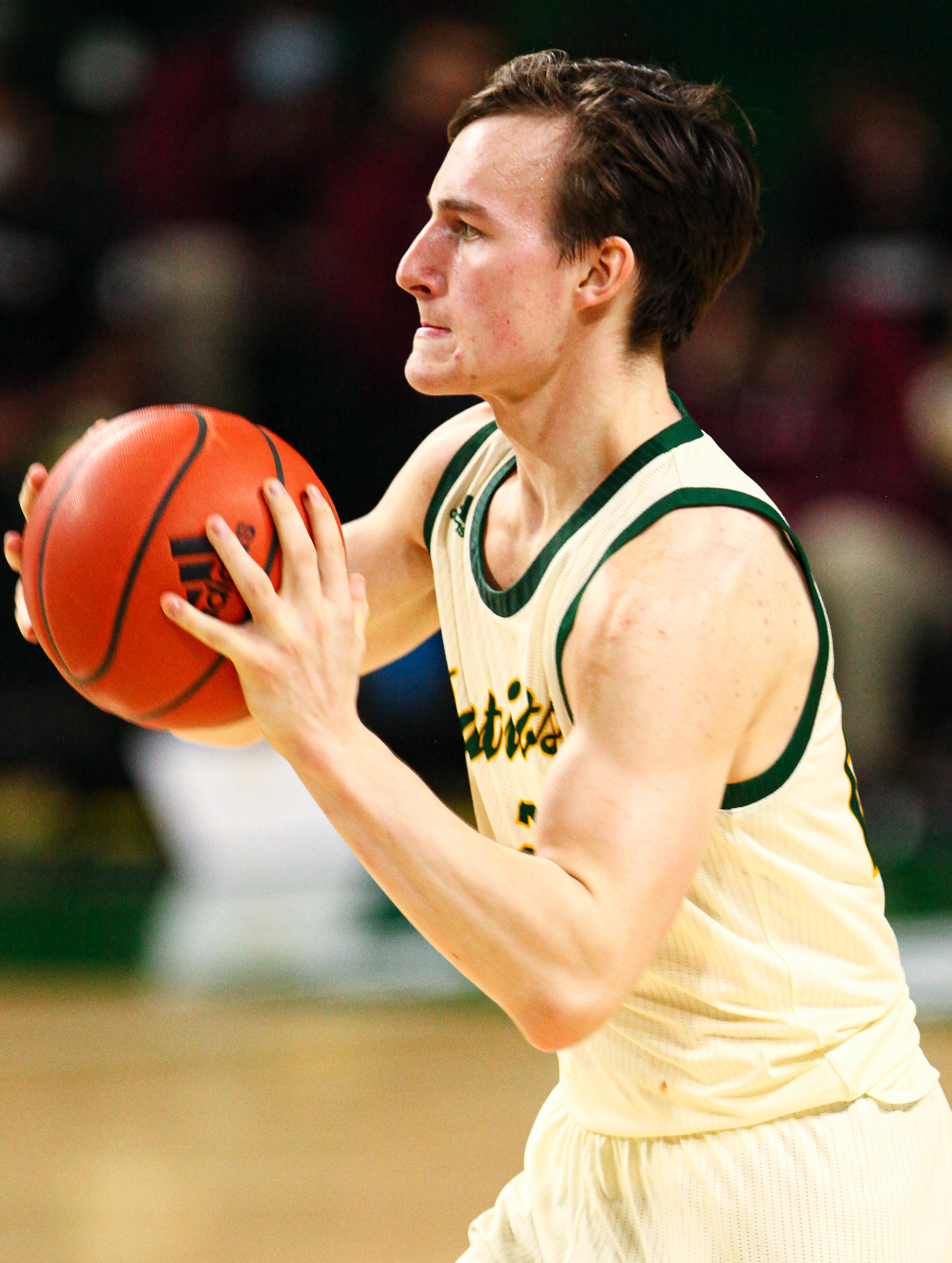
Tyler Kolek, Marquette, 2023

Season	Player	School	Position	Class	Reference
1979–80	John Duren	Georgetown	G	Senior	
1980–81	John Bagley	Boston College	PG	Sophomore	
1981–82	Dan Callandrillo	Seton Hall	SG	Senior	
1982–83	Chris Mullin	St. John's	SF	Sophomore	
1983–84^{†}	Patrick Ewing	Georgetown	C	Junior	
1983–84^{†}	Chris Mullin (2)	St. John's	SF	Junior	
1984–85^{†}	Patrick Ewing* (2)	Georgetown	C	Senior	
1984–85^{†}	Chris Mullin* (3)	St. John's	SF	Senior	
1985–86	Walter Berry*	St. John's	PF	Senior	
1986–87	Reggie Williams	Georgetown	SF	Senior	
1987–88	Charles D. Smith	Pittsburgh	PF	Senior	
1988–89	Charles E. Smith	Georgetown	G	Senior	
1989–90	Derrick Coleman	Syracuse	PF	Senior	
1990–91	Billy Owens	Syracuse	SF / SG	Junior	
1991–92	Alonzo Mourning	Georgetown	C	Senior	
1992–93	Terry Dehere	Seton Hall	SG	Senior	
1993–94	Donyell Marshall	UConn	F	Junior	
1994–95	Kerry Kittles	Villanova	SG	Senior	
1995–96	Ray Allen*	UConn	SG	Junior	
1996–97	Pat Garrity	Notre Dame	PF	Junior	
1997–98	Richard Hamilton	UConn	SG / SF	Sophomore	
1998–99^{†}	Richard Hamilton (2)	UConn	SG / SF	Junior	
1998–99^{†}	Tim James	Miami	SF	Senior	
1999–00	Troy Murphy	Notre Dame	PF	Sophomore	
2000–01^{†}	Troy Bell	Boston College	G	Sophomore	
2000–01^{†}	Troy Murphy (2)	Notre Dame	PF	Junior	
2001–02^{†}	Caron Butler	UConn	SF	Sophomore	
2001–02^{†}	Brandin Knight	Pittsburgh	PG	Junior	
2002–03	Troy Bell (2)	Boston College	G	Senior	
2003–04	Emeka Okafor*	UConn	C	Junior	
2004–05	Hakim Warrick	Syracuse	PF	Senior	
2005–06	Randy Foye	Villanova	G	Senior	
2006–07	Jeff Green	Georgetown	F	Junior	
2007–08	Luke Harangody	Notre Dame	PF	Sophomore	
2008–09^{†}	DeJuan Blair	Pittsburgh	C	Sophomore	
2008–09^{†}	Hasheem Thabeet	UConn	C	Junior	
2009–10	Wesley Johnson	Syracuse	F	Junior	
2010–11	Ben Hansbrough	Notre Dame	SG	Senior	
2011–12	Jae Crowder	Marquette	PF	Senior	
2012–13	Otto Porter	Georgetown	F	Sophomore	
2013–14	Doug McDermott*	Creighton	F	Senior	
2014–15^{†}	Ryan Arcidiacono	Villanova	PG	Junior	
2014–15^{†}	Kris Dunn	Providence	PG	Sophomore	
2015–16	Kris Dunn (2)	Providence	PG	Junior	
2016–17	Josh Hart	Villanova	SG	Senior	
2017–18	Jalen Brunson*	Villanova	PG	Junior	
2018–19	Markus Howard	Marquette	PG	Junior	
2019–20	Myles Powell	Seton Hall	SG	Senior	
2020–21^{†}	Collin Gillespie	Villanova	PG	Senior	
2020–21^{†}	Sandro Mamukelashvili	Seton Hall	PF	Senior	
2020–21^{†}	Jeremiah Robinson-Earl	Villanova	PF	Sophomore	
2021–22	Collin Gillespie (2)	Villanova	PG	Graduate	
2022–23	Tyler Kolek	Marquette	PG	Junior	
2023–24	Devin Carter	Providence	SG	Junior	
2024–25	RJ Luis Jr.	St. John's	SF	Junior	
2025–26	Zuby Ejiofor	St. John's	PF	Senior	

== Winners by school ==
School (year joined)	Winners	Years
Georgetown (1979)	8	1980, 1984^{†}, 1985^{†}, 1987, 1989, 1992, 2007, 2013
Villanova (1980)	8	1995, 2006, 2015^{†}, 2017, 2018, 2021 (×2)^{†}, 2022
UConn (1979/2020) (Note: Following the split of the original Big East in 2013, Cincinnati, Louisville, Rutgers, South Florida, and UConn remained in the football-sponsoring portion now known as the American Conference.) (Note: UConn joined the current Big East in 2020.)	7	1994, 1996, 1998, 1999^{†}, 2002^{†}, 2004, 2009^{†}
St. John's (1979)	6	1983, 1984^{†}, 1985^{†}, 1986, 2025, 2026
Notre Dame (1995) (Note: Notre Dame, Pittsburgh, and Syracuse left for the ACC in 2013.)	5	1997, 2000, 2001^{†}, 2008, 2011
Seton Hall (1979)	4	1982, 1993, 2020, 2021^{†}
Syracuse (1979)	4	1990, 1991, 2005, 2010
Boston College (1979) (Note: Boston College was a founding member in 1979, and left the Big East for the ACC in 2005.)	3	1981, 2001^{†}, 2003
Marquette (2005)	3	2012, 2019, 2023
Pittsburgh (1982) (Note: Notre Dame, Pittsburgh, and Syracuse left for the ACC in 2013.)	3	1988, 2002^{†}, 2009^{†}
Providence (1979)	3	2015^{†}, 2016, 2024
Creighton (2013)	1	2014
Miami (1991) (Note: Miami joined the conference in 1991 and left for the ACC in 2004.)	1	1999^{†}
Butler (2013)	0	—
Cincinnati (2005)	0	—
DePaul (2005)	0	—
Louisville (2005)	0	—
Rutgers (1995)	0	—
South Florida (2005)	0	—
Virginia Tech (2000) (Note: Virginia Tech became an all-sports member of the Big East in 2000; it had joined for football in 1991. The Hokies left for the ACC in 2004.)	0	—
West Virginia (1995) (Note: West Virginia became an all-sports member of the Big East in 1995; it had also joined for football in 1991. The Mountaineers left for the Big 12 in 2012.)	0	—
Xavier (2013)	0	—

== See also ==
- Big East Conference Men's Basketball Rookie of the Year
- Big East Conference Men's Basketball Defensive Player of the Year
- Big East Conference Men's Basketball Most Improved Player
- List of All-Big East Conference men's basketball teams
