= Robert Churchwell =

American basketball player

Personal information
- Born: February 20, 1972 (age 54) South Bend, Indiana, U.S.
- Listed height: 6 ft 6 in (1.98 m)
- Listed weight: 195 lb (88 kg)

Career information
- High school: Gonzaga (Washington, D.C.)
- College: Georgetown (1990–1994)
- NBA draft: 1994: undrafted
- Playing career: 1994–1998
- Position: Shooting guard
- Number: 21

Career history
- 1994–1996: Chicago Rockers
- 1996: Golden State Warriors
- 1996–1997: La Crosse Bobcats
- 1997: Florida Beachdogs
- 1997–1998: Manchester Giants

Career highlights
- CBA All-Rookie Second Team (1995); Big East All-Freshman team (1991)
- Stats at NBA.com
- Stats at Basketball Reference

Robert Churchwell (born February 20, 1972) is an American former professional basketball player. He played collegiately for the Georgetown University.

A 6-foot-6-inch (198 cm), 195-pound (88 kg) guard/forward, he played 4 games for the National Basketball Association's Golden State Warriors in the 1995–96 season.

On June 14, 1994, Chris Devine of the Chicago-based company Major Broadcasting purchased the Wichita Falls Texans, a Continental Basketball Association (CBA) team in Wichita Falls, Texas. The team was moved to Chicago and renamed the "Rockers". During the 1994 CBA draft the Rockers had the eighth pick out of 16 teams. The Rockers selected Derrick Phelps from the University of North Carolina, Deon Thomas from the University of Illinois, Robert Churchwell from Georgetown University, Shon Tarver from the University of California–Los Angeles, and Kenny Williams from the University of Illinois–Chicago, respectively.[7]

The Rockers made the 1995 CBA playoffs with a 28–28 record. During the first round, Chicago defeated the Quad City Thunder in a five-game series.[18] Chicago faced the Pittsburgh Piranhas in the American Conference Finals. Pittsburgh swept Chicago three games to zero in a best-of five series.

On March 12, 1996, the Chicago Rockers announced they were moving to La Crosse, Wisconsin after the 1995–96 season. The team reached an agreement to play at the La Crosse Center, paying one year's rent in advance. They would later become known as the La Crosse Bobcats.

In 1997 he signed for Manchester Giants of the British Basketball League.

He was a Disciplinary Director at Gonzaga College High School from 2021 to 2024.
