= Billy Owens =

American basketball player (born 1969)

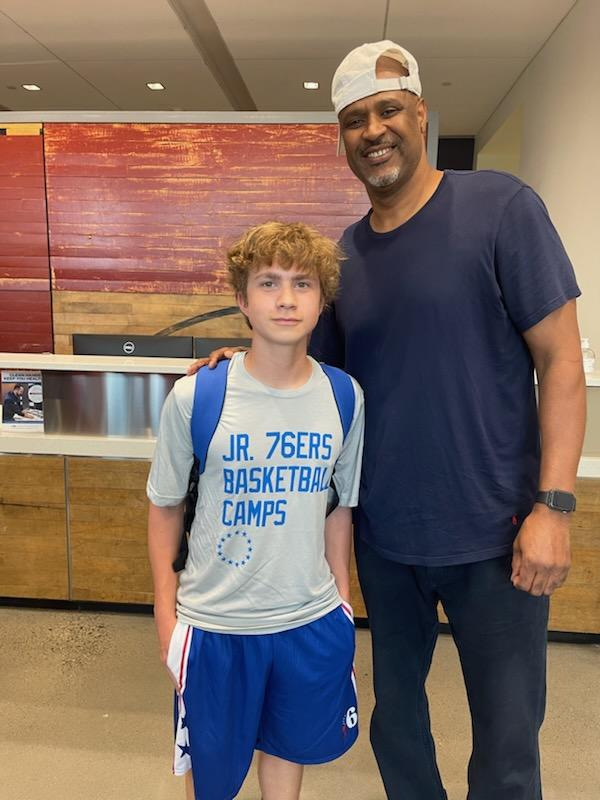
- Owens (right) with a young fan at 2024 Jr. 76ers Basketball Camp

Personal information
- Born: May 1, 1969 (age 57) Carlisle, Pennsylvania, U.S.
- Listed height: 6 ft 9 in (2.06 m)
- Listed weight: 225 lb (102 kg)

Career information
- High school: Carlisle (Carlisle, Pennsylvania)
- College: Syracuse (1988–1991)
- NBA draft: 1991: 1st round, 3rd overall pick
- Drafted by: Sacramento Kings
- Playing career: 1991–2001
- Position: Small forward / shooting guard
- Number: 30, 32, 5
- Coaching career: 2010–2018

Career history

Playing
- 1991–1994: Golden State Warriors
- 1994–1996: Miami Heat
- 1996–1998: Sacramento Kings
- 1999: Seattle SuperSonics
- 1999–2000: Philadelphia 76ers
- 2000: Golden State Warriors
- 2000–2001: Detroit Pistons

Coaching
- 2010–2018: Rutgers–Camden (assistant)

Career highlights
- NBA All-Rookie First Team (1992); Consensus first-team All-American (1991); Third-team All-American – NABC, UPI (1990); Big East Player of the Year (1991); 2× First-team All-Big East (1990, 1991); No. 30 retired by Syracuse Orange; McDonald's All-American Game Co-MVP (1988); First-team Parade All-American (1988); Third-team Parade All-American (1987)

Career NBA statistics
- Points: 7,026 (11.7 ppg)
- Rebounds: 4,016 (6.7 rpg)
- Assists: 1,704 (2.8 apg)
- Stats at NBA.com
- Stats at Basketball Reference
Medals
Men's basketball
Representing United States
FIBA Americas Championship
| Silver medal – second place | 1989 Mexico City | Team competition |
World Championship
| Bronze medal – third place | 1990 Buenos Aires | Team competition |
Goodwill Games
| Silver medal – second place | 1990 Seattle | Team competition |

Billy Eugene Owens (born May 1, 1969) is an American former professional basketball player who played for several teams in the National Basketball Association (NBA). He played college basketball for Syracuse, where he was an All-American and the 1991 Big East Conference Player of the Year. Born in Carlisle, Pennsylvania, Owens played for Carlisle High School.

== Amateur career ==
As a high school senior, Owens averaged 34 points per game, and helped lead Carlisle High School (Pennsylvania) to four consecutive state titles. He was considered to be the second best prep player of 1988, behind Alonzo Mourning. Owens and Mourning were co-MVPs in the McDonald's' Game. Throughout his career, Owens drew some comparisons to Magic Johnson due to his great versatility, ball handling and passing skills for his height.

In his three seasons with Syracuse he averaged 17.9 points, 8.8 rebounds, 3.7 assists and 2.1 steals per game out of 103 games. In his junior season he was named Big East Player of the Year.

== Professional career ==
As a 6'8" small forward/shooting guard from Syracuse University, he was selected by the Sacramento Kings in the 1991 NBA draft. However, after Owens remained a holdout beyond the start of the regular season, he was traded to the Golden State Warriors in exchange for high-scoring guard Mitch Richmond. The trade broke up the popular "Run TMC" trio of Mitch Richmond, Tim Hardaway, and Chris Mullin; Owens' additional height compared to Richmond was the size that coach and general manager Don Nelson believed would complete the team. Nelson said he "was under pressure to get [the team] bigger" to improve the Warriors from a good team to a great one.

Owens averaged over 15 points and nearly eight rebounds during his tenure with the Warriors, including an NBA All-Rookie First Team selection in 1992. The Warriors improved from 44 to 55 wins in his first season. However, Owens was injured during his second season, and he never reached the level of play the team hoped for.

In 1994, the Warriors traded Owens and the draft rights of Sasha Danilović to the Miami Heat for Rony Seikaly. In 1996, Owens and Kevin Gamble were traded to the Sacramento Kings for Tyrone Corbin and Walt Williams. In 1999, Owens signed with the Seattle SuperSonics, but was traded in the following offseason alongside Dale Ellis, Don MacLean, and the draft rights of Corey Maggette to the Orlando Magic for Horace Grant and draft considerations. Before playing a game for Orlando, Owens was traded to the Philadelphia 76ers for Anthony Parker and Harvey Grant, the brother of Horace Grant. In 2000, Owens was traded back to the Golden State Warriors with Larry Hughes in a three-team deal that sent Toni Kukoč from the Chicago Bulls to the 76ers, but was traded to the Milwaukee Bucks alongside Jason Caffey in a three-team deal before appearing in a game for the Warriors, who acquired Vinny Del Negro and Bob Sura. The Bucks then traded Owens to the Detroit Pistons for Lindsey Hunter before a string of injuries finally took its toll; his career ended in 2001.

== Coaching ==
From 2010 to 2018, Owens served as an assistant coach for the men's basketball team at Division III Rutgers-Camden. In practice, players asked Owens how they should prepare themselves for professional careers. "I don't sugar-coat it because then you're playing with young kids' minds," Owens said. "For them to have their dreams crushed can do serious damage to them when they become real adults."

== National team ==
He played for the US national team in the 1990 FIBA World Championship, winning the bronze medal. In the same year, he also represented the United States at the Goodwill Games in Seattle and led the team in scoring en route to a silver medal.

== NBA player statistics ==
Legend
| GP | Games played | GS | Games started | MPG | Minutes per game |
| FG% | Field goal percentage | 3P% | 3-point field goal percentage | FT% | Free throw percentage |
| RPG | Rebounds per game | APG | Assists per game | SPG | Steals per game |
| BPG | Blocks per game | PPG | Points per game | **Bold** | Career high |

=== Regular season ===
| Year | Team | GP | GS | MPG | FG% | 3P% | FT% | RPG | APG | SPG | BPG | PPG |
|---|---|---|---|---|---|---|---|---|---|---|---|---|
| 1991–92 | Golden State | **80** | 77 | 31.4 | **.525** | .111 | .654 | 8.0 | 2.4 | 1.1 | **0.8** | 14.3 |
| 1992–93 | Golden State | 37 | 37 | 32.5 | .501 | .091 | .639 | 7.1 | 3.9 | 0.9 | **0.8** | **16.5** |
| 1993–94 | Golden State | 79 | 72 | **34.7** | .507 | .200 | .610 | **8.1** | **4.1** | 1.1 | **0.8** | 15.0 |
| 1994–95 | Miami | 70 | 60 | 32.8 | .491 | .091 | .620 | 7.2 | 3.5 | 1.1 | 0.4 | 14.3 |
| 1995–96 | Miami | 40 | 40 | **34.7** | .505 | .000 | .633 | 7.2 | 3.4 | 0.8 | 0.6 | 14.8 |
| 1995–96 | Sacramento | 22 | 11 | 27.0 | .420 | .417 | .643 | 5.7 | 3.2 | 0.9 | 0.7 | 9.9 |
| 1996–97 | Sacramento | 66 | 56 | 30.2 | .467 | .347 | .697 | 5.9 | 2.8 | 0.9 | 0.4 | 11.0 |
| 1997–98 | Sacramento | 78 | **78** | 30.1 | .464 | .371 | .589 | 7.5 | 2.8 | **1.2** | 0.5 | 10.5 |
| 1998–99 | Seattle | 21 | 19 | 21.5 | .394 | **.455** | **.800** | 3.8 | 1.8 | 0.6 | 0.2 | 7.8 |
| 1999–00 | Philadelphia | 46 | 7 | 20.0 | .434 | .333 | .594 | 4.2 | 1.3 | 0.6 | 0.3 | 5.9 |
| 1999–00 | Golden State | 16 | 4 | 24.1 | .380 | .286 | .595 | 6.8 | 2.4 | 0.4 | 0.3 | 6.4 |
| 2000–01 | Detroit | 45 | 14 | 17.6 | .383 | .150 | .475 | 4.6 | 1.2 | 0.7 | 0.3 | 4.4 |
| Career | | 600 | 475 | 29.4 | .481 | .291 | .629 | 6.7 | 2.8 | 0.9 | 0.5 | 11.7 |

=== Playoffs ===
| Year | Team | GP | GS | MPG | FG% | 3P% | FT% | RPG | APG | SPG | BPG | PPG |
|---|---|---|---|---|---|---|---|---|---|---|---|---|
| 1992 | Golden State | **4** | **4** | 39.3 | **.526** | – | .630 | 8.3 | 3.3 | **2.0** | 0.5 | 19.3 |
| 1994 | Golden State | 3 | 3 | **42.3** | .500 | .000 | **.750** | **10.0** | **4.3** | 1.3 | **0.7** | **19.7** |
| 1996 | Sacramento | **4** | **4** | 32.8 | .441 | .000 | .500 | 6.5 | 3.5 | 1.0 | 0.3 | 8.3 |
| Career | | 11 | 11 | 37.7 | .496 | .000 | .644 | 8.1 | 3.6 | 1.5 | 0.5 | 15.4 |
