= Robert Werdann =

American basketball player (born 1970)

Personal information
- Born: September 12, 1970 (age 56) Queens, New York, U.S.
- Listed height: 6 ft 11 in (2.11 m)
- Listed weight: 250 lb (113 kg)

Career information
- High school: Archbishop Molloy (Queens, New York)
- College: St. John's (1988–1992)
- NBA draft: 1992: 2nd round, 46th overall pick
- Drafted by: Denver Nuggets
- Playing career: 1992–2000
- Position: Center
- Number: 28, 41
- Coaching career: 2010–present

Career history

Playing
- 1992–1993: Denver Nuggets
- 1993–1994: Yakima Sun Kings
- 1994: Long Island Surf
- 1994–1995: Harrisburg Hammerheads
- 1995: Long Island Surf
- 1995–1996: New Jersey Nets
- 1996: Oklahoma City Cavalry
- 1996–1997: New Jersey Nets
- 1997: Long Island Surf
- 1997–1999: Yakima Sun Kings
- 1999–2000: Baltimore Bayrunners

Coaching
- 2010–2011: Golden State Warriors (assistant)
- 2011–2013: Charlotte Bobcats (assistant)
- 2013–2014: Idaho Stampede (assistant)
- 2017–2018: Grand Rapids Drive

Career highlights
- Third-team All-Big East (1991); McDonald's All-American (1988); Second-team Parade All-American (1988)
- Stats at NBA.com
- Stats at Basketball Reference

Robert Werdann (born September 12, 1970) is an American former professional basketball player and coach.

Born in Sunnyside, Queens, New York, he attended Archbishop Molloy High School in Queens, New York, graduating in 1988. In his senior year of high school, he was a McDonald's High School All-American. During his college playing career at St. John's University, he became the all-time leader in career blocked shots. He was also a part of the team that won the NIT Championship in 1989, the Big East Championship in 1992, and reached the NCAA tournament three times. In his junior year, he won All-Big East Honors. While playing for St. John's, Werdann was third-team All-Big East as a junior.

He was selected by the Denver Nuggets in the second round (46th overall) of the 1992 NBA draft. A 6'11" center from St. John's University, Werdann played in three NBA seasons. He played for the Nuggets and New Jersey Nets. He also played with the Harrisburg Hammerheads of the CBA. In his NBA career, Werdann played in 47 games and scored a total of 101 points.

He later became an assistant coach with the New Orleans Hornets after earlier working for the team as a player scout for five years.

The Golden State Warriors named Robert Werdann an assistant coach for the 2010–11 season for head coach Keith Smart, along with Jerry Sichting, Calbert Cheaney, and Mark Price. In 2011, he became an assistant coach with the Charlotte Bobcats. In 2013, he was coaching in Puerto Rico. In October 2013, he was hired by the Idaho Stampede as an assistant coach for the 2013–14 season. In 2014, Robert became the professional scout for the Detroit Pistons. In 2017, he was named the head coach of the Pistons' NBA G League affiliate, the Grand Rapids Drive.
