= The Sporting News Men's College Basketball Coach of the Year Award =

American college basketball coach award

The Sporting News College Basketball Coach of the Year
- Awarded for: the most outstanding NCAA Division I men's basketball head coach
- Country: United States
- Presented by: The Sporting News

History
- First award: 1964
- Most recent: Tommy Lloyd, Arizona

The Sporting News Men's College Basketball Coach of the Year Award, often informally called The Sporting News Coach of the Year Award, is an annual basketball award given to the best men's college basketball head coach in NCAA Division I competition. The award was first given in 1964 following the 1963–64 season and is presented by The Sporting News, a United States–based sports magazine that was established in 1886.

Seven coaches have been honored multiple times. John Wooden is the only one to receive the award four times. Bill Self has the second-most with three awards. The two-time awardees include John Calipari, Denny Crum, Rick Pitino, Adolph Rupp, and Tubby Smith.

Two people won the award as interim head coaches: Jim Crews of Saint Louis (2013), who took over for then-head coach Rick Majerus before the 2012–13 season due to Majerus stepping down for health-related reasons, and Rodney Terry of Texas (2023), who took over for then-head coach Chris Beard after eight games of the 2022–23 season due to an indefinite suspension and later firing.

== Key ==
Coach (X)	Denotes the number of times the coach has been awarded The Sporting News Coach of the Year Award at that point
†	Co-Coaches of the Year
W, L, W %	Total wins, total losses, win percentage
Finish	National postseason tournament result
C	Denotes national championship season

== Winners ==
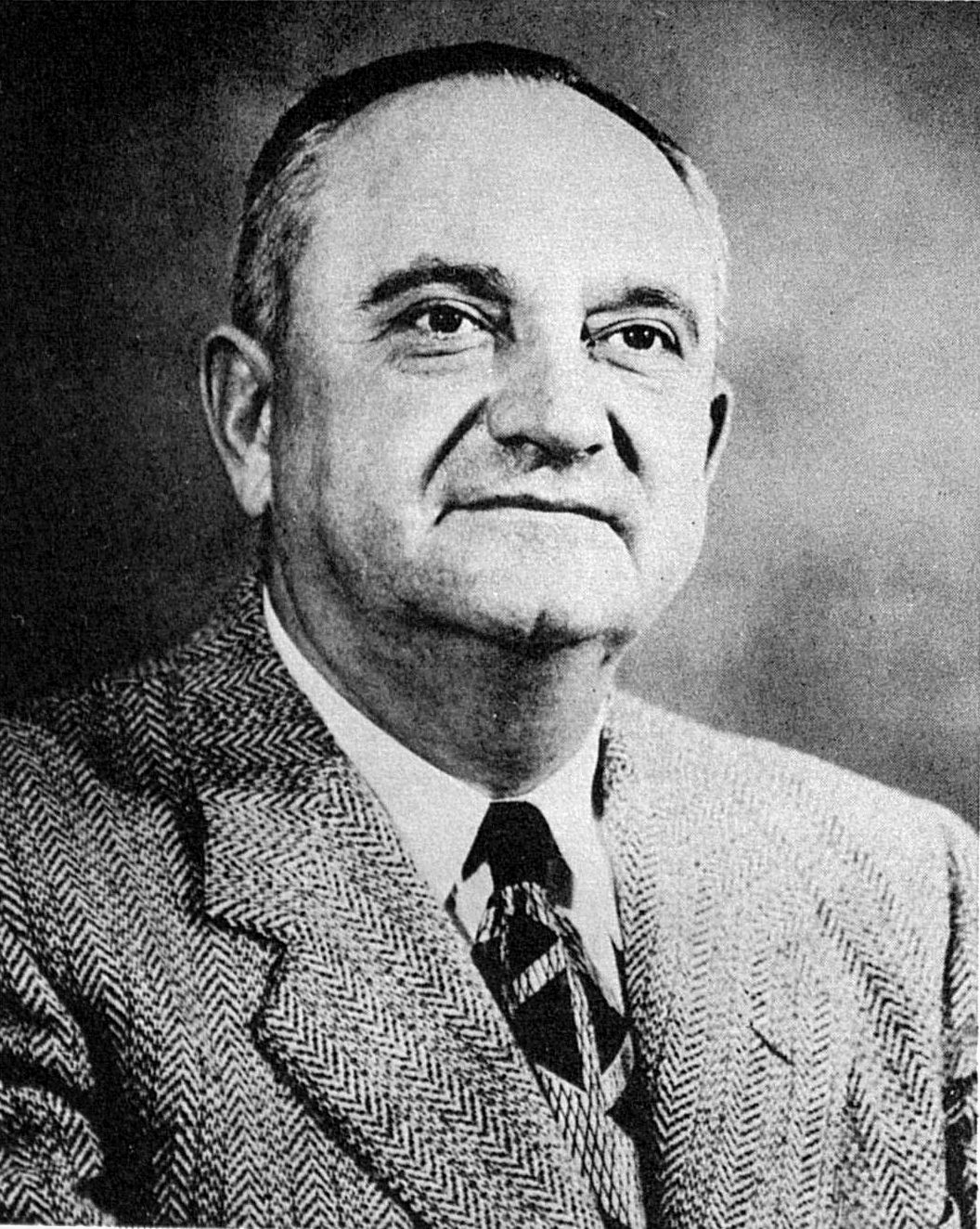
Adolph Rupp, Kentucky, 1966

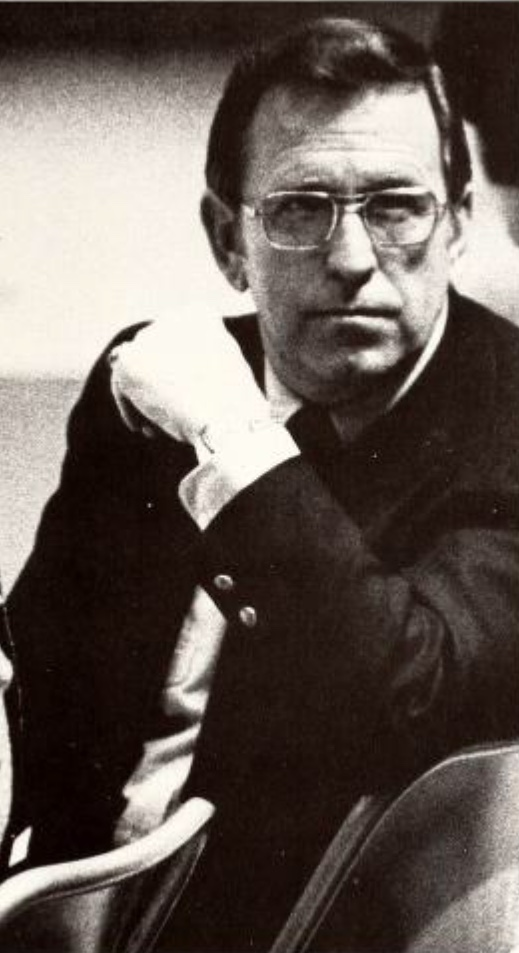
Jack Hartman, Southern Illinois, 1967

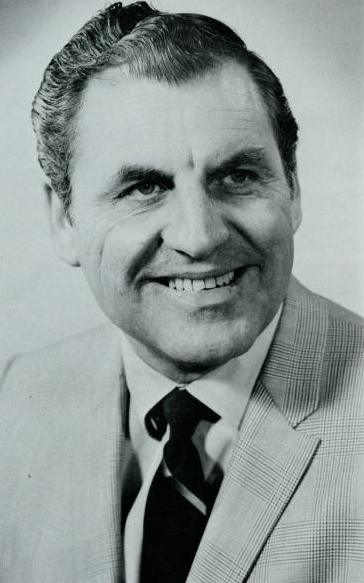
Guy Lewis, Houston, 1968

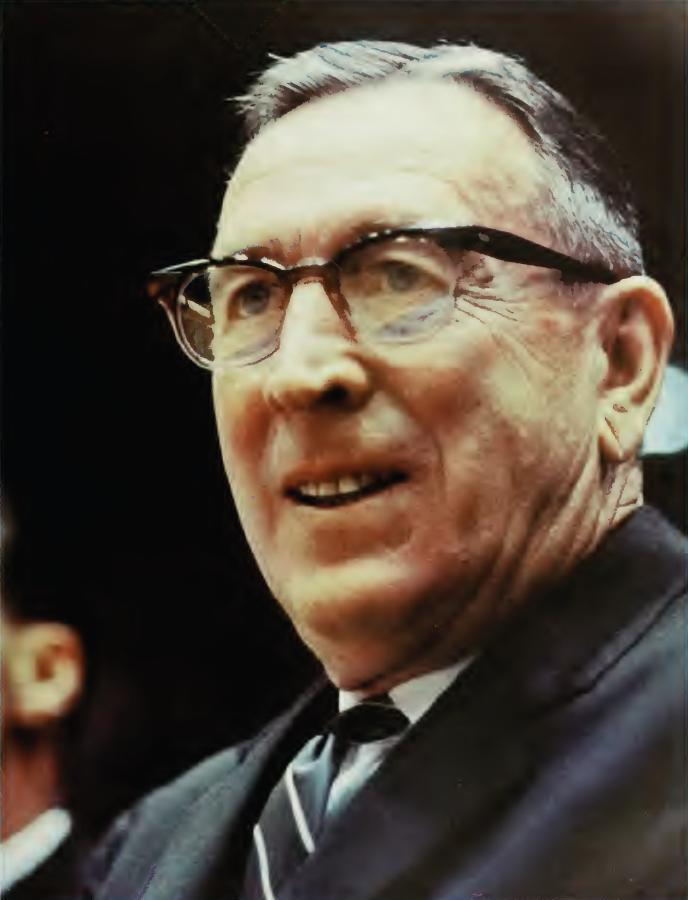
John Wooden, UCLA, 4× winner

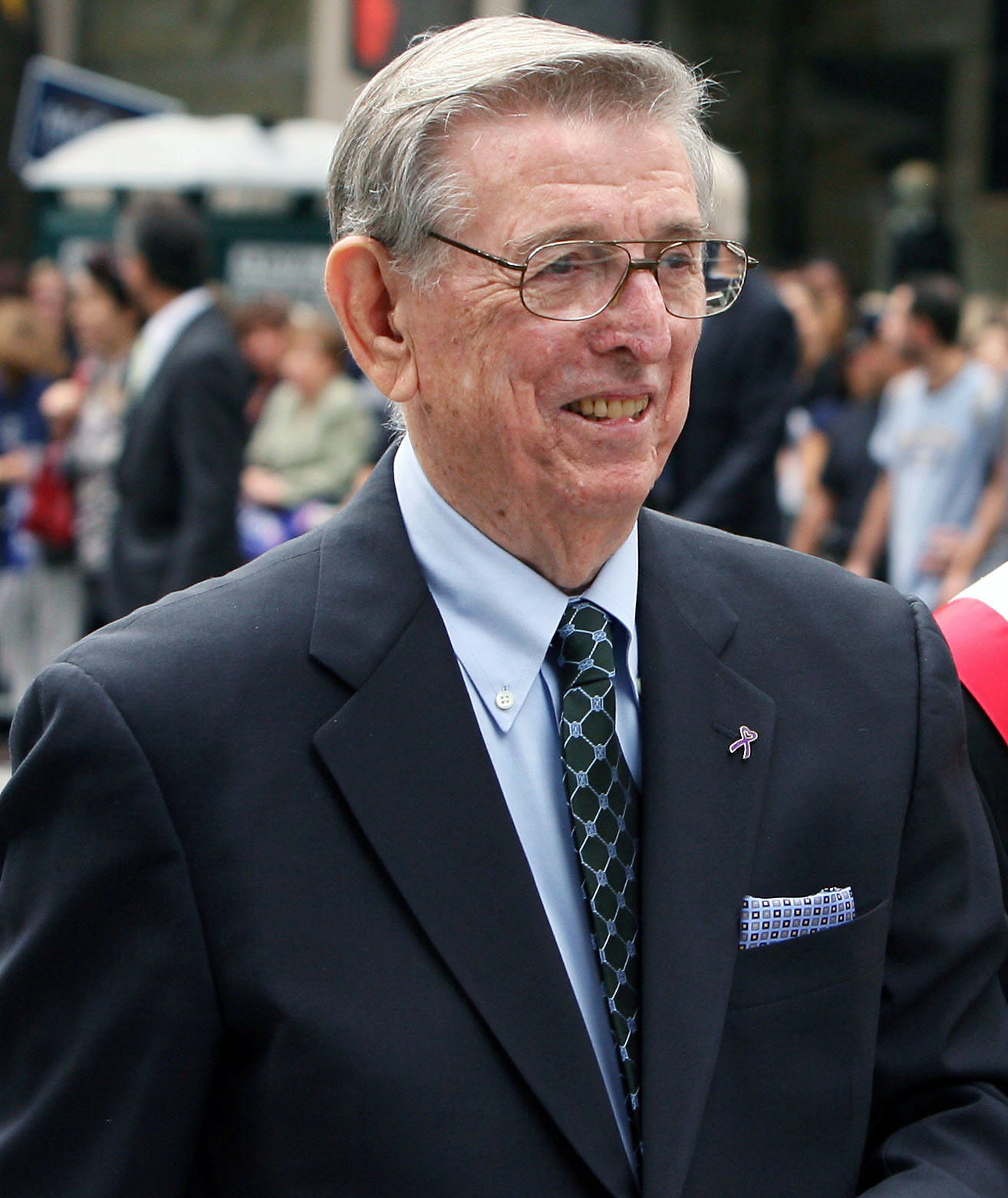
Lou Carnesecca, St. John's, 1985

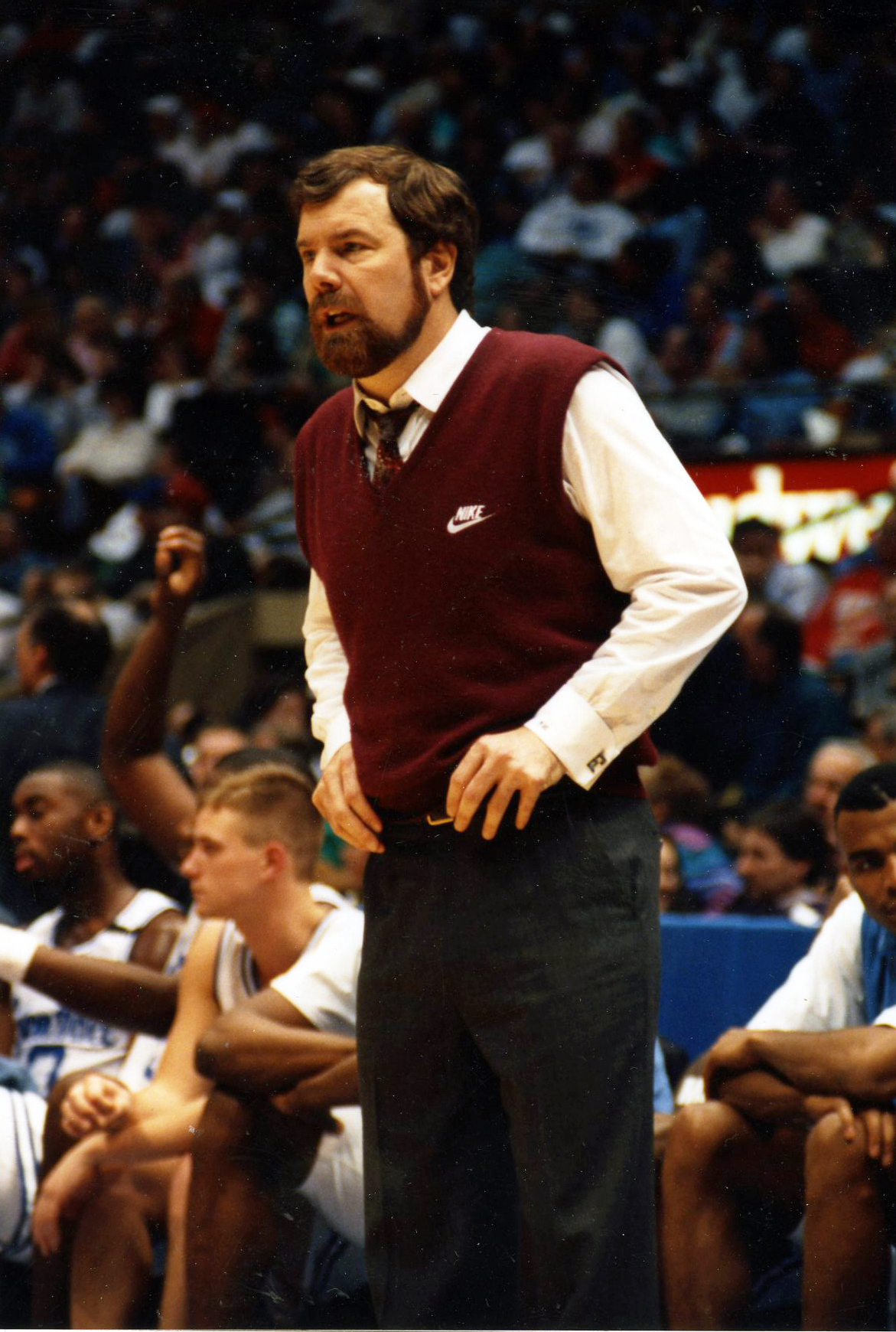
P. J. Carlesimo, Seton Hall, 1989

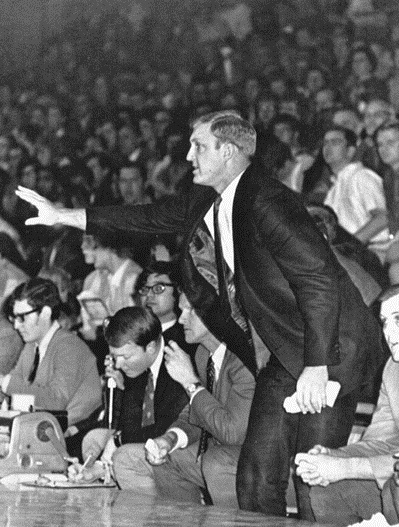
Norm Stewart, Missouri, 1994

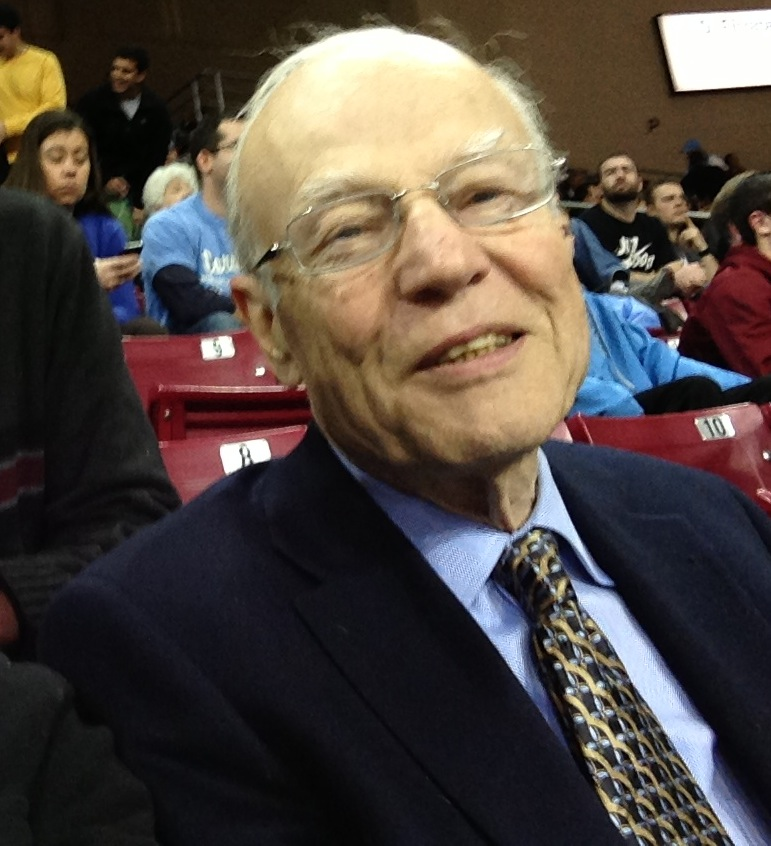
Bill Guthridge, North Carolina, 1998

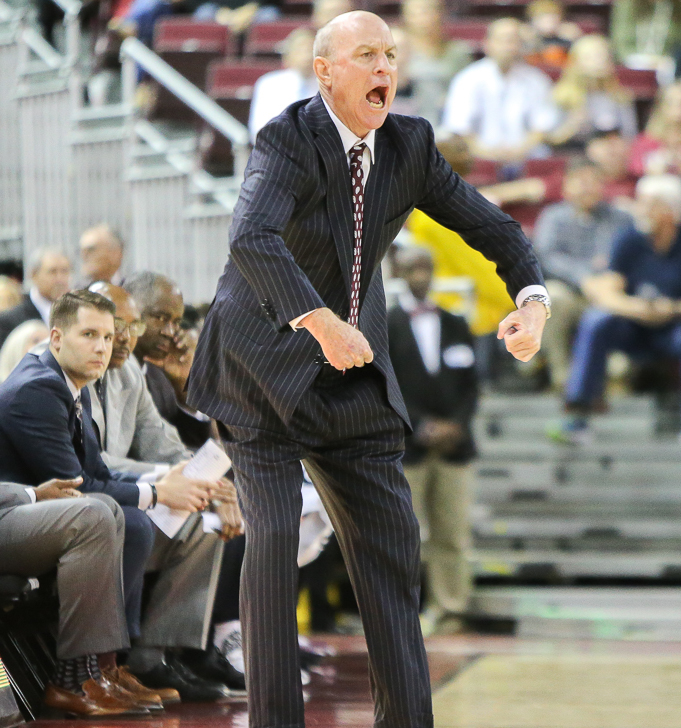
Ben Howland, Pittsburgh, 2002

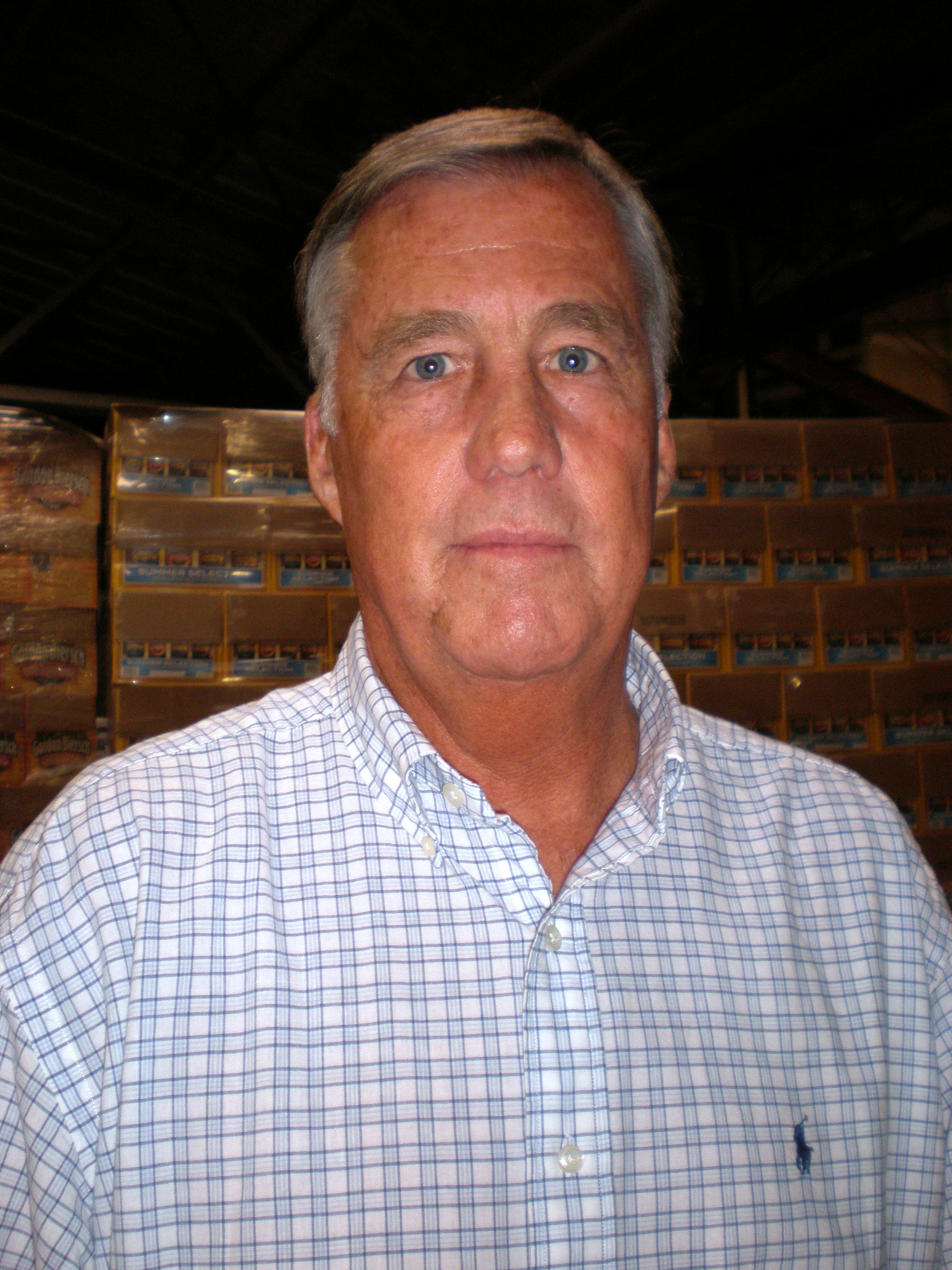
Mike Montgomery, Stanford, 2004

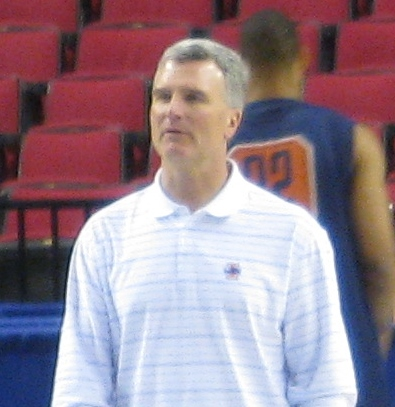
Bruce Weber, Illinois, 2005

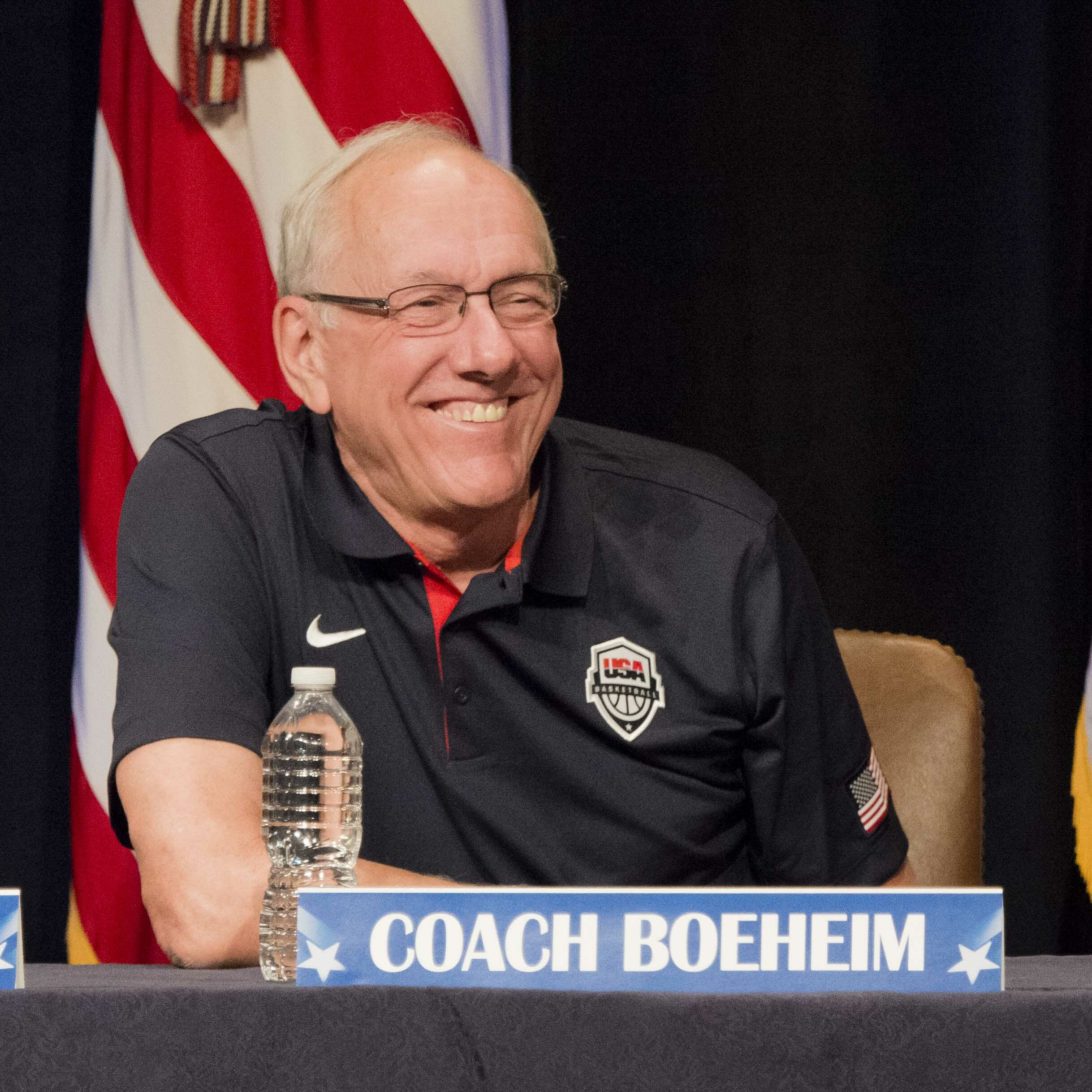
Jim Boeheim, Syracuse, 2010

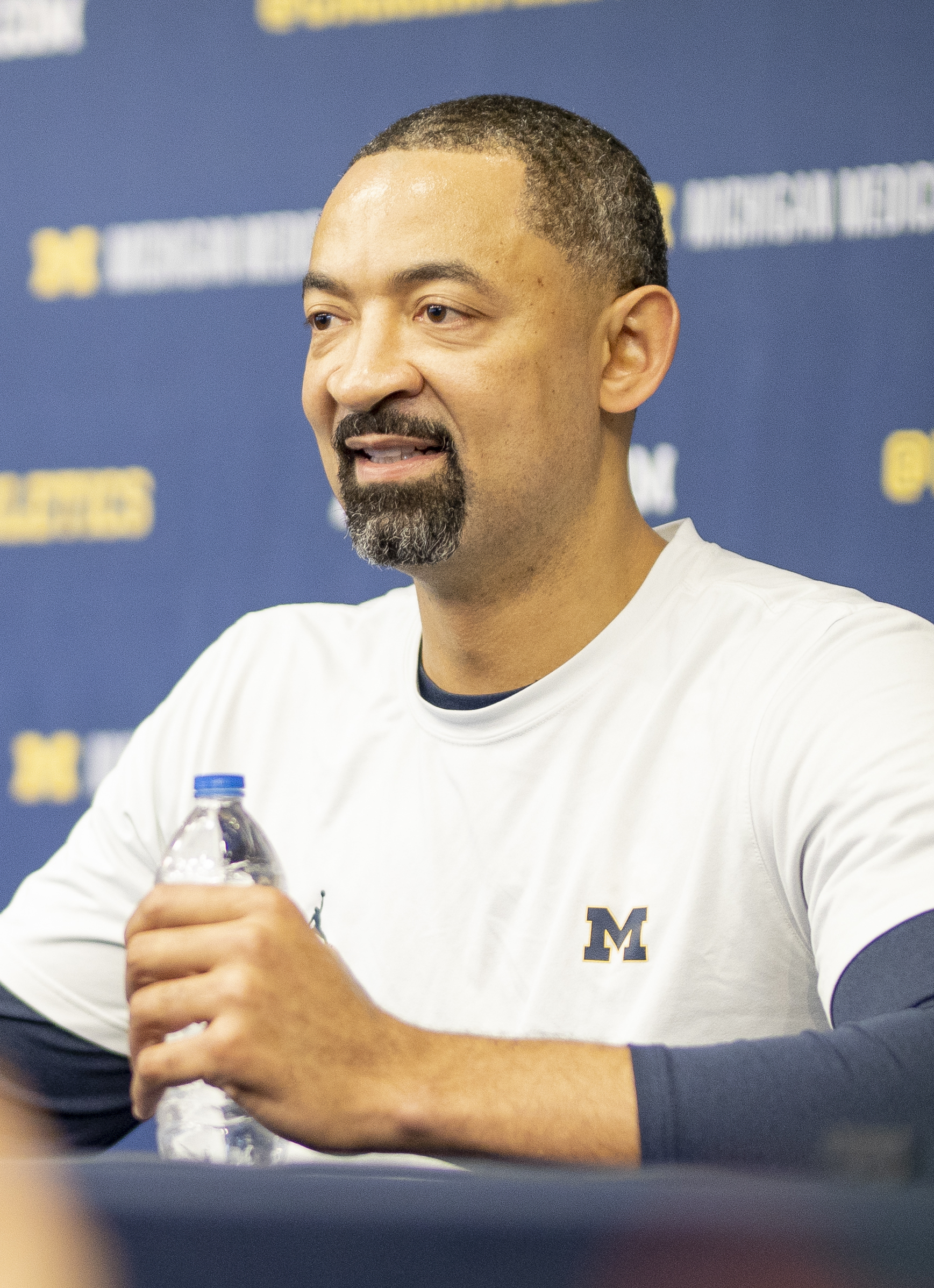
Juwan Howard, Michigan, 2021

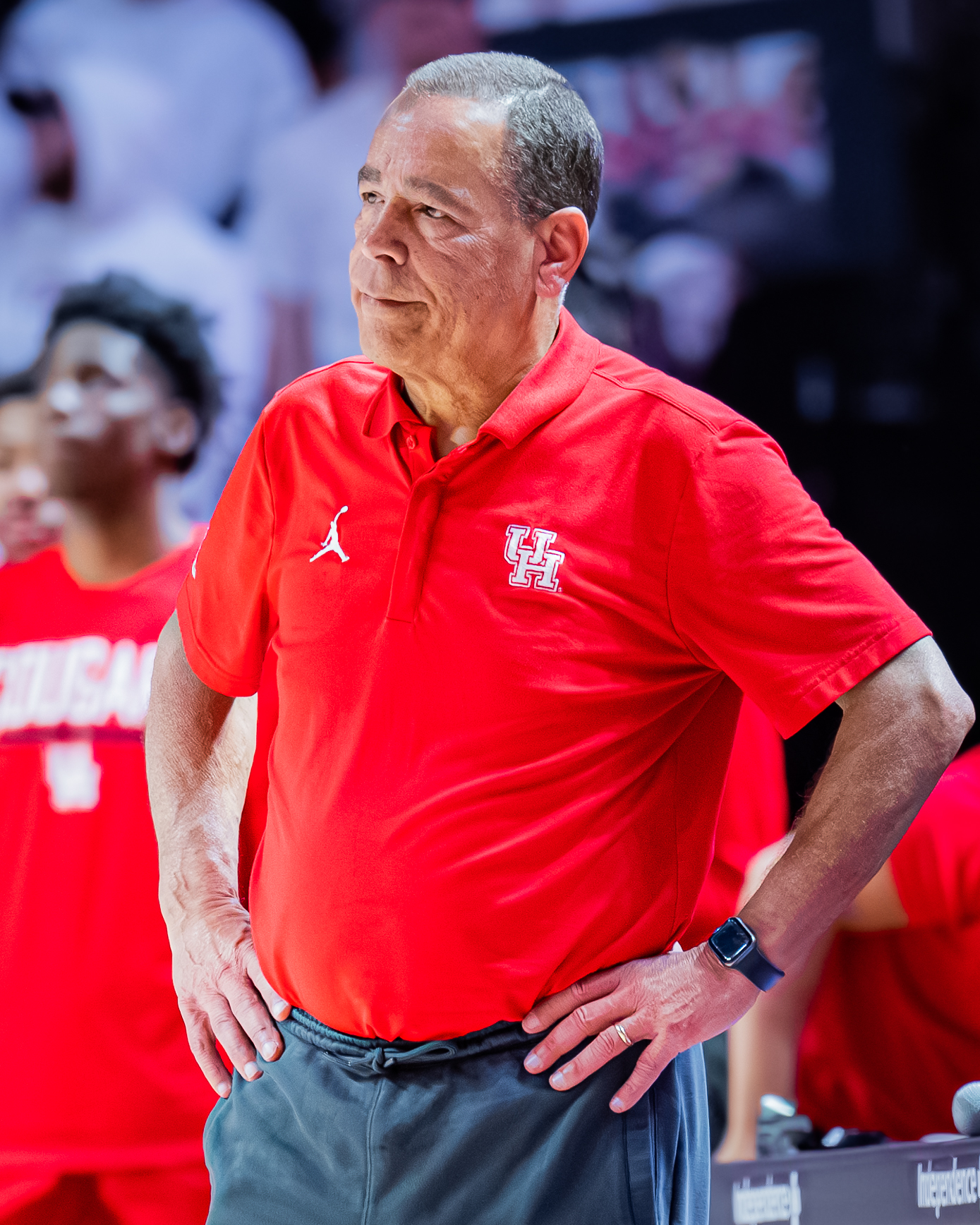
Kelvin Sampson, Houston, 2025

Season	Coach	School	W	L	W %	Finish	Reference
1963–64	John Wooden	UCLA	30	0	1.000	NCAA champion^{C}	
1964–65	No award						
1965–66	Adolph Rupp	Kentucky	27	2	.931	NCAA runners-up	
1966–67	Jack Hartman	Southern Illinois	24	2	.923	NIT champion	
1967–68	Guy Lewis	Houston	31	2	.939	NCAA Final Four	
1968–69	John Wooden (2)	UCLA	29	1	.967	NCAA champion^{C}	
1969–70	Adolph Rupp (2)	Kentucky	26	2	.929	NCAA Elite Eight	
1970–71	Al McGuire	Marquette	28	1	.966	NCAA Regional Third Place	
1971–72	John Wooden (3)	UCLA	30	0	1.000	NCAA champion^{C}	
1972–73	John Wooden (4)	UCLA	30	0	1.000	NCAA champion^{C}	
1973–74	Digger Phelps	Notre Dame	26	3	.897	NCAA Regional Third Place	
1974–75	Bob Knight	Indiana	31	1	.969	NCAA Elite Eight	
1975–76	Tom Young	Rutgers	31	2	.939	NCAA Final Four	
1976–77	Lee Rose	Charlotte	28	5	.848	NCAA Final Four	
1977–78	Bill Foster	Duke	27	7	.794	NCAA runners-up	
1978–79	Bill Hodges	Indiana State	33	1	.971	NCAA runners-up	
1979–80	Lute Olson	Iowa	23	10	.697	NCAA Final Four	
1980–81	Dale Brown	LSU	31	5	.861	NCAA Final Four	
1981–82	Ralph Miller	Oregon State	25	5	.833	NCAA Elite Eight	
1982–83	Denny Crum	Louisville	32	4	.889	NCAA Final Four	
1983–84	John Thompson Jr.	Georgetown	34	3	.919	NCAA champion^{C}	
1984–85	Lou Carnesecca	St. John's	31	4	.886	NCAA Final Four	
1985–86	Denny Crum (2)	Louisville	32	7	.821	NCAA champion^{C}	
1986–87	Rick Pitino	Providence	25	9	.735	NCAA Final Four	
1987–88	John Chaney	Temple	32	2	.941	NCAA Elite Eight	
1988–89	P. J. Carlesimo	Seton Hall	31	7	.816	NCAA runners-up	
1989–90	Jim Calhoun	UConn	31	6	.838	NCAA Elite Eight	
1990–91	Rick Pitino (2)	Kentucky	22	6	.786	Ineligible for postseason^{[a]}	
1991–92	Mike Krzyzewski	Duke	34	2	.944	NCAA champion^{C}	
1992–93	Eddie Fogler	Vanderbilt	28	6	.824	NCAA Sweet Sixteen	
1993–94	Norm Stewart	Missouri	28	4	.875	NCAA Elite Eight	
1994–95	Jud Heathcote	Michigan State	22	6	.786	NCAA first round	
1995–96	John Calipari	UMass	35^{[b]}	2^{[b]}	.946^{[b]}	NCAA Final Four^{[b]}	
1996–97	Roy Williams	Kansas	34	2	.944	NCAA Sweet Sixteen	
1997–98	Bill Guthridge	North Carolina	34	4	.895	NCAA Final Four	
1998–99	Cliff Ellis	Auburn	29	4	.879	NCAA Sweet Sixteen	
1999–00^{†}	Bob Huggins	Cincinnati	29	4	.879	NCAA second round	
1999–00^{†}	Bill Self	Tulsa	32	5	.865	NCAA Elite Eight	
2000–01	Al Skinner	Boston College	27	5	.844	NCAA second round	
2001–02	Ben Howland	Pittsburgh	29	6	.829	NCAA Sweet Sixteen	
2002–03	Tubby Smith	Kentucky	32	4	.889	NCAA Elite Eight	
2003–04	Mike Montgomery	Stanford	30	2	.938	NCAA second round	
2004–05	Bruce Weber	Illinois	37	2	.949	NCAA runners-up	
2005–06	Bruce Pearl	Tennessee	22	8	.733	NCAA second round	
2006–07	Tony Bennett	Washington State	26	8	.765	NCAA second round	
2007–08	Keno Davis	Drake	28	5	.848	NCAA first round	
2008–09	Bill Self (2)	Kansas	27	8	.771	NCAA Sweet Sixteen	
2009–10	Jim Boeheim	Syracuse	30	5	.857	NCAA Sweet Sixteen	
2010–11	Jamie Dixon	Pittsburgh	28	6	.824	NCAA round of 32^{[c]}	
2011–12	Bill Self (3)	Kansas	32	7	.821	NCAA runners-up	
2012–13	Jim Crews	Saint Louis	28	7	.800	NCAA round of 32	
2013–14	Gregg Marshall	Wichita State	35	1	.972	NCAA round of 32	
2014–15	John Calipari (2)	Kentucky	38	1	.974	NCAA Final Four	
2015–16	Tubby Smith (2)	Texas Tech	19	13	.594	NCAA first round	
2016–17	Mark Few	Gonzaga	37	2	.949	NCAA runners-up	
2017–18	Mick Cronin	Cincinnati	31	5	.861	NCAA round of 32	
2018–19	Mike Young	Wofford	30	5	.857	NCAA round of 32	
2019–20	Anthony Grant	Dayton	29	2	.935	N/A^{[d]}	
2020–21	Juwan Howard	Michigan	23	5	.821	NCAA Elite Eight	
2021–22	Ed Cooley	Providence	27	6	.818	NCAA Sweet Sixteen	
2022–23	Rodney Terry	Texas	29	9	.763	NCAA Elite Eight	
2023–24	Dan Hurley	UConn	37	3	.925	NCAA champion^{C}	
2024–25	Kelvin Sampson	Houston	35	5	.875	NCAA runners-up	
2025–26	Tommy Lloyd	Arizona	36	3	.923	NCAA Final Four	

- ^{a} Kentucky was ineligible to receive the Southeastern Conference (SEC) regular season title, nor participate in the SEC or NCAA tournament because they were in the final year of a multi-year postseason ban.
- ^{b} On May 8, 1997, the NCAA Executive Committee voted to negate the Minutemen's 1996 NCAA tournament record, for Marcus Camby's acceptance of agents' improper gifts. The 35–2 record was reduced to 31–1, and the UMass slot in the Final Four is officially denoted as vacated.
- ^{c} The NCAA men's tournament expanded to 68 teams starting in 2011, with the last four teams earning bids into the tournament set in competition with one another via "First Four" play-in games. The 'second round' then became more commonly referred to as 'round of 32' for specificity.
- ^{d} The COVID-19 pandemic caused the 2019–20 men's season to be canceled prior to any national postseason tournaments occurring.
