= 1990–91 Kentucky Wildcats men's basketball team =

1990–91 season of University of Kentucky men's basketball team

1990–91 Kentucky Wildcats men's basketball
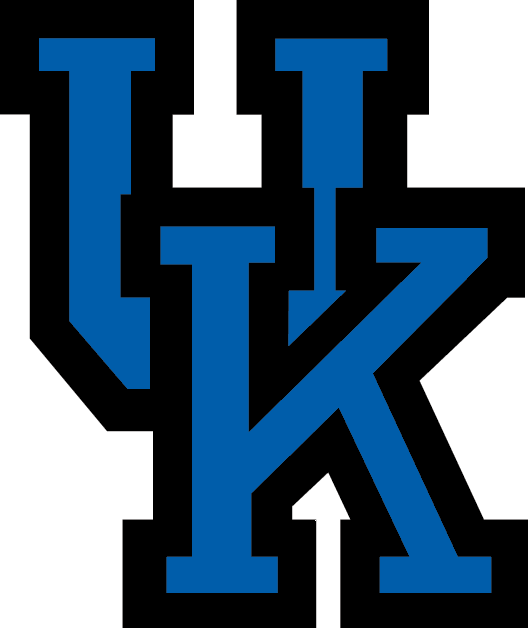
- Conference: Southeastern Conference

Ranking
- Coaches: No. 9
- AP: No. 9
- Record: 22–6 (14–4 SEC)
- Head coach: Rick Pitino (2nd season)
- Assistant coaches: Tubby Smith; Herb Sendek; Billy Donovan; Bernadette Locke-Mattox
- Home arena: Rupp Arena

1990–91 Southeastern Conference men's basketball standings
	Conf.				Overall
Team	W		L	PCT	W		L	PCT
No. 9 Kentucky	14	–	4	.778	22	–	6	.786
No. 21 Mississippi State	13	–	5	.722	20	–	9	.690
No. 22 LSU	13	–	5	.722	20	–	10	.667
No. 19 Alabama †	12	–	6	.667	23	–	10	.697
Vanderbilt	11	–	7	.611	17	–	13	.567
Georgia	9	–	9	.500	17	–	13	.567
Florida	7	–	11	.389	11	–	17	.393
Auburn	5	–	13	.278	13	–	16	.448
Ole Miss	3	–	15	.167	9	–	19	.321
Tennessee	3	–	15	.167	12	–	22	.353
† 1991 SEC tournament winner Rankings from AP poll

The 1990–91 Kentucky Wildcats men's basketball team represented University of Kentucky in the 1990–91 NCAA Division I men's basketball season. The head coach was Rick Pitino and the team finished the season with an overall record of 22–6. While they finished first in the SEC standings, they were ineligible to receive the SEC regular-season title, nor participate in the SEC or NCAA tournaments, as they were in the final year of a multi-year postseason ban.

== Roster ==
1990–91 Kentucky Wildcats men's basketball team
Players
Coaches

Pos.	#	Name	Height	Weight	Year	Previous school	Hometown
G	11	Sean Woods	6 ft 2 in (1.88 m)	180 lb (82 kg)	Jr	Cathedral HS	Indianapolis, IN
F	12	Deron Feldhaus	6 ft 7 in (2.01 m)	210 lb (95 kg)	Jr	Mason County HS	Maysville, KY
G	14	Jeff Brassow	6 ft 5 in (1.96 m)	195 lb (88 kg)	So	Elsik HS	Houston, TX
F	21	Henry Thomas	6 ft 5 in (1.96 m)	160 lb (73 kg)	RS Fr	Clarksville HS	Clarksville, TN
G	23	Junior Braddy	6 ft 3 in (1.91 m)	190 lb (86 kg)	So	Middleburg HS	Jacksonville, FL
F	24	Jamal Mashburn	6 ft 8 in (2.03 m)	240 lb (109 kg)	Fr	Cardinal Hayes HS	Bronx, NY
G	32	Richie Farmer	6 ft 0 in (1.83 m)	170 lb (77 kg)	Jr	Clay County HS	Manchester, KY
F	33	Johnathon Davis	6 ft 8 in (2.03 m)	200 lb (91 kg)	Sr	Pine Forest HS	Pensacola, FL
G/F	34	John Pelphrey	6 ft 7 in (2.01 m)	195 lb (88 kg)	Jr	Paintsville HS	Paintsville, KY
F/C	35	Reggie Hanson	6 ft 7 in (2.01 m)	200 lb (91 kg)	Sr	Pulaski County HS	Somerset, KY
G	42	Carlos Toomer	6 ft 4 in (1.93 m)	190 lb (86 kg)	Fr	Corinth HS	Corinth, MS
F	44	Gimel Martinez	6 ft 8 in (2.03 m)	220 lb (100 kg)	Fr	Miami Senior HS	Miami, FL

Head coach

Rick Pitino (UMass)

Assistant coach(es)

- Tubby Smith (High Point)
- Herb Sendek (Carnegie Mellon)
- Billy Donovan (Providence)
- Bernadette Locke-Mattox (Georgia)

Legend

- (C) Team captain
- (S) Suspended
- (I) Ineligible
- (W) Walk-on
- Injured
- Current redshirt

== Schedule and results ==
Date time, TV	Rank^{#}	Opponent^{#}	Result	Record	Site city, state
Regular Season
November 24, 1990*		Penn	W 85–62	1–0	Rupp Arena; Lexington, Kentucky
November 28, 1990*		at Cincinnati	W 75–71	2–0	Myrl H. Shoemaker Center; Cincinnati, Ohio
December 1, 1990*		Notre Dame	W 98–80	3–0	RCA Dome; Indianapolis, Indiana
December 8, 1990*	No. 25	Kansas	W 88–71	4–0	Rupp Arena; Lexington, Kentucky
December 10, 1990*	No. 18	at No. 9 North Carolina	L 81–84	4–1	Dean Smith Center; Chapel Hill, North Carolina
December 15, 1990*	No. 18	Chattanooga	W 86–70	5–1	Rupp Arena; Lexington, Kentucky
December 18, 1990*	No. 18	at No. 6 Indiana; Rivalry	L 84–87	5–2	Assembly Hall; Bloomington, Indiana
December 21, 1990*	No. 18	Western Kentucky	W 84–70	6–2	Freedom Hall; Louisville, Kentucky
December 27, 1990*	No. 18	Eastern Kentucky	W 74–60	7–2	Rupp Arena; Lexington, Kentucky
December 29, 1990*	No. 18	at Louisville	W 93–85	8–2	Freedom Hall; Louisville, Kentucky
January 2, 1991	No. 16	at Georgia	W 81–80	9–2 (1–0)	Stegeman Coliseum; Athens, Georgia
January 5, 1991	No. 16	No. 14 LSU	W 93–80	10–2 (2–0)	Rupp Arena; Lexington, Kentucky
January 9, 1991	No. 11	Mississippi State	W 89–70	11–2 (3–0)	Rupp Arena; Lexington, Kentucky
January 12, 1991	No. 11	at Tennessee	W 78–74	12–2 (4–0)	Thompson-Boling Arena; Knoxville, Tennessee
January 16, 1991	No. 9	at Ole Miss	W 95–85	13–2 (5–0)	Tad Smith Coliseum; Oxford, Mississippi
January 19, 1991	No. 9	Vanderbilt	W 58–50	14–2 (6–0)	Rupp Arena; Lexington, Kentucky
January 23, 1991	No. 8	Florida	W 81–65	15–2 (7–0)	Rupp Arena; Lexington, Kentucky
January 26, 1981	No. 8	at Alabama	L 83–88	15–3 (7–1)	Coleman Coliseum; Tuscaloosa, Alabama
January 29, 1991	No. 10	at Auburn	W 89–81	16–3 (8–1)	Memorial Coliseum; Auburn, Alabama
February 3, 1991	No. 10	Georgia	W 96–84	17–3 (9–1)	Rupp Arena; Lexington, Kentucky
February 5, 1991	No. 10	No. 19 LSU	L 88–107	17–4 (9–2)	Maravich Assembly Center; Baton Rouge, Louisiana
February 9, 1991	No. 10	at Mississippi State	L 82–83	17–5 (9–3)	Humphrey Coliseum; Starkville, Mississippi
February 13, 1991	No. 16	Tennessee	W 85–74	18–5 (10–3)	Rupp Arena; Lexington, Kentucky
February 16, 1991	No. 16	Ole Miss	W 89–77	19–5 (11–3)	Rupp Arena; Lexington, Kentucky
February 20, 1991	No. 12	at Vanderbilt	L 87–98	19–6 (11–4)	Memorial Gymnasium; Nashville, Tennessee
February 23, 1991	No. 12	at Florida	W 90–74	20–6 (12–4)	O'Connell Center; Gainesville, Florida
February 26, 1991	No. 13	No. 24 Alabama	W 79–73	21–6 (13–4)	Rupp Arena; Lexington, Kentucky
March 2, 1991	No. 13	Auburn	W 114–93	22–6 (14–4)	Rupp Arena; Lexington, Kentucky
*Non-conference game. ^{#}Rankings from AP poll. (#) Tournament seedings in parentheses. SE=Southeast.
