= 1990–91 Vanderbilt Commodores men's basketball team =

American college basketball season

1990–91 Vanderbilt Commodores men's basketball

NCAA tournament
- Conference: Southeastern Conference
- Record: 17–13 (11–7 SEC)
- Head coach: Eddie Fogler (2nd season)
- Home arena: Memorial Gymnasium

1990–91 Southeastern Conference men's basketball standings
	Conf.				Overall
Team	W		L	PCT	W		L	PCT
No. 9 Kentucky	14	–	4	.778	22	–	6	.786
No. 21 Mississippi State	13	–	5	.722	20	–	9	.690
No. 22 LSU	13	–	5	.722	20	–	10	.667
No. 19 Alabama †	12	–	6	.667	23	–	10	.697
Vanderbilt	11	–	7	.611	17	–	13	.567
Georgia	9	–	9	.500	17	–	13	.567
Florida	7	–	11	.389	11	–	17	.393
Auburn	5	–	13	.278	13	–	16	.448
Ole Miss	3	–	15	.167	9	–	19	.321
Tennessee	3	–	15	.167	12	–	22	.353
† 1991 SEC tournament winner Rankings from AP poll

The 1990–91 Vanderbilt Commodores men's basketball team represented Vanderbilt University as a member of the Southeastern Conference during the 1990–91 college basketball season. The team was led by head coach Eddie Fogler and played its home games at Memorial Gymnasium.

The Commodores finished with a 17–13 record (11–7 SEC, 5th) and received an at-large bid to the NCAA tournament.

== Roster ==
1990–91 Vanderbilt Commodores men's basketball team
Players	Coaches
Pos. / # / Name / Height / Weight / Year / Hometown; C / 52 / John Amaechi / 6 ft 10 in (2.08 m) / 255 lb (116 kg) / Fr	Head coach: Eddie Fogler (North Carolina); Assistant coach(es) Legend: (C) Team captain; (S) Suspended; (I) Ineligible; (W) Walk-on; Injured; Current redshirt

== Schedule and results ==
Date time, TV	Rank^{#}	Opponent^{#}	Result	Record	Site (attendance) city, state
Regular season
Nov 14, 1990*		at No. 2 Arkansas; Preseason NIT	L 70–107	0–1	Barnhill Arena; Fayetteville, Arkansas
Nov 26, 1990*		UNC Asheville	W 103–66	1–1	Memorial Gymnasium; Nashville, Tennessee
Nov 30, 1990*		Hawaii	W 74–70	2–1	Palo Alto, California
Dec 1, 1990*		George Washington	W 76–74	3–1	Palo Alto, California
Dec 4, 1990*		No. 7 Indiana	L 73–84	3–2	Memorial Gymnasium; Nashville, Tennessee
Dec 8, 1990*		at No. 21 Virginia	L 56–70	3–3	University Hall; Charlottesville, Virginia
Dec 11, 1990		No. 11 Georgia	W 75–74 ^{OT}	4–3 (1–0)	Memorial Gymnasium; Nashville, Tennessee
Dec 20, 1990*		VMI	W 79–60	5–3	Memorial Gymnasium; Nashville, Tennessee
Dec 22, 1990*		SMU	W 68–65	6–3	Memorial Gymnasium; Nashville, Tennessee
Dec 28, 1990*		Fordham	L 65–66	6–4	Memorial Gymnasium; Nashville, Tennessee
Dec 29, 1990*		Rice	W 75–68	7–4	Memorial Gymnasium; Nashville, Tennessee
Jan 2, 1991		at No. 14 LSU	L 70–87	7–5 (1–1)	Maravich Assembly Center; Baton Rouge, Louisiana
Jan 5, 1991		Alabama	W 66–55	8–5 (2–1)	Memorial Gymnasium; Nashville, Tennessee
Jan 8, 1991		Tennessee	W 108–68	9–5 (3–1)	Memorial Gymnasium; Nashville, Tennessee
Jan 12, 1991		at Mississippi State	L 62–85	9–6 (3–2)	Humphrey Coliseum; Starkville, Mississippi
Jan 16, 1991		at Auburn	W 80–59	10–6 (4–2)	Memorial Coliseum; Auburn, Alabama
Jan 19, 1991		at No. 9 Kentucky	L 50–58	10–7 (4–3)	Rupp Arena; Lexington, Kentucky
Jan 23, 1991		Ole Miss	W 89–52	11–7 (5–3)	Memorial Gymnasium; Nashville, Tennessee
Jan 30, 1991		at Florida	W 60–57	12–7 (6–3)	O'Connell Center; Gainesville, Florida
Feb 2, 1991		No. 14 LSU	W 63–59	13–7 (7–3)	Memorial Gymnasium; Nashville, Tennessee
Feb 6, 1991		Mississippi State	W 91–70	14–7 (8–3)	Memorial Gymnasium; Nashville, Tennessee
Feb 9, 1991		at Tennessee	L 73–85	14–8 (8–4)	Thompson-Boling Arena; Knoxville, Tennessee
Feb 13, 1991		at Alabama	L 55–66	14–9 (8–5)	Coleman Coliseum; Tuscaloosa, Alabama
Feb 16, 1991		Auburn	W 90–70	15–9 (9–5)	Memorial Gymnasium; Nashville, Tennessee
Feb 20, 1991		No. 12 Kentucky	W 98–87	16–9 (10–5)	Memorial Gymnasium; Nashville, Tennessee
Feb 23, 1991		at Ole Miss	L 58–74	16–10 (10–6)	Tad Smith Coliseum; Oxford, Mississippi
Feb 27, 1991		at Georgia	L 59–62	16–11 (10–7)	Stegeman Coliseum; Athens, Georgia
Mar 2, 1991		Florida	W 82–68	17–11 (11–7)	Memorial Gymnasium; Nashville, Tennessee
SEC tournament
Mar 8, 1991*		Georgia; SEC Tournament Quarterfinal	L 72–80	17–12	Memorial Gymnasium; Nashville, Tennessee
NCAA tournament
Mar 15, 1991*	(9 W)	vs. (8 W) Georgetown; First Round	L 60–70	17–13	McKale Center; Tucson, Arizona
*Non-conference game. ^{#}Rankings from AP Poll. (#) Tournament seedings in parentheses. W=West. All times are in Central Time.
