= 1990–91 South Alabama Jaguars basketball team =

American college basketball season

1990–91 South Alabama Jaguars basketball

Sun Belt Regular season champions Sun Belt tournament champions

NCAA tournament, first round
- Conference: Sun Belt Conference
- East Division
- Record: 22–9 (11–3 Sun Belt)
- Head coach: Ronnie Arrow (4th season)
- Assistant coach: Lew Hill
- Home arena: Jaguar Gym

1990–91 Sun Belt Conference men's basketball standings
	Conf.				Overall
Team	W		L	PCT	W		L	PCT
South Alabama †	11	–	3	.786	22	–	9	.710
UAB	9	–	5	.643	18	–	13	.581
South Florida	8	–	6	.571	19	–	11	.633
Western Kentucky	8	–	6	.571	14	–	14	.500
VCU	7	–	7	.500	14	–	17	.452
Old Dominion	5	–	9	.357	14	–	18	.438
UNC Charlotte	6	–	8	.429	14	–	14	.500
Jacksonville	2	–	12	.143	6	–	22	.214
† 1991 Sun Belt Conference tournament winner Rankings from AP Poll

The 1990–91 South Alabama Jaguars basketball team represented the University of South Alabama during the 1990–91 NCAA Division I men's basketball season. The Jaguars were led by head coach Ronnie Arrow, in the fourth year of his first stint as head coach. They played their home games at the Mitchell Center, and were members of the Sun Belt Conference. They finished the season 22–9, 11–3 in Sun Belt play to finish in first place. They won the Sun Belt tournament to earn an automatic bid to the 1991 NCAA tournament as the 13 seed in the West region. In the opening round, the Jaguars lost to Utah.

== Roster ==
1990–91 South Alabama Jaguars men's basketball team
Players	Coaches
Pos. / # / Name / Height / Weight / Year / Hometown	Head coach: Ronnie Arrow (Texas State); Assistant coach(es): Lew Hill (Wichita State); Legend: (C) Team captain; (S) Suspended; (I) Ineligible; (W) Walk-on; Injured; Current redshirt

== Schedule and results ==
Date time, TV	Rank^{#}	Opponent^{#}	Result	Record	Site (attendance) city, state
Regular season
Nov 27, 1990*		Jackson State	W 90–75	1–0	Jaguar Gym; Mobile, Alabama
Dec 1, 1990*		at McNeese State	W 74–54	2–0	Burton Coliseum; Lake Charles, Louisiana
Dec 5, 1990*		Hawaii-Loa	W 103–86	3–0	Jaguar Gym; Mobile, Alabama
Dec 8, 1990*		Southern Illinois	W 87–82	4–0	Jaguar Gym; Mobile, Alabama
Dec 11, 1990*		at No. 2 Arkansas	L 91–101	4–1	Barnhill Arena; Fayetteville, Arkansas
Dec 15, 1990*		at New Orleans	L 95–96 ^{OT}	4–2	Lakefront Arena; New Orleans, Louisiana
Dec 17, 1990*		Creighton	L 76–89	4–3	Jaguar Gym; Mobile, Alabama
Dec 22, 1990*		James Madison	W 74–65	5–3	Jaguar Gym; Mobile, Alabama
Dec 28, 1990*		vs. Murray State; BMA Holiday Classic	L 78–88 ^{OT}	5–4	Kemper Arena; Kansas City, Missouri
Dec 29, 1990*		vs. Texas A&M; BMA Holiday Classic	W 70–68	6–4	Kemper Arena; Kansas City, Missouri
Jan 5, 1991		UNC Charlotte	W 121–105	7–4 (1–0)	Jaguar Gym; Mobile, Alabama
Jan 7, 1991		Old Dominion	W 100–89	8–4 (2–0)	Jaguar Gym; Mobile, Alabama
Jan 10, 1991		at VCU	L 83–93	8–5 (2–1)	
Jan 12, 1991		at UNC Charlotte	W 95–88	9–5 (3–1)	
Jan 19, 1991*		at Louisville	L 83–85	9–6	Freedom Hall; Louisville, Kentucky
Jan 22, 1991		South Florida	W 82–81	10–6 (4–1)	Jaguar Gym; Mobile, Alabama
Jan 24, 1991		at Old Dominion	W 88–80	11–6 (5–1)	
Jan 28, 1991		Western Kentucky	W 82–78	12–6 (6–1)	Jaguar Gym; Mobile, Alabama
Feb 4, 1991		VCU	W 91–78	13–6 (7–1)	Jaguar Gym; Mobile, Alabama
Feb 7, 1991		at Jacksonville	W 97–76	14–6 (8–1)	
Feb 9, 1991		at South Florida	L 66–68	14–7 (8–2)	
Feb 14, 1991*		at No. 9 Southern Miss	W 92–85	15–7	Reed Green Coliseum; Hattiesburg, Mississippi
Feb 16, 1991		UAB	W 87–79	16–7 (9–2)	Jaguar Gym; Mobile, Alabama
Feb 18, 1991		Jacksonville	W 68–66	17–7 (10–2)	Jaguar Gym; Mobile, Alabama
Feb 21, 1991		at Western Kentucky	W 100–91	18–7 (11–2)	
Feb 23, 1991		at UAB	L 99–107	18–8 (11–3)	UAB Arena; Birmingham, Alabama
Feb 27, 1991*		Prairie View A&M	W 131–93	19–8	Jaguar Gym; Mobile, Alabama
Sun Belt Conference tournament
Mar 2, 1991*	(1)	vs. (8) Jacksonville; Championship Game	W 84–68	20–8	Mobile Civic Center; Mobile, Alabama
Mar 3, 1991*	(1)	vs. (5) VCU; Championship Game	W 105–78	21–8	Mobile Civic Center; Mobile, Alabama
Mar 4, 1991*	(1)	vs. (6) Old Dominion; Championship Game	W 86–81	22–8	Mobile Civic Center; Mobile, Alabama
NCAA tournament
Mar 15, 1991*	(13 W)	vs. (4 W) No. 10 Utah; First Round	L 72–82	22–9	McKale Center; Tucson, Arizona
*Non-conference game. ^{#}Rankings from AP Poll. (#) Tournament seedings in parentheses. W=West. All times are in Central Time.
