= 1990–91 Florida State Seminoles men's basketball team =

American college basketball season

1990–91 Florida State Seminoles men's basketball

Metro Conference tournament champions

NCAA tournament, Second round
- Conference: Metro Conference (1975–1995)
- Record: 21–11 (9–5 Metro)
- Head coach: Pat Kennedy (5th season)
- Home arena: Tallahassee-Leon County Civic Center

1990–91 Metro Conference men's basketball standings
	Conf.				Overall
Team	W		L	PCT	W		L	PCT
No. 25 Southern Miss	10	–	4	.714	21	–	8	.724
Florida State †	9	–	5	.643	21	–	11	.656
Cincinnati	8	–	6	.571	18	–	12	.600
Tulane	7	–	7	.500	15	–	13	.536
Memphis	7	–	7	.500	17	–	15	.531
Virginia Tech	6	–	8	.429	13	–	16	.448
South Carolina	5	–	9	.357	20	–	13	.606
Louisville	4	–	10	.286	14	–	16	.467
† 1991 Metro Conference tournament winner Rankings from AP Poll

The 1990–91 Florida State Seminoles men's basketball team represented Florida State University in the program's final season as members of the Metro Conference during the 1990–91 NCAA Division I men's basketball season. Led by head coach Pat Kennedy, the Seminoles reached the second round of the NCAA tournament. The team finished with an overall record of 21–11 (9–5 Metro).

== Roster ==
1990–91 Florida State Seminoles men's basketball team
Players
Coaches

Pos.	#	Name	Height	Weight	Year	Previous school	Hometown
G	4	Chuck Graham	6 ft 3 in (1.91 m)	190 lb (86 kg)	So	Richmond Academy	Augusta, Georgia
G	5	Malcolm Nicholas	6 ft 3 in (1.91 m)	180 lb (82 kg)	So	Miami Senior	Miami, Florida
G	10	Chad Copeland	5 ft 11 in (1.8 m)	170 lb (77 kg)	So	Bradley	Cleveland, Tennessee
G	11	Lorenzo Hands	6 ft 3 in (1.91 m)	195 lb (88 kg)	Jr	Twin Lakes	West Palm Beach, Florida
G	12	Charlie Ward	6 ft 1 in (1.85 m)	190 lb (86 kg)	Fr	Central	Thomasville, Georgia
F	20	Aubry Boyd	6 ft 6 in (1.98 m)	203 lb (92 kg)	Sr	Southwest	Macon, Georgia
F	21	Jesse Salters	6 ft 6 in (1.98 m)	195 lb (88 kg)	Fr	Chamberlain	Tampa, Florida
G	22	Derrick Myers	6 ft 1 in (1.85 m)	185 lb (84 kg)	Jr	Allegany JC	Pittsburgh, Pennsylvania
G	23	Ron Miller	6 ft 3 in (1.91 m)	190 lb (86 kg)	Jr	Mercer	Tallahassee, Florida
F	32	Doug Edwards	6 ft 9 in (2.06 m)	220 lb (100 kg)	So	Miami Senior	Miami, Florida
C	34	Rodney Dobard	6 ft 9 in (2.06 m)	210 lb (95 kg)	So	Atlantic	Delray Beach, Florida
F	45	Michael Polite	6 ft 7 in (2.01 m)	215 lb (98 kg)	Sr	Mainland	Daytona Beach, Florida

Head coach

- Pat Kennedy (King's College)

Assistant coach(es)

- Kenny Williamson
- David Zimroth
- Tom Carlson

Legend

- (C) Team captain
- (S) Suspended
- (I) Ineligible
- (W) Walk-on
- Injured
- Current redshirt

== Schedule ==
Date time, TV	Rank^{#}	Opponent^{#}	Result	Record	Site city, state
Regular season
Nov 27, 1990*		vs. Texas Southern	W 95–71	1–0	Tallahassee-Leon County Civic Center; Tallahassee, FL
Nov 30, 1990*		Florida	L 68–85	1–1	Tallahassee-Leon County Civic Center; Tallahassee, FL
Dec 3, 1990*		Morgan State	W 89–48	2–1	Tallahassee-Leon County Civic Center; Tallahassee, FL
Dec 9, 1990*		La Salle	W 83–74	3–1	Tallahassee-Leon County Civic Center; Tallahassee, FL
Dec 15, 1990*		at Auburn	L 96–99	3–2	Beard–Eaves–Memorial Coliseum; Auburn, AL
Dec 18, 1990*		South Florida	W 80–72	4–2	Tallahassee-Leon County Civic Center; Tallahassee, FL
Dec 22, 1990*		at No. 1 UNLV	L 69–101	4–3	Thomas & Mack Center; Las Vegas, NV
Dec 29, 1990*		at Florida International	W 92–73	5–3	U.S. Century Bank Arena; Miami, FL
Jan 3, 1991		at Tulane	L 61–77	5–4 (0–1)	Avron B. Fogelman Arena; New Orleans, LA
Mar 2, 1991		South Carolina	W 70–59	17–10 (9–5)	Tallahassee-Leon County Civic Center; Tallahassee, FL
Metro Conference tournament
Mar 7, 1991*		vs. South Carolina; Metro Conference tournament Quarterfinal	W 65–55	18–10	Roanoke Civic Center; Roanoke, VA
Mar 8, 1991*		vs. Virginia Tech; Metro Conference tournament Semifinal	W 91–71	19–10	Roanoke Civic Center; Roanoke, VA
Mar 9, 1991*		vs. Louisville; Metro Conference tournament championship	W 76–69	20–10	Roanoke Civic Center; Roanoke, VA
NCAA Tournament
Mar 14, 1991*	(7 W)	vs. (10 W) USC; First Round	W 75–72	21–10	Freedom Hall; Louisville, KY
Mar 16, 1991*	(7 W)	vs. (2 W) No. 3 Indiana; Second Round	L 60–82	21–11	Freedom Hall; Louisville, KY
*Non-conference game. ^{#}Rankings from AP. (#) Tournament seedings in parentheses. SE=Southeast. All times are in Eastern.
