= 1990–91 LSU Tigers basketball team =

American college basketball team

1990–91 LSU Tigers basketball

SEC regular season co-champions

NCAA tournament, First Round
- Conference: Southeast Conference
- West Division

Ranking
- Coaches: No. 21
- AP: No. 22
- Record: 20–10 (13–5 SEC)
- Head coach: Dale Brown (19th season)
- Assistant coaches: Johnny Jones (7th season); Bob Starkey (1st season)
- Home arena: Pete Maravich Assembly Center

1990–91 Southeastern Conference men's basketball standings
| | Conf. | | | | Overall |
| Team | W | | L | PCT | W | | L | PCT |
|---|---|---|---|---|---|---|---|---|
| No. 9 Kentucky | 14 | – | 4 | .778 | 22 | – | 6 | .786 |
| No. 21 Mississippi State | 13 | – | 5 | .722 | 20 | – | 9 | .690 |
| No. 22 LSU | 13 | – | 5 | .722 | 20 | – | 10 | .667 |
| No. 19 Alabama † | 12 | – | 6 | .667 | 23 | – | 10 | .697 |
| Vanderbilt | 11 | – | 7 | .611 | 17 | – | 13 | .567 |
| Georgia | 9 | – | 9 | .500 | 17 | – | 13 | .567 |
| Florida | 7 | – | 11 | .389 | 11 | – | 17 | .393 |
| Auburn | 5 | – | 13 | .278 | 13 | – | 16 | .448 |
| Ole Miss | 3 | – | 15 | .167 | 9 | – | 19 | .321 |
| Tennessee | 3 | – | 15 | .167 | 12 | – | 22 | .353 |
† 1991 SEC tournament winner Rankings from AP poll

The 1990-91 LSU Tigers men's basketball team represented Louisiana State University during the 1990–91 NCAA men's college basketball season. The head coach was Dale Brown. The team was a member of the Southeastern Conference and played their home games at Pete Maravich Assembly Center.

== Roster ==
1990–91 LSU Tigers men's basketball team
Players
Coaches

| Pos. | # | Name | Height | Weight | Year | Previous school | Hometown |
|---|---|---|---|---|---|---|---|
| F | 24 | Vernel Singleton | 6 ft 7 in (2.01 m) | 210 lb (95 kg) | Jr | S Natchez | Natchez, MS |
| F | 32 | Harold Boudreaux | 6 ft 9 in (2.06 m) | 238 lb (108 kg) | Jr | Cecilia HS | Arnaudville, LA |
| C | 33 | Shaquille O'Neal | 7 ft 1 in (2.16 m) | 290 lb (132 kg) | So | Robert G. Cole | Newark, NJ |
| C | 43 | Geert Hammink | 7 ft 0 in (2.13 m) | 260 lb (118 kg) | So | | Didam, Netherlands |
| F | 44 | Wayne Sims | 6 ft 7 in (2.01 m) | 247 lb (112 kg) | Sr | DeRidder HS | DeRidder, LA |

Head coach

- Dale Brown (Minot State)

Assistant coach(es)

Legend

- (C) Team captain
- (S) Suspended
- (I) Ineligible
- (W) Walk-on
- Injured
- Current redshirt

== Schedule and results ==
| Date time, TV | Rank^{#} | Opponent^{#} | Result | Record | Site city, state |
Non-conference regular season
| Nov 24, 1990* | No. 14 | vs. Villanova; Tip Off Classic | L 91–93 | 0–1 | Springfield Civic Center; Springfield, MA |
| Nov 26, 1990* | No. 14 | SE Louisiana | W 117–68 | 1–1 | Maravich Assembly Center; Baton Rouge, LA |
| Nov 30, 1990* | No. 20 | No. 22 Texas | W 101–87 | 2–1 | Maravich Assembly Center; Baton Rouge, LA |
| Dec 7, 1990* | No. 18 | Chapman | W 101–68 | 3–1 | Maravich Assembly Center; Baton Rouge, LA |
| Dec 8, 1990* | No. 18 | No. 2 Arizona | W 92–82 | 4–1 | Maravich Assembly Center; Baton Rouge, LA |
| Dec 18, 1990* | No. 10 | Arkansas State | W 98–74 | 5–1 | Maravich Assembly Center; Baton Rouge, LA |
| Dec 20, 1990* | No. 10 | Loyola Marymount | W 122–114 | 6–1 | Maravich Assembly Center; Baton Rouge, LA |
| Dec 22, 1990* | No. 10 | at Illinois | L 96–102 | 6–2 | Assembly Hall (14,824); Champaign, IL |
| Dec 29, 1990* | No. 15 | Nicholls State | W 118–76 | 7–2 | Maravich Assembly Center; Baton Rouge, LA |
SEC regular season
| Jan 2, 1991 | No. 14 | Vanderbilt | W 87–70 | 8–2 (1–0) | Maravich Assembly Center; Baton Rouge, LA |
| Jan 5, 1991 | No. 14 | at No. 16 Kentucky | L 80–93 | 8–3 (1–1) | Rupp Arena; Lexington, KY |
| Jan 8, 1991 | No. 20 | Georgia | W 83–76 | 9–3 (2–1) | Maravich Assembly Center; Baton Rouge, LA |
| Jan 12, 1991 | No. 20 | at Auburn | W 96–84 | 10–3 (3–1) | Beard–Eaves–Memorial Coliseum; Auburn, AL |
| Jan 15, 1991 | No. 20 | at Alabama | W 90–80 | 11–3 (4–1) | Coleman Coliseum; Tuscaloosa, AL |
| Jan 19, 1991 | No. 20 | Ole Miss | W 87–71 | 12–3 (5–1) | Maravich Assembly Center; Baton Rouge, LA |
| Jan 22, 1991 | No. 16 | at Tennessee | L 89–92 | 12–4 (5–2) | Thompson-Boling Arena; Knoxville, TN |
| Jan 26, 1991 | No. 16 | Florida | W 76–66 | 13–4 (6–2) | Maravich Assembly Center; Baton Rouge, LA |
| Jan 30, 1991 | No. 14 | Mississippi State | L 79–82 | 13–5 (6–3) | Maravich Assembly Center; Baton Rouge, LA |
| Feb 2, 1991 | No. 14 | at Vanderbilt | L 59–63 | 13–6 (6–4) | Memorial Gymnasium; Nashville, TN |
| Feb 5, 1991 | No. 19 | No. 10 Kentucky | W 107–88 | 14–6 (7–4) | Maravich Assembly Center; Baton Rouge, LA |
| Feb 8, 1991 | No. 19 | at Georgia | W 89–86 | 15–6 (8–4) | Stegeman Coliseum; Athens, GA |
| Feb 10, 1991* | No. 19 | at No. 6 Duke | L 70–88 | 15–7 | Cameron Indoor Stadium; Durham, NC |
| Feb 13, 1991 | No. 20 | Auburn | W 98–61 | 16–7 (9–4) | Maravich Assembly Center; Baton Rouge, LA |
| Feb 17, 1991 | No. 20 | Alabama | W 88–81 | 17–7 (10–4) | Maravich Assembly Center; Baton Rouge, LA |
| Feb 20, 1991 | No. 19 | at Ole Miss | W 89–78 | 18–7 (11–4) | C.M. "Tad" Smith Coliseum; Oxford, MS |
| Feb 23, 1991 | No. 19 | Tennessee | W 119–87 | 19–7 (12–4) | Maravich Assembly Center; Baton Rouge, LA |
| Feb 27, 1991 | No. 18 | at Florida | W 79–66 | 20–7 (13–4) | Stephen C. O'Connell Center; Gainesville, FL |
| Mar 2, 1991 | No. 18 | at No. 23 Mississippi State | L 73–76 | 20–8 (13–5) | Humphrey Coliseum; Starkville, MS |
SEC Tournament
| Mar 8, 1991* | No. 16 | vs. Auburn | L 77–92 | 20–9 | Memorial Gymnasium; Nashville, TN |
NCAA Tournament
| March 14*; CBS | (6 MW) No. 22 | vs. (11 MW) Connecticut; NCAA Tournament First Round | L 62–79 | 20–10 | Hubert H. Humphrey Metrodome (25,348); Minneapolis, MN |
*Non-conference game. ^{#}Rankings from AP Poll. (#) Tournament seedings in parentheses. MW=Midwest.

== Awards and honors ==
- Shaquille O'Neal – SEC Player of the Year, Consensus First-team All-American
