= 1990–91 Georgia Bulldogs basketball team =

American college basketball season

1990–91 Georgia Bulldogs basketball

NCAA tournament
- Conference: Southeastern Conference
- Record: 17–13 (9–9 SEC)
- Head coach: Hugh Durham (13th season)
- Assistant coaches: Don Beasley; Larry Gay; Joe Cunningham
- Home arena: Stegeman Coliseum

1990–91 Southeastern Conference men's basketball standings
	Conf.				Overall
Team	W		L	PCT	W		L	PCT
No. 9 Kentucky	14	–	4	.778	22	–	6	.786
No. 21 Mississippi State	13	–	5	.722	20	–	9	.690
No. 22 LSU	13	–	5	.722	20	–	10	.667
No. 19 Alabama †	12	–	6	.667	23	–	10	.697
Vanderbilt	11	–	7	.611	17	–	13	.567
Georgia	9	–	9	.500	17	–	13	.567
Florida	7	–	11	.389	11	–	17	.393
Auburn	5	–	13	.278	13	–	16	.448
Ole Miss	3	–	15	.167	9	–	19	.321
Tennessee	3	–	15	.167	12	–	22	.353
† 1991 SEC tournament winner Rankings from AP poll

The 1990–91 Georgia Bulldogs basketball team represented the University of Georgia as a member of the Southeastern Conference during the 1990–91 NCAA men's basketball season. The team was led by head coach Hugh Durham, and played their home games at Stegeman Coliseum in Athens, Georgia. The Bulldogs finished 6th during the SEC Regular season, and received an at-large bid to the NCAA tournament as No. 11 seed in the Southeast region. They were defeated by No. 6 seed Pittsburgh, 76–68 in overtime, in the opening round to finish the season at 17–13 (9–9 SEC).

== Roster ==
1990–91 Georgia Bulldogs men's basketball team
Players
Coaches

Pos.	#	Name	Height	Weight	Year	Hometown
PG	11	Litterial Green	6 ft 1 in (1.85 m)	175 lb (79 kg)	Jr	Moss Point, Mississippi
PF		Antonio Harvey	6 ft 11 in (2.11 m)	240 lb (109 kg)	RS So	Pascagoula, Mississippi

Head coach

- Hugh Durham (Florida State)

Assistant coach(es)

- Don Beasley (Northwestern State)
- Larry Gay (Florida State)
- Joe Cunningham

Legend

- (C) Team captain
- (S) Suspended
- (I) Ineligible
- (W) Walk-on
- Injured
- Current redshirt

== Schedule and results ==
Date time, TV	Rank^{#}	Opponent^{#}	Result	Record	Site city, state
Non-conference Regular season
Nov 23, 1990*	No. 21	vs. Wichita State; Central Fidelity Classic	W 89–58	1–0	Robins Center; Richmond, Virginia
Nov 24, 1990*	No. 21	at Richmond; Central Fidelity Classic	W 90–45	2–0	Robins Center; Richmond, Virginia
Nov 28, 1990*		Western Kentucky	W 124–65	3–0	Stegeman Coliseum; Athens, Georgia
Nov 30, 1990*		Armstrong State	W 70–54	4–0	Stegeman Coliseum; Athens, Georgia
Dec 8, 1990*		at Mercer	W 117–50	5–0	Hawkins Arena; Macon, Georgia
Dec 11, 1990		at Vanderbilt	L 74–75 ^{OT}	5–1 (0–1)	Memorial Gymnasium; Nashville, Tennessee
Dec 14, 1990*		at Miami (FL)	W 78–60	6–1	Miami Arena; Miami, Florida
Dec 19, 1990*		at Georgia Tech	L 105–112 ^{3OT}	6–2	Alexander Memorial Coliseum; Atlanta, Georgia
Dec 22, 1990*	No. 17	vs. No. 23 Texas; Kuppenheimer Classic	W 79–71	7–2	Atlanta, Georgia
Dec 29, 1990*	No. 17	Purdue	L 63–64	7–3	Stegeman Coliseum; Athens, Georgia
SEC Regular season
Jan 2, 1991		Kentucky	L 80–81	7–4 (0–2)	Stegeman Coliseum; Athens, Georgia
Jan 5, 1991		Tennessee	W 107–86	8–4 (1–2)	Stegeman Coliseum; Athens, Georgia
Jan 7, 1991		at No. 20 LSU	L 76–83	8–5 (1–3)	Maravich Assembly Center; Baton Rouge, Louisiana
Jan 12, 1991		Florida	W 79–54	9–5 (2–3)	Stegeman Coliseum; Athens, Georgia
Jan 16, 1991		at Mississippi State	W 81–74	10–5 (3–3)	Humphrey Coliseum; Starkville, Mississippi
Jan 19, 1991		at Alabama	L 62–67	10–6 (3–4)	Coleman Coliseum; Tuscaloosa, Alabama
Jan 23, 1991		Auburn	L 58–59	10–7 (3–5)	Stegeman Coliseum; Athens, Georgia
Jan 30, 1991		Ole Miss	W 117–62	11–7 (4–5)	Stegeman Coliseum; Athens, Georgia
Feb 3, 1991		at Kentucky	L 84–96	11–8 (4–6)	Rupp Arena; Lexington, Kentucky
Feb 6, 1991		at Tennessee	W 87–78	12–8 (5–6)	Thompson-Boling Arena; Knoxville, Tennessee
Feb 8, 1991		No. 19 LSU	L 86-89	12–9 (5–7)	Stegeman Coliseum; Athens, Georgia
Feb 8, 1991		at Florida	L 75-90	12–10 (5–8)	O'Connell Center; Gainesville, Florida
Feb 16, 1991		No. 23 Mississippi State	L 64–70	12–11 (5–9)	Stegeman Coliseum; Athens, Georgia
Feb 20, 1991		Alabama	W 73–68	13–11 (6–9)	Stegeman Coliseum; Athens, Georgia
Feb 23, 1991		at Auburn	W 86–77	14–11 (7–9)	Joel H. Eaves Memorial Coliseum; Auburn, Alabama
Feb 27, 1991		Vanderbilt	W 62–59	15–11 (8–9)	Stegeman Coliseum; Athens, Georgia
Mar 2, 1991		at Ole Miss	W 72–62	16–11 (9–9)	Tad Smith Coliseum; Oxford, Mississippi
SEC Tournament
Mar 8, 1991*		at Vanderbilt	W 80–72	17–11	Memorial Gymnasium; Nashville, Tennessee
Mar 9, 1991*		vs. Tennessee	L 65–85	17–12	Memorial Gymnasium; Nashville, Tennessee
NCAA Tournament
Mar 14, 1991*	(11 SE)	vs. (6 SE) Pittsburgh; First Round	L 68–76 ^{OT}	17–13	Freedom Hall; Louisville, Kentucky
*Non-conference game. ^{#}Rankings from AP Poll. (#) Tournament seedings in parentheses. SE=Southeast. All times are in Eastern Time.
