= 1990–91 Alabama Crimson Tide men's basketball team =

American college basketball season

1990–91 Alabama Crimson Tide men's basketball

SEC tournament champions

NCAA tournament, Sweet Sixteen
- Conference: Southeastern Conference

Ranking
- Coaches: No. 16
- AP: No. 19
- Record: 23–10 (12–6, 4th SEC)
- Head coach: Wimp Sanderson (11th season)
- Home arena: Coleman Coliseum

1990–91 Southeastern Conference men's basketball standings
	Conf.				Overall
Team	W		L	PCT	W		L	PCT
No. 9 Kentucky	14	–	4	.778	22	–	6	.786
No. 21 Mississippi State	13	–	5	.722	20	–	9	.690
No. 22 LSU	13	–	5	.722	20	–	10	.667
No. 19 Alabama †	12	–	6	.667	23	–	10	.697
Vanderbilt	11	–	7	.611	17	–	13	.567
Georgia	9	–	9	.500	17	–	13	.567
Florida	7	–	11	.389	11	–	17	.393
Auburn	5	–	13	.278	13	–	16	.448
Ole Miss	3	–	15	.167	9	–	19	.321
Tennessee	3	–	15	.167	12	–	22	.353
† 1991 SEC tournament winner Rankings from AP poll

The 1990–91 Alabama Crimson Tide men's basketball team represented the University of Alabama in the 1990-91 NCAA Division I men's basketball season. The team's head coach was Wimp Sanderson, who was in his eleventh season at Alabama. The team played their home games at Coleman Coliseum in Tuscaloosa, Alabama. They finished the season with a record of 23–10, 12–6 in conference, good for fourth place.

Forwards David Benoit and Keith Askins graduated and moved to the NBA, but the Tide was bolstered by freshman signee James "Hollywood" Robinson and junior college transfer Latrell Sprewell from Milwaukee, Wisconsin.

The Tide won the 1991 SEC men's basketball tournament, their third straight SEC tournament title, beating Tennessee in the final and earning a third consecutive automatic bid to the NCAA tournament. The Tide also advanced all the way to the Sweet 16 for the second year in a row, defeating Murray State and Wake Forest before losing to Arkansas.

== Roster ==
1990–91 Alabama Crimson Tide men's basketball team
Players
Coaches

Pos.	#	Name	Height	Weight	Year	Previous school	Hometown
G	20	James Robinson	6 ft 2 in (1.88 m)	—	Fr	Murrah High School	Jackson, Mississippi
F	44	Melvin Cheatum	6 ft 8 in (2.03 m)	200 lb (91 kg)	Sr	Livingston High School	Livingston, Alabama
G	12	Gary Waites	6 ft 2 in (1.88 m)	—	Sr	Decatur High School	Decatur, Georgia
G	15	Latrell Sprewell	6 ft 5 in (1.96 m)	—	Jr	Three Rivers CC, Missouri	Milwaukee, Wisconsin
G	22	Bryant Lancaster	6 ft 3 in (1.91 m)	—	Jr	Valley High School	Valley, Alabama
F	25	Robert Horry	6 ft 9 in (2.06 m)	—	Jr	Andalusia (AL) High School	Harford County, Maryland
G	14	James Sanders	6 ft 2 in (1.88 m)	—	Jr
F	54	Marcus Webb	6 ft 9 in (2.06 m)	—	Jr	Sidney Lanier High School	Montgomery, Alabama
C	32	Marcus Campbell	6 ft 8 in (2.03 m)	—	Jr	Livingston High School	Livingston, Alabama

Head coach

- Wimp Sanderson

Assistant coach(es)

Legend

- (C) Team captain
- (S) Suspended
- (I) Ineligible
- (W) Walk-on
- Injured
- Current redshirt

== Schedule and results ==
Date time, TV	Rank^{#}	Opponent^{#}	Result	Record	Site city, state
Non-conference Regular season
Nov 24, 1990*	No. 7	Delaware	W 72–47	1–0	Coleman Coliseum; Tuscaloosa, Alabama
Nov 27, 1990*	No. 6	Wake Forest	W 96–95 ^{OT}	2–0	Coleman Coliseum; Tuscaloosa, Alabama
Nov 30, 1990*	No. 6	vs. No. 19 Southern Miss	L 82–84	2–1	Mississippi Coast Coliseum; Biloxi, Mississippi
Dec 4, 1990*	No. 12	at Wichita State	L 71–74 ^{OT}	2–2	Levitt Arena; Wichita, Kansas
Dec 15, 1990*	No. 20	at No. 9 North Carolina	L 79–95	2–3	Dean Smith Center; Chapel Hill, North Carolina
Dec 18, 1990*		VMI	W 79–45	3–3	Coleman Coliseum; Tuscaloosa, Alabama
Dec 21, 1990*		at Chattanooga	W 62–58	4–3	McKenzie Arena; Chattanooga, Tennessee
Dec 28, 1990*		vs. Towson State; Low Country Basketball Classic	W 71–52	5–3	Charleston, South Carolina
Dec 29, 1990*		vs. UNC Charlotte; Low Country Basketball Classic	W 93–67	6–3	Charleston, South Carolina
SEC Regular season
Jan 3, 1991		at Auburn	W 68–56	7–3 (1–0)	Memorial Coliseum; Auburn, Alabama
Jan 5, 1991		at Vanderbilt	L 55–56	7–4 (1–1)	Memorial Gymnasium; Nashville, Tennessee
Jan 9, 1991		Florida	W 72–64	8–4 (2–1)	Coleman Coliseum; Tuscaloosa, Alabama
Jan 12, 1991		at Ole Miss	W 76–73	9–4 (3–1)	Tad Smith Coliseum; Oxford, Mississippi
Jan 15, 1991		No. 20 LSU	L 80–90	9–5 (3–2)	Coleman Coliseum; Tuscaloosa, Alabama
Jan 19, 1991		Georgia	W 67–62	10–5 (4–2)	Coleman Coliseum; Tuscaloosa, Alabama
Jan 23, 1991		at Mississippi State	L 59–68	10–6 (4–3)	Humphrey Coliseum; Starkville, Mississippi
Jan 26, 1991		No. 8 Kentucky	W 88–83	11–6 (5–3)	Coleman Coliseum; Tuscaloosa, Alabama
Jan 31, 1991		at Tennessee	W 83–74	12–6 (6–3)	Thompson-Boling Arena; Knoxville, Tennessee
Feb 2, 1991		Auburn	W 88–80	13–6 (7–3)	Coleman Coliseum; Tuscaloosa, Alabama
Feb 6, 1991		Ole Miss	W 79–74	14–6 (8–3)	Coleman Coliseum; Tuscaloosa, Alabama
Feb 9, 1991		at Florida	W 88–80	15–6 (9–3)	O'Connell Center; Gainesville, Florida
Feb 13, 1991		Vanderbilt	W 66–55	16–6 (10–3)	Coleman Coliseum; Tuscaloosa, Alabama
Feb 17, 1991		at No. 20 LSU	L 81–88	16–7 (10–4)	Maravich Assembly Center; Baton Rouge, Louisiana
Feb 20, 1991		at Georgia	L 68–73	16–8 (10–5)	Stegeman Coliseum; Athens, Georgia
Feb 23, 1991		No. 21 Mississippi State	W 97–72	17–8 (11–5)	Coleman Coliseum; Tuscaloosa, Alabama
Feb 26, 1991	No. 24	at No. 13 Kentucky	L 73–79	17–9 (11–6)	Rupp Arena; Lexington, Kentucky
Mar 2, 1991	No. 24	Tennessee	W 96–88	18–9 (12–6)	Coleman Coliseum; Tuscaloosa, Alabama
SEC Tournament
Mar 8, 1991*	No. 24	vs. Florida; SEC Tournament Quarterfinal	W 71–65	19–9	Memorial Gymnasium; Nashville, Tennessee
Mar 9, 1991*	No. 24	vs. Auburn; SEC Tournament Semifinal	W 77–59	20–9	Memorial Gymnasium; Nashville, Tennessee
Mar 10, 1991*	No. 24	vs. Tennessee; SEC tournament championship	W 88–69	21–9	Memorial Gymnasium; Nashville, Tennessee
NCAA Tournament
Mar 15, 1991*	(4 SE) No. 19	vs. (13 SE) Murray State; First round	W 89–79	22–9	Omni Coliseum; Atlanta, Georgia
Mar 17, 1991*	(4 SE) No. 19	vs. (5 SE) Wake Forest; Second Round	W 96–88	23–9	Omni Coliseum; Atlanta, Georgia
Mar 21, 1991*	(4 SE) No. 19	vs. (1 SE) No. 2 Arkansas; Regional semifinal – Sweet Sixteen	L 70–93	23–10	Charlotte Coliseum; Charlotte, North Carolina
*Non-conference game. ^{#}Rankings from AP Poll. (#) Tournament seedings in parentheses. SE=Southeast.
