= 1990–91 Mississippi State Bulldogs men's basketball team =

American college basketball season

1990–91 Mississippi State Bulldogs men's basketball

SEC regular season co-champions

NCAA tournament, First Round
- Conference: Southeastern Conference

Ranking
- Coaches: No. 18
- AP: No. 21
- Record: 20–9 (13–5 SEC)
- Head coach: Richard Williams (5th season)
- Assistant coach: Rick Stansbury (1st season)
- Home arena: Humphrey Coliseum

1990–91 Southeastern Conference men's basketball standings
	Conf.				Overall
Team	W		L	PCT	W		L	PCT
No. 9 Kentucky	14	–	4	.778	22	–	6	.786
No. 21 Mississippi State	13	–	5	.722	20	–	9	.690
No. 22 LSU	13	–	5	.722	20	–	10	.667
No. 19 Alabama †	12	–	6	.667	23	–	10	.697
Vanderbilt	11	–	7	.611	17	–	13	.567
Georgia	9	–	9	.500	17	–	13	.567
Florida	7	–	11	.389	11	–	17	.393
Auburn	5	–	13	.278	13	–	16	.448
Ole Miss	3	–	15	.167	9	–	19	.321
Tennessee	3	–	15	.167	12	–	22	.353
† 1991 SEC tournament winner Rankings from AP poll

The 1990–91 Mississippi State Bulldogs men's basketball team represented Mississippi State University in the 1990–91 NCAA Division I men's basketball season. Led by head coach Richard Williams, the Bulldogs finished with a 20–9 record (13–5 SEC) and received an at-large bid to the NCAA tournament as No. 5 seed in the East region.

== Roster ==
1990–91 Mississippi State Bulldogs men's basketball team
Players	Coaches
Pos. / # / Name / Height / Weight / Year / Hometown; F / 21 / Cameron Burns / 6 ft 7 in (2.01 m) / 220 lb (100 kg) / Sr / Flora, Mississippi	Head coach: Richard Williams (Mississippi State); Assistant coach(es): Rick Stansbury (Campbellsville); Legend: (C) Team captain; (S) Suspended; (I) Ineligible; (W) Walk-on; Injured; Current redshirt

== Schedule and results ==
Date time, TV	Rank^{#}	Opponent^{#}	Result	Record	Site city, state
Non-conference regular season
Nov 26, 1990*		Tennessee Tech	W 109–76	1–0	Humphrey Coliseum; Starkville, Mississippi
Nov 30, 1990*		at Chattanooga	W 76–70	2–0	McKenzie Arena; Chattanooga, Tennessee
Dec 4, 1990*		at Jacksonville	W 79–65	3–0	Jacksonville Memorial Coliseum; Jacksonville, Florida
Dec 8, 1990*		Ball State	W 86–72	4–0	Humphrey Coliseum; Starkville, Mississippi
Dec 11, 1990*		Eastern Kentucky	W 94–67	5–0	Humphrey Coliseum; Starkville, Mississippi
Dec 18, 1990*		Alcorn State	W 120–65	6–0	Humphrey Coliseum; Starkville, Mississippi
Dec 22, 1990*		at Drake	W 82–80 ^{OT}	7–0	Veterans Memorial Auditorium; Des Moines, Iowa
Dec 27, 1990*		vs. No. 6 Ohio State; Palm Beach Classic	L 80–82	7–1	West Palm Beach, Florida
Dec 28, 1990*		vs. Miami (FL); Palm Beach Classic	L 67–74	7–2	West Palm Beach, Florida
SEC Regular Season
Jan 2, 1991		at Tennessee	W 70–65	8–2 (1–0)	Thompson-Boling Arena; Knoxville, Tennessee
Jan 6, 1991		Ole Miss	W 84–80	9–2 (2–0)	Humphrey Coliseum; Starkville, Mississippi
Jan 9, 1991		at No. 11 Kentucky	L 70–89	9–3 (2–1)	Rupp Arena; Lexington, Kentucky
Jan 12, 1991		Vanderbilt	W 85–62	10–3 (3–1)	Humphrey Coliseum; Starkville, Mississippi
Jan 16, 1991		Georgia	L 73–81	10–4 (3–2)	Humphrey Coliseum; Starkville, Mississippi
Jan 19, 1991		at Florida	L 82–85	10–5 (3–3)	Stephen C. O'Connell Center; Gainesville, Florida
Jan 23, 1991		Alabama	W 68–59	11–5 (4–3)	Humphrey Coliseum; Starkville, Mississippi
Jan 26, 1991		at Auburn	W 84–64	12–5 (5–3)	Beard-Eaves-Memorial Coliseum; Auburn, Alabama
Jan 30, 1991		at No. 14 LSU	W 82–79	13–5 (6–3)	Maravich Assembly Center; Baton Rouge, Louisiana
Feb 2, 1991		Tennessee	W 95–68	14–5 (7–3)	Humphrey Coliseum; Starkville, Mississippi
Feb 6, 1991		at Vanderbilt	L 70–91	14–6 (7–4)	Memorial Gymnasium; Nashville, Tennessee
Feb 9, 1991		No. 10 Kentucky	W 83–82	15–6 (8–4)	Humphrey Coliseum; Starkville, Mississippi
Feb 13, 1991	No. 23	at Ole Miss	W 84–77	16–6 (9–4)	Tad Smith Coliseum; Oxford, Mississippi
Feb 16, 1991	No. 23	Georgia	W 70–64	17–6 (10–4)	Humphrey Coliseum; Starkville, Mississippi
Feb 20, 1991	No. 21	Florida	W 81–67	18–6 (11–4)	Humphrey Coliseum; Starkville, Mississippi
Feb 23, 1991	No. 21	at Alabama	L 72–97	18–7 (11–5)	Coleman Coliseum; Tuscaloosa, Alabama
Feb 27, 1991	No. 23	Auburn	W 94–76	19–7 (12–5)	Humphrey Coliseum; Starkville, Mississippi
Mar 2, 1991	No. 23	No. 18 LSU	W 76–73	20–7 (13–5)	Humphrey Coliseum; Starkville, Mississippi
SEC Tournament
Mar 8, 1991*	No. 18	vs. Tennessee; SEC Tournament Quarterfinal	L 70–87	20–8	Memorial Gymnasium; Nashville, Tennessee
NCAA Tournament
Mar 15, 1991*	(5 E) No. 21	vs. (12 E) Eastern Michigan; First Round	L 56–76	20–9	Carrier Dome; Syracuse, New York
*Non-conference game. ^{#}Rankings from AP Poll. (#) Tournament seedings in parentheses. E=East.
