= 1990–91 Southern Miss Golden Eagles basketball team =

American college basketball season

1990–91 Southern Miss Golden Eagles basketball

Metro Conference Regular Season Champions

NCAA tournament
- Conference: Metro Conference (1975–1995)

Ranking
- AP: No. 25
- Record: 21–8 (10–4 Metro)
- Head coach: M. K. Turk
- Home arena: Reed Green Coliseum

1990–91 Metro Conference men's basketball standings
	Conf.				Overall
Team	W		L	PCT	W		L	PCT
No. 25 Southern Miss	10	–	4	.714	21	–	8	.724
Florida State †	9	–	5	.643	21	–	11	.656
Cincinnati	8	–	6	.571	18	–	12	.600
Tulane	7	–	7	.500	15	–	13	.536
Memphis	7	–	7	.500	17	–	15	.531
Virginia Tech	6	–	8	.429	13	–	16	.448
South Carolina	5	–	9	.357	20	–	13	.606
Louisville	4	–	10	.286	14	–	16	.467
† 1991 Metro Conference tournament winner Rankings from AP Poll

The 1990–91 Southern Miss Golden Eagles basketball team represented the University of Southern Mississippi during the 1990–91 NCAA Division I men's basketball season. The Golden Eagles, led by head coach M. K. Turk, played their home games at Reed Green Coliseum and were members of the Metro Conference. They finished the season 21–8, 10–4 in Metro play to win the conference regular season title. They lost in the quarterfinal round of the Metro tournament to Louisville. Southern Miss received an at-large bid to the 1991 NCAA basketball tournament where they lost in the opening round to NC State, 114–85.

== Roster ==
1990–91 Southern Miss Golden Eagles men's basketball team
Players
Coaches

Pos.	#	Name	Height	Weight	Year	Previous school	Hometown
G		Russell Johnson	6 ft 2 in (1.88 m)	210 lb (95 kg)	Sr
G	23	Darrin Chancellor	6 ft 5 in (1.96 m)	—	Sr
C	32	Daron Jenkins	6 ft 11 in (2.11 m)	220 lb (100 kg)	Sr
F	35	Clarence Weatherspoon	6 ft 6 in (1.98 m)	235 lb (107 kg)	Jr	Motley	Crawford, Mississippi
F	42	Joe Courtney	6 ft 9 in (2.06 m)	230 lb (104 kg)	RS Jr	Mississippi State	Jackson, Mississippi

Head coach

- M.K. Turk

Assistant coach(es)

Legend

- (C) Team captain
- (S) Suspended
- (I) Ineligible
- (W) Walk-on
- Injured
- Current redshirt

== Schedule and results ==
Date time, TV	Rank^{#}	Opponent^{#}	Result	Record	Site (attendance) city, state
Regular season
Nov 30, 1990*	No. 19	vs. No. 6 Alabama	W 84–82	1–0	Mississippi Coast Coliseum; Biloxi, Mississippi
Dec 3, 1990*	No. 15	Hawaii-Loa	W 105–71	2–0	Reed Green Coliseum; Hattiesburg, Mississippi
Dec 6, 1990*	No. 15	at Tennessee Tech	L 78–84	2–1	Eblen Center; Cookeville, Tennessee
Dec 15, 1990*	No. 22	Northeast Louisiana	W 84–72	3–1	Reed Green Coliseum; Hattiesburg, Mississippi
Dec 28, 1990*	No. 21	vs. Holy Cross	W 89–86	4–1	
Dec 29, 1990*	No. 21	vs. Wyoming	W 122–112	5–1	
Jan 5, 1991	No. 21	Florida State	W 84–72	6–1 (1–0)	Reed Green Coliseum; Hattiesburg, Mississippi
Jan 10, 1991	No. 19	at No. 21 South Carolina	W 64–58	7–1 (2–0)	Carolina Coliseum; Columbia, South Carolina
Jan 12, 1991	No. 19	at Virginia Tech	W 101–99	8–1 (3–0)	Cassell Coliseum; Blacksburg, Virginia
Jan 17, 1991	No. 18	Tulane	W 64–57	9–1 (4–0)	Reed Green Coliseum; Hattiesburg, Mississippi
Jan 19, 1991	No. 18	Memphis State	W 87–77	10–1 (5–0)	Reed Green Coliseum; Hattiesburg, Mississippi
Jan 21, 1991*	No. 18	Texas–Pan American	W 88–72	11–1	Reed Green Coliseum; Hattiesburg, Mississippi
Jan 24, 1991	No. 15	at Louisville	W 84–81	12–1 (6–0)	Freedom Hall; Louisville, Kentucky
Jan 26, 1991	No. 15	Cincinnati	L 69–76	12–2 (6–1)	Reed Green Coliseum; Hattiesburg, Mississippi
Jan 30, 1991*	No. 17	at Southwestern Louisiana	W 97–91	13–2	Cajundome; Lafayette, Louisiana
Feb 2, 1991	No. 17	Louisville	W 77–66	14–2 (7–1)	Reed Green Coliseum; Hattiesburg, Mississippi
Feb 4, 1991*	No. 12	at Appalachian State	W 98–74	15–2	Varsity Gymnasium; Boone, North Carolina
Feb 7, 1991	No. 12	Virginia Tech	W 91–79	16–2 (8–1)	Reed Green Coliseum; Hattiesburg, Mississippi
Feb 9, 1991	No. 12	at Memphis State	W 87–81	17–2 (9–1)	Mid-South Coliseum; Memphis, Tennessee
Feb 11, 1991*	No. 9	at McNeese State	W 81–62	18–2	Burton Coliseum; Lake Charles, Louisiana
Feb 14, 1991*	No. 9	South Alabama	L 85–92	18–3	Reed Green Coliseum; Hattiesburg, Mississippi
Feb 16, 1991	No. 9	South Carolina	W 62–58	19–3 (10–1)	Reed Green Coliseum; Hattiesburg, Mississippi
Feb 18, 1991*	No. 11	at Texas–Pan American	W 88–77	20–3	UTPA Fieldhouse; Edinburg, Texas
Feb 20, 1991	No. 11	at Cincinnati	L 72–86	20–4 (10–2)	Fifth Third Arena; Cincinnati, Ohio
Feb 26, 1991	No. 14	at Florida State	L 83–85	20–5 (10–3)	Donald L. Tucker Center; Tallahassee, Florida
Feb 28, 1991*	No. 14	Southeastern Louisiana	W 85–60	21–5	Reed Green Coliseum; Hattiesburg, Mississippi
Mar 2, 1991	No. 14	at Tulane	L 65–82	21–6 (10–4)	Avron B. Fogelman Arena; New Orleans, Louisiana
Metro tournament
Mar 7, 1991*	No. 22	vs. Louisville; Metro tournament Quarterfinal	L 76–83	21–7	Roanoke Civic Center; Roanoke, Virginia
1991 NCAA tournament
Mar 14, 1991*	(11 E) No. 25	vs. (6 E) NC State; First Round	L 85–114	21–8	Cole Fieldhouse; College Park, Maryland
*Non-conference game. ^{#}Rankings from AP poll. (#) Tournament seedings in parentheses. E=East. All times are in Central Time.

== Awards and honors ==
- Clarence Weatherspoon – Metro Conference Player of the Year (Second time)

== Rankings ==
Ranking movements Legend: ██ Increase in ranking ██ Decrease in ranking — = Not ranked
	Week																
Poll	Pre	1	2	3	4	5	6	7	8	9	10	11	12	13	14	15	Final
AP	24	19	15	22	20	21	21	19	18	15	17	12	9	11	14	22	25
Coaches	18	19	16	23	18	22	18	23	20	15	16	12	10	11	16	19	—
