= 1990–91 Auburn Tigers men's basketball team =

American college basketball season

1990–91 Auburn Tigers men's basketball
- Conference: Southeastern Conference
- Record: 13–16 (5–13 SEC)
- Head coach: Tommy Joe Eagles (2nd season)
- Captains: Zane Arnold; John Caylor
- Home arena: Joel H. Eaves Memorial Coliseum

1990–91 Southeastern Conference men's basketball standings
| | Conf. | | | | Overall |
| Team | W | | L | PCT | W | | L | PCT |
|---|---|---|---|---|---|---|---|---|
| No. 9 Kentucky | 14 | – | 4 | .778 | 22 | – | 6 | .786 |
| No. 21 Mississippi State | 13 | – | 5 | .722 | 20 | – | 9 | .690 |
| No. 22 LSU | 13 | – | 5 | .722 | 20 | – | 10 | .667 |
| No. 19 Alabama † | 12 | – | 6 | .667 | 23 | – | 10 | .697 |
| Vanderbilt | 11 | – | 7 | .611 | 17 | – | 13 | .567 |
| Georgia | 9 | – | 9 | .500 | 17 | – | 13 | .567 |
| Florida | 7 | – | 11 | .389 | 11 | – | 17 | .393 |
| Auburn | 5 | – | 13 | .278 | 13 | – | 16 | .448 |
| Ole Miss | 3 | – | 15 | .167 | 9 | – | 19 | .321 |
| Tennessee | 3 | – | 15 | .167 | 12 | – | 22 | .353 |
† 1991 SEC tournament winner Rankings from AP poll

The 1990–91 Auburn Tigers men's basketball team represented Auburn University in the 1990-91 college basketball season. The team's head coach was Tommy Joe Eagles, who was in his second season at Auburn. The team played their home games at Joel H. Eaves Memorial Coliseum in Auburn, Alabama. They finished the season 13–16, 5–13 in SEC play, good for seventh in the conference. They defeated LSU to advance to the second round of the SEC tournament where they lost to Alabama.

The team's newest key addition was freshman guard Wesley Person, younger brother of former Auburn and NBA star Chuck Person. Person attended high school in Brantley, Alabama like his brother. Person averaged 15.4 points per game, second on the team to Ronnie Battle.

== Roster ==
1990–91 Auburn Tigers men's basketball team
Players
Coaches

| Pos. | # | Name | Height | Weight | Year | Previous school | Hometown |
|---|---|---|---|---|---|---|---|
| F | 22 | John Caylor | 6 ft 6 in (1.98 m) | — | Jr | Morristown West High School | Talbott, Tennessee |
| G | 14 | Reggie Gallon | 5 ft 10 in (1.78 m) | — | So | Miami Edison High School | Miami, Florida |
| G | 11 | Wesley Person | 6 ft 4 in (1.93 m) | — | Fr | Brantley High School | Brantley, Alabama |
| G | 21 | Ronnie Battle | 6 ft 1 in (1.85 m) | — | So | Chavala High School | Pittsview, Alabama |
| G | 3 | Champ Wrencher | 6 ft 1 in (1.85 m) | — | So | Ramsey High School | Birmingham, Alabama |
| G | 15 | Larry Patrick | 6 ft 5 in (1.96 m) | — | Sr | Polk Community College | West Palm Beach, Florida |
| F | 44 | Chris Brandt | 6 ft 6 in (1.98 m) | — | Jr | Auburn High School | Auburn, Alabama |
| F | 31 | Richard Smith | 6 ft 6 in (1.98 m) | — | Sr | Pratt Community College | Chicago, Florida |
| F | 40 | Zane Arnold | 6 ft 6 in (1.98 m) | — | Sr | Parker High School | Birmingham, Alabama |
| G | 21 | Cameron Boozer | 6 ft 7 in (2.01 m) | — | Fr | Lanett High School | Lanett, Alabama |
| G | 34 | Robert McKie | 6 ft 5 in (1.96 m) | — | So | Miami Carol City | Miami, Florida |
| G | 45 | Chuck Simms | 6 ft 6 in (1.98 m) | — | Fr | Redan High School | Decatur, Georgia |

Head coach

- Tommy Joe Eagles

Assistant coach(es)

Legend

- (C) Team captain
- (S) Suspended
- (I) Ineligible
- (W) Walk-on
- Injured
- Current redshirt
