= 1991 SEC men's basketball tournament =

Sports tournament

- Classification: Division I
- Season: 1990–91
- Teams: 9
- Site: Memorial Gymnasium; Nashville, Tennessee
- Champions: Alabama (6th title)
- Winning coach: Wimp Sanderson (4th title)
- MVP: Allan Houston (Tennessee)
- Attendance: 121,851
- Television: Jefferson Pilot Sports; ABC (Championship game only)

1990–91 Southeastern Conference men's basketball standings
| | Conf. | | | | Overall |
| Team | W | | L | PCT | W | | L | PCT |
|---|---|---|---|---|---|---|---|---|
| No. 9 Kentucky | 14 | – | 4 | .778 | 22 | – | 6 | .786 |
| No. 21 Mississippi State | 13 | – | 5 | .722 | 20 | – | 9 | .690 |
| No. 22 LSU | 13 | – | 5 | .722 | 20 | – | 10 | .667 |
| No. 19 Alabama † | 12 | – | 6 | .667 | 23 | – | 10 | .697 |
| Vanderbilt | 11 | – | 7 | .611 | 17 | – | 13 | .567 |
| Georgia | 9 | – | 9 | .500 | 17 | – | 13 | .567 |
| Florida | 7 | – | 11 | .389 | 11 | – | 17 | .393 |
| Auburn | 5 | – | 13 | .278 | 13 | – | 16 | .448 |
| Ole Miss | 3 | – | 15 | .167 | 9 | – | 19 | .321 |
| Tennessee | 3 | – | 15 | .167 | 12 | – | 22 | .353 |
† 1991 SEC tournament winner Rankings from AP poll

The 1991 SEC Men’s Basketball Tournament took place from March 7–10, 1991 at the Memorial Gymnasium on Vanderbilt University’s campus located in Nashville, Tennessee. The Alabama Crimson Tide won the tournament and received the SEC’s automatic bid to the 1991 NCAA Men’s Division I Basketball Tournament by defeating the Tennessee Volunteers by a score of 88–69.

Television coverage of the first round, the quarterfinals, and semifinals were regionally syndicated by Jefferson Pilot Sports, and the championship game was nationally televised on ABC.

Note: The Kentucky Wildcats men's basketball team was not qualified to participate in either the SEC or NCAA tournaments of both 1990 and 1991 due to NCAA probation.

== Bracket ==
First round
8 | Mississippi | 85
9 | Tennessee | 94

Second Round
1 | #18 Mississippi State | 70
9 | Tennessee | 87
4 | Vanderbilt | 72
5 | Georgia | 80
3 | #24 Alabama | 71
6 | Florida | 65
2 | #16 LSU | 77
7 | Auburn | 92

Semifinals
9 | Tennessee | 85
5 | Georgia | 65
3 | #24 Alabama | 77
7 | Auburn | 59

Championship Game
9 | Tennessee | 69
3 | #24 Alabama | 88
