= 1991 Sun Belt Conference men's basketball tournament =

- Classification: Division I
- Season: 1990–91
- Teams: 8
- Site: Mobile Civic Center; Mobile, AL
- Champions: South Alabama (2nd title)
- Winning coach: Ronnie Arrow (2nd title)
- MVP: Chris Gatling (Old Dominion)

1990–91 Sun Belt Conference men's basketball standings
| | Conf. | | | | Overall |
| Team | W | | L | PCT | W | | L | PCT |
|---|---|---|---|---|---|---|---|---|
| South Alabama † | 11 | – | 3 | .786 | 22 | – | 9 | .710 |
| UAB | 9 | – | 5 | .643 | 18 | – | 13 | .581 |
| South Florida | 8 | – | 6 | .571 | 19 | – | 11 | .633 |
| Western Kentucky | 8 | – | 6 | .571 | 14 | – | 14 | .500 |
| VCU | 7 | – | 7 | .500 | 14 | – | 17 | .452 |
| Old Dominion | 5 | – | 9 | .357 | 14 | – | 18 | .438 |
| UNC Charlotte | 6 | – | 8 | .429 | 14 | – | 14 | .500 |
| Jacksonville | 2 | – | 12 | .143 | 6 | – | 22 | .214 |
† 1991 Sun Belt Conference tournament winner Rankings from AP Poll

The 1991 Sun Belt Conference men's basketball tournament was held March 2–4 at the Mobile Civic Center in Mobile, Alabama.

Top-seeded hosts South Alabama defeated Old Dominion in the championship game, 86–81, to win their second Sun Belt men's basketball tournament. It was the Jaguars' second Sun Belt title in three years.

South Alabama, in turn, received an automatic bid to the 1991 NCAA tournament. No other Sun Belt members joined them in the tournament.

== Format ==
There were no changes to the existing tournament format. All eight conference members were placed into the initial quarterfinal round and each team was seeded based on its regular season conference record.

== Bracket ==
Quarterfinals; Saturday, March 2
1 | South Alabama | 84
8 | Jacksonville | 68
5 | VCU | 100
4 | Western Kentucky | 89
3 | UAB | 88
6 | Old Dominion | 94
7 | UNC Charlotte | 68
2 | South Florida | 73

Semifinals; Sunday, March 3
1 | South Alabama | 105
5 | VCU | 78
6 | Old Dominion | 72
2 | South Florida | 69

Championship; Monday, March 4
1 | South Alabama | 86
6 | Old Dominion | 81

== See also ==
- Sun Belt Conference women's basketball tournament
