= 1991 Metro Conference men's basketball tournament =

- Classification: Division I
- Season: 1990–91
- Teams: 8
- Site: Roanoke Civic Center; Roanoke, VA
- Champions: Florida State (1st title)
- Winning coach: Pat Kennedy (1st title)
- MVP: LaBradford Smith (Louisville)

1990–91 Metro Conference men's basketball standings
	Conf.				Overall
Team	W		L	PCT	W		L	PCT
No. 25 Southern Miss	10	–	4	.714	21	–	8	.724
Florida State †	9	–	5	.643	21	–	11	.656
Cincinnati	8	–	6	.571	18	–	12	.600
Tulane	7	–	7	.500	15	–	13	.536
Memphis	7	–	7	.500	17	–	15	.531
Virginia Tech	6	–	8	.429	13	–	16	.448
South Carolina	5	–	9	.357	20	–	13	.606
Louisville	4	–	10	.286	14	–	16	.467
† 1991 Metro Conference tournament winner Rankings from AP Poll

The 1991 Metro Conference men's basketball tournament was held March 7–9 at the Roanoke Civic Center in Roanoke, Virginia.

Florida State defeated Louisville in the championship game, 76–69, to win their first Metro men's basketball tournament.

The Seminoles received the conference's automatic bid to the 1991 NCAA Tournament. Additionally, Southern Miss, the regular season conference champions, received an at-large bid.

== Format ==
All eight members of the conference participated. Teams were seeded based on regular season conference records.

== Bracket ==
Quarterfinal; Thursday, March 7
1	Southern Miss	76
8	Louisville	83
4	Memphis State	84
5	Tulane	77
3	Cincinnati	69
6	Virginia Tech	75
7	South Carolina	55
2	Florida State	65

Semifinals; Friday, March 8
8	Louisville	72
4	Memphis State	70
6	Virginia Tech	71
2	Florida State	91

Championship; Saturday, March 9
8	Louisville	69
2	Florida State	76
