= Bernadette Mattox =

American basketball coach

Bernadette Locke-Mattox (born December 31, 1958) is a former head coach of the University of Kentucky women's basketball team. While at Kentucky in 1990, she became the first female to serve as assistant coach for a men's NCAA Division I basketball team, when she served under Rick Pitino. She formerly served as an assistant coach with the Connecticut Sun of the WNBA. She formerly played basketball at Roane State Community College.

== Coaching career ==
Bernadette Mattox
Medal record

Women's basketball

Assistant coach for United States

FIBA World Championship for Women
Gold medal – first place	1998 Berlin, Germany	Team competition

- 1990–1994 Assistant coach - University of Kentucky men's basketball under Rick Pitino
- 1995–2003 Head coach - University of Kentucky women's basketball
- 2003–2012 Assistant coach - Connecticut Sun WNBA

== USA Basketball ==
In 1998, Mattox was named an assistant coach of the USA National Team, under head coach Nell Fortner. The USA team competed in the World Championships held in three cities in Germany, including Berlin, Germany. The USA team won all six of the preliminary round games, with most games in double-digit margins. The one exception was the opening round game against Japan, which the USA team won 95–89. In the quarterfinals, the USA team beat Slovakia 89–62. In the semifinal match-up against Brazil, the USA team was behind by ten points in the first half, but came back and won by 14 points. The championship game was a rematch against Russia, a team the USA had defeated by 36 points in the preliminary round. However, the gold medal game would unfold very differently. The USA team was behind most of the game, with a nine-point deficit at halftime. When there were under two minutes to play, the USA was still behind, but Ruthie Bolton hit a three-pointer to give the USA team a one-point lead. After the Russians tied the game, Bolton hit another three to give the USA team a lead they would not relinquish. The USA team won 71–65 to win the gold medal.

== Personal life ==
The former Bernadette Locke is married to Vince Mattox. They reside in Lexington, Kentucky with their son Vincent, who now attends Murray State University in Kentucky. She and her twin sister Juliette are 1977 graduates of Loudon High School in Loudon, Tennessee.

== Head coaching record ==
Record table
Season	Team	Overall	Conference	Standing	Postseason
Kentucky Lady Wildcats basketball (Southeastern Conference) (1995–2002)
1995–96	Kentucky	8-19	2-9	12th	
1996–97	Kentucky	8-19	2-10	10th	
1997–98	Kentucky	13-15	5-9	8th	
1998–99	Kentucky	21-11	7-7	7th	NCAA Second Round (#6 seed)
1999–00	Kentucky	15-14	5-9	9th	
2000–01	Kentucky	6-21	2-12	12th	
2001–02	Kentucky	9-20	1-13	12th	
2002–03	Kentucky	11-16	4-10	9th	
Kentucky:		91-135	28-79		
Total:		91-135			
National champion Postseason invitational champion Conference regular season champion Conference regular season and conference tournament champion Division regular season champion Division regular season and conference tournament champion Conference tournament champion

Sources: SEC records;
