= 1990–91 NCAA Division I men's basketball rankings =

- Season: 1990–91
- NCAA Tournament: 1991
- Preseason No. 1: UNLV
- NCAA Tournament Champions: Duke
NCAA Division I men's basketball rankings


The 1990–91 NCAA Division I men's basketball rankings was made up of two human polls, the AP Poll and the Coaches Poll, in addition to various other preseason polls.

== Legend ==
	Increase in ranking
	Decrease in ranking
	New to rankings from previous week
Italics	Number of first place votes
(#–#)	Win–loss record
т	Tied with team above or below also with this symbol

== AP Poll ==
	Preseason	Week 2 Nov. 26	Week 3 Dec. 3	Week 4 Dec. 10	Week 5 Dec. 17	Week 6 Dec. 24	Week 7 Dec. 31	Week 8 Jan. 7	Week 9 Jan. 14	Week 10 Jan. 21	Week 11 Jan. 28	Week 12 Feb. 4	Week 13 Feb. 11	Week 14 Feb. 18	Week 15 Feb. 25	Week 16 Mar. 4	Final Mar. 11	
1.	UNLV	UNLV (0–0)	UNLV (1–0)	UNLV (2–0)	UNLV (3–0)	UNLV (5–0)	UNLV (6–0)	UNLV (8–0)	UNLV (11–0)	UNLV (13–0)	UNLV (15–0)	UNLV (18–0)	UNLV (20–0)	UNLV (22–0)	UNLV (25–0)	UNLV (27–0)	UNLV (30–0)	1.
2.	Arkansas	Arizona (5–0)	Arizona (6–0)	Arkansas (7–1)	Arkansas (8–1)	Arkansas (9–1)	Arkansas (10–1)	Arkansas (13–1)	Arkansas (15–1)	Arkansas (17–1)	Arkansas (20–1)	Arkansas (22–1)	Ohio State (19–1)	Ohio State (22–1)	Ohio State (24–1)	Ohio State (25–1)	Arkansas (31–3)	2.
3.	Arizona	Arkansas (3–1)	Arkansas (5–1)	Syracuse (7–0)	Syracuse (9–0)	Syracuse (11–0)	Syracuse (12–0)	Indiana (14–1)	Indiana (14–1)	Indiana (16–1)	Ohio State (17–0)	Ohio State (18–1)	Arkansas (22–2)	Arkansas (25–2)	Arkansas (27–2)	Indiana (25–4)	Indiana (27–4)	3.
4.	Michigan State	North Carolina (1–0)	Syracuse (4–0)	Arizona (7–1)	Arizona (7–1)	Arizona (8–1)	Arizona (10–1)	Ohio State (12–0)	Ohio State (14–0)	Ohio State (15–0)	Indiana (18–2)	Indiana (20–2)	Indiana (22–2)	Indiana (22–3)	North Carolina (20–4)	Syracuse (26–4)	North Carolina (25–5)	4.
5.	North Carolina	Michigan State (1–0)	Duke (5–1)	Georgetown (5–0)	UCLA (7–0)	Indiana (10–1)	Indiana (12–1)	North Carolina (11–1)	North Carolina (13–1)	Arizona (15–2)	St. John's (15–2)	Arizona (18–3)	Duke (21–4)	Syracuse (22–3)	Indiana (23–4)	Arkansas (28–3)	Ohio State (25–3)	5.
6.	Duke	Alabama (1–0)	Georgetown (3–0)	UCLA (6–0)	Indiana (8–1)	Ohio State (8–0)	Ohio State (10–0)	Arizona (11–2)	Arizona (13–2)	Syracuse (16–2)	Arizona (16–3)	Duke (18–4)	Arizona (19–4)	North Carolina (19–4)	Syracuse (24–4)	Duke (25–6)	Duke (26–7)	6.
7.	Alabama	Syracuse (3–0)	Indiana (4–1)	Indiana (7–1)	Ohio State (6–0)	North Carolina (7–1)	North Carolina (9–1)	UCLA (12–1)	UCLA (13–2)	North Carolina (13–2)	Duke (16–4)	Syracuse (19–3)	Syracuse (20–3)	Duke (22–5)	Arizona (22–5)	North Carolina (22–5)	Syracuse (26–5)	7.
8.	Indiana	Duke (3–1)	UCLA (4–0)	Ohio State (4–0)	North Carolina (6–1)	Duke (8–2)	Duke (9–2)	Syracuse (13–1)	Syracuse (14–2)	Kentucky (14–2)	Syracuse (17–3)	St. John's (16–3)	North Carolina (17–4)	Kansas (19–4)	Duke (23–6)	Utah (26–2)	Arizona (26–6)	8.
9.	Georgetown	Georgetown (2–0)	Ohio State (3–0)	North Carolina (4–1)	Duke (6–2)	St. John's (9–0)	St. John's (9–0)	Connecticut (10–1)	Kentucky (12–2)	Duke (15–3)	North Carolina (14–3)	North Carolina (15–3)	Southern Miss (17–2)	Arizona (20–5)	Utah (25–2)	Arizona (24–6)	Kentucky (22–6)	9.
10.	Ohio State	Indiana (2–1)	North Carolina (3–1)	Duke (6–2)	LSU (4–1)	UCLA (8–1)	UCLA (10–1)	St. John's (10–1)	St. John's (11–2)	St. John's (13–2)	Kentucky (15–3)	Kentucky (17–3)	East Tennessee State (21–2)	Utah (24–2)	Kansas (20–5)	Kentucky (22–6)	Utah (28–3)	10.
11.	UCLA	Ohio State (1–0)	Pittsburgh (4–0)	Georgia (5–0)	Oklahoma (8–1)	Pittsburgh (9–1)	Pittsburgh (11–2)	Kentucky (10–2)	Oklahoma (13–2)	UCLA (14–3)	Nebraska (17–2)	Virginia (16–4)	Kansas (17–4)	Southern Miss (19–3)	New Mexico State (21–3)	New Mexico State (23–4)	Nebraska (26–7)	11.
12.	Pittsburgh	UCLA (3–0)	Alabama (2–1)	LSU (4–1)	Georgetown (6–1)	South Carolina (8–1)	Connecticut (8–1)	Oklahoma (11–2)	Duke (12–3)	East Tennessee State (14–1)	UCLA (15–4)	Southern Miss (14–2)	New Mexico State (17–2)	Kentucky (19–5)	Oklahoma State (20–5)	Kansas (21–6)	Kansas (22–7)	12.
13.	Syracuse	Pittsburgh (2–0)	Georgia (4–0)	Oklahoma (6–1)	St. John's (8–0)	Connecticut (6–1)	Oklahoma (10–2)	Virginia (9–2)	Connecticut (12–2)	Oklahoma (14–3)	Utah (19–1)	East Tennessee State (18–2)	St. John's (16–5)	East Tennessee State (23–3)	Kentucky (20–6)	Nebraska (24–6)	Seton Hall (22–8)	13.
14.	LSU	Georgia Tech (1–0)	Connecticut (3–0)	St. John's (6–0)	Pittsburgh (7–1)	Oklahoma (8–2)	LSU (7–2)	Duke (10–3)	Virginia (10–3)	Nebraska (16–2)	LSU (13–4)	UCLA (16–5)	Utah (22–2)	Nebraska (21–4)	Southern Miss (20–4)	Oklahoma State (21–6)	Oklahoma State (22–7)	14.
15.	Oklahoma	Connecticut (1–0)	Southern Miss (1–0)	Pittsburgh (6–1)	Connecticut (5–1)	LSU (6–2)	Georgetown (7–2)	Georgetown (9–2)	East Tennessee State (12–2)	Southern Miss (10–1)	Virginia (14–4)	Nebraska (18–3)	UCLA (17–6)	New Mexico State (19–3)	Nebraska (23–5)	East Tennessee State (28–4)	New Mexico State (23–5)	15.
16.	Georgia Tech	Virginia (2–1)	Oklahoma (4–1)	Connecticut (3–1)	South Carolina (7–1)	Georgetown (6–2)	Kentucky (8–2)	East Tennessee State (10–1)	Pittsburgh (14–3)	LSU (12–3)	East Tennessee State (15–2)	New Mexico State (16–2)	Kentucky (17–5)	Oklahoma State (18–5)	UCLA (20–7)	LSU (20–8)	UCLA (23–8)	16.
17.	Connecticut	Georgia (2–0)	St. John's (3–0)	South Carolina (5–1)	Georgia (6–1)	Georgia (7–2)	East Tennessee State (9–1)	Pittsburgh (12–3)	Nebraska (16–1)	Pittsburgh (14–4)	Southern Miss (12–2)	Utah (20–2)	Nebraska (19–4)	UCLA (18–7)	St. John's (19–6)	UCLA (21–8)	East Tennessee State (28–4)	17.
18.	Virginia	Oklahoma (2–1)	LSU (2–1)	Kentucky (4–0)	Kentucky (5–1)	Kentucky (6–2)	Virginia (7–2)	Nebraska (14–1)	Southern Miss (8–1)	Virginia (11–4)	Georgetown (12–5)	Kansas (15–4)	Georgetown (15–6)	St. John's (17–6)	LSU (19–7)	Mississippi State (20–7)	Princeton (24–2)	18.
19.	Temple	Southern Miss (0–0)	Michigan State (1–2)	Virginia (5–2)	Virginia (5–2)	Virginia (6–2)	Nebraska (12–1)	Southern Miss (6–1)	Georgetown (10–3)	Connecticut (12–4)	Pittsburgh (15–5)	LSU (13–6)	Virginia (17–7)	LSU (17–7)	East Tennessee State (24–4)	Princeton (23–2)	Alabama (21–9)	19.
20.	Missouri	LSU (1–1)	Georgia Tech (2–1)	Alabama (2–2)	Southern Miss (3–1)	East Tennessee State (8–1)	South Carolina (9–2)	LSU (8–3)	LSU (10–3)	Utah (17–1)	New Mexico State (15–2)	Georgetown (13–6)	LSU (15–7)	Virginia (19–7)	Seton Hall (18–7)	St. John's (20–7)	St. John's (20–8)	20.
21.	Georgia	St. John's (2–0)	South Carolina (4–1) т	Michigan State (2–2)	East Tennessee State (7–1)	Southern Miss (3–1)	Southern Miss (5–1)	South Carolina (10–2)	New Mexico State (11–1)	Georgetown (11–4)	Oklahoma (14–5)	New Orleans (19–3)	Oklahoma State (16–5)	Mississippi State (17–6)	Princeton (20–2)	Seton Hall (19–8)	Mississippi State (20–8)	21.
22.	Texas	Texas (0–0)	Virginia (3–2) т	Southern Miss (2–1)	Nebraska (9–1)	Nebraska (10–1)	Iowa (11–1)	Iowa (12–2)	South Carolina (13–3)	Michigan State (12–4)	New Orleans (15–2)	Oklahoma State (15–4)	Pittsburgh (17–7)	Pittsburgh (18–8)	Pittsburgh (19–9)	Southern Miss (21–6)	LSU (20–9)	22.
23.	Louisville	Missouri (0–0)	Texas (1–1)	Georgia Tech (3–2)	Texas (3–2)	Iowa (9–1)	New Mexico State (8–1)	New Mexico State (9–1)	Utah (15–1)	New Mexico State (12–2)	Georgia Tech (12–5)	Oklahoma (15–6)	Mississippi State (15–6)	Princeton (18–2)	Mississippi State (18–7)	Texas (20–7)	Texas (22–8)	23.
24.	Southern Miss	Villanova (2–0)	Temple (1–1)	East Tennessee State (6–1)	Michigan State (3–3)	New Mexico State (7–1)	Georgia Tech (7–3)	Georgia Tech (9–3)	Iowa (13–3)	New Orleans (15–2)	Kansas (13–4)	Pittsburgh (15–7)	Texas (16–5)	Seton Hall (16–7)	Alabama (17–8)	Alabama (18–9)	DePaul (20–8)	24.
25.	St. John's	Louisville (0–0)	Kentucky (3–0)	Texas (3–2)	Princeton (7–0)	Michigan State (5–3)	Michigan State (7–3)	UTEP (10–2)	Seton Hall (10–3)	South Carolina (13–4)	Seton Hall (13–4)	Michigan State (13–6)	Princeton (16–2)	Georgetown (15–8)	Virginia (19–9)	DePaul (18–8)	Southern Miss (21–7)	25.
	Preseason	Week 2 Nov. 26	Week 3 Dec. 3	Week 4 Dec. 10	Week 5 Dec. 17	Week 6 Dec. 24	Week 7 Dec. 31	Week 8 Jan. 7	Week 9 Jan. 14	Week 10 Jan. 21	Week 11 Jan. 28	Week 12 Feb. 4	Week 13 Feb. 11	Week 14 Feb. 18	Week 15 Feb. 25	Week 16 Mar. 4	Final Mar. 11	
		Dropped: Temple (0–1)	Dropped: Missouri (2–1); Villanova (2–1); Louisville (0–1)	Dropped: Temple (2–2)	Dropped: Alabama (2–3); Georgia Tech (4–3)	Dropped: Texas (4–3); Princeton (8–1)	Dropped: Georgia (7–3)	Dropped: Michigan State (8–4)	None	Dropped: Iowa (13–5)	Dropped: Connecticut (12–6)	Dropped: Seton Hall (13–6)	Dropped: New Orleans (19–5); Oklahoma (15–8); Michigan State (13–6)	Dropped: Texas (17–6)	Dropped: Georgetown (16–9)	Dropped: Pittsburgh (20–10); Virginia (20–10)	None	

== Coaches Poll ==
The Coaches poll expanded to 25 teams beginning with the 1990–91 season.

	Preseason	Week 2 Nov. 27	Week 3 Dec. 4	Week 4 Dec. 11	Week 5 Dec. 18	Week 6 Dec. 25	Week 7 Jan. 1	Week 8 Jan. 8	Week 9 Jan. 15	Week 10 Jan. 22	Week 11 Jan. 29	Week 12 Feb. 5	Week 13 Feb. 12	Week 14 Feb. 19	Week 15 Feb. 26	Week 16 Mar. 5	Final Mar. 12	
1.	UNLV	Arizona (5–0)	UNLV (1–0)	UNLV (2–0)	UNLV (3–0)	UNLV (5–0)	UNLV (6–0)	UNLV (8–0)	UNLV (11–0)	UNLV (13–0)	UNLV (15–0)	UNLV (18–0)	UNLV (20–0)	UNLV (22–0)	UNLV (25–0)	UNLV (27–0)	UNLV (30–0)	1.
2.	Arizona	UNLV (0–0)	Arizona (6–0)	Arkansas (7–1)	Arkansas (8–1)	Arkansas (9–1)	Arkansas (10–1)	Arkansas (13–1)	Arkansas (15–1)	Arkansas (17–1)	Arkansas (20–1)	Arkansas (22–1)	Ohio State (19–1)	Ohio State (22–1)	Ohio State (24–1)	Ohio State (25–1)	Arkansas (31–3)	2.
3.	Arkansas	Arkansas (3–1)	Arkansas (5–1)	Syracuse (7–0)	Syracuse (9–0)	Arizona (8–1)	Arizona (10–1)	Indiana (14–1)	Ohio State (14–0)	Indiana (16–1)	Ohio State (17–0)	Ohio State (18–1)	Arkansas (22–2)	Arkansas (25–2)	Arkansas (27–2)	Indiana (25–4)	Indiana (27–4)	3.
4.	North Carolina	North Carolina (1–0)	Syracuse (4–0)	Georgetown (5–0)	Arizona (7–1)	Syracuse (11–0)	Syracuse (12–0)	Ohio State (12–0)	Indiana (14–1)	Ohio State (15–0)	Indiana (18–2)	Indiana (20–2)	Indiana (22–2)	Indiana (22–3)	North Carolina (20–4)	Syracuse (26–4)	North Carolina (25–5)	4.
5.	Michigan State	Michigan State (1–0)	Duke (5–1)	Arizona (7–1)	UCLA (7–0)	Indiana (10–1)	Indiana (12–1)	North Carolina (11–1)	North Carolina (13–1)	Arizona (15–2)	St. John's (15–2)	Arizona (18–3)	Duke (21–4)	Syracuse (22–3)	Arizona (22–5)	Duke (25–6)	Ohio State (25–3)	5.
6.	Duke	Georgetown (2–0)	Georgetown (3–0)	UCLA (6–0)	Indiana (8–1)	Ohio State (8–0)	Ohio State (10–0)	Arizona (11–2)	Arizona (13–2)	Duke (15–3)	Arizona (16–3)	Duke (18–4)	Arizona (19–4)	North Carolina (19–4)	Syracuse (24–4)	Arkansas (28–3)	Duke (26–7)	6.
7.	Georgetown	Syracuse (3–0)	Indiana (4–1) т	Ohio State (4–0)	Ohio State (6–0)	North Carolina (7–1)	North Carolina (9–1)	UCLA (12–1)	UCLA (13–2)	Syracuse (16–2)	Duke (16–4)	St. John's (16–3)	Syracuse (20–3)	Duke (22–5)	Indiana (23–4)	Arizona (24–6)	Arizona (26–6)	7.
8.	Indiana	Alabama (1–0)	UCLA (4–0) т	Duke (6–2)	North Carolina (6–1)	Duke (8–2)	Duke (9–2)	Syracuse (13–1)	Syracuse (14–2)	North Carolina (13–2)	Syracuse (17–3)	Syracuse (19–3)	North Carolina (17–4)	Arizona (20–5)	Duke (23–6)	North Carolina (22–5)	Syracuse (26–5)	8.
9.	Alabama	Duke (3–1)	Ohio State (3–0)	Indiana (7–1)	Duke (6–2)	UCLA (8–1)	UCLA (10–1)	Connecticut (10–1)	Duke (12–3)	St. John's (13–2)	North Carolina (14–3)	North Carolina (15–3)	East Tennessee State (21–2)	Kansas (19–4)	Kansas (20–5)	Utah (26–2)	Nebraska (26–7)	9.
10.	UCLA	UCLA (3–0)	North Carolina (3–1)	North Carolina (4–1)	Georgetown (6–1)	St. John's (9–0)	St. John's (9–0)	St. John's (10–1)	St. John's (11–2)	UCLA (14–3)	Kentucky (15–3)	East Tennessee State (19–2)	Southern Miss (17–2)	Utah (24–2)	Utah (25–2)	Kansas (21–6)	Utah (28–3)	10.
11.	Ohio State	Indiana (2–1)	Connecticut (3–0)	LSU (4–1)	LSU (4–1)	Pittsburgh (9–1)	Oklahoma (10–2)	Duke (10–3)	Oklahoma (13–2)	Oklahoma (14–3)	Nebraska (17–2)	UCLA (16–5)	Kansas (17–4)	Southern Miss (19–3)	New Mexico State (21–3)	New Mexico State (23–4)	Seton Hall (22–8)	11.
12.	Oklahoma	Ohio State (1–0)	Georgia (4–0)	Georgia (5–0)	Oklahoma (8–1)	South Carolina (8–1)	LSU (7–2)	Oklahoma (11–2)	Connecticut (12–2)	Nebraska (16–2)	East Tennessee State (15–2)	Southern Miss (14–2)	St. John's (16–5)	East Tennessee State (23–3)	Oklahoma State (20–5)	East Tennessee State (28–4)	Kansas (22–7)	12.
13.	LSU	Connecticut (1–0)	Pittsburgh (4–0) т	Pittsburgh (6–1)	Georgia (6–1)	LSU (6–2)	Connecticut (8–1)	Georgetown (9–2)	Nebraska (16–1)	East Tennessee State (14–1)	UCLA (15–4)	Virginia (16–4)	Utah (22–2)	Nebraska (21–4)	Nebraska (23–5)	Nebraska (24–6)	Oklahoma State (22–7)	13.
14.	Connecticut	Pittsburgh (2–0) т	Oklahoma (4–1) т	Oklahoma (6–1)	St. John's (8–0)	Oklahoma (8–2)	Pittsburgh (11–2)	Nebraska (14–1)	Pittsburgh (14–3)	LSU (12–3)	LSU (13–4)	Nebraska (18–3)	UCLA (17–6)	New Mexico State (19–3)	St. John's (19–6)	Oklahoma State (21–6)	UCLA (23–8)	14.
15.	Pittsburgh	Georgia Tech (1–0) т	Alabama (2–1)	St. John's (6–0)	Connecticut (5–1)	Connecticut (6–1)	Nebraska (12–1)	Virginia (9–2)	Virginia (10–3)	Southern Miss (10–1)	Utah (19–1)	Utah (20–2)	New Mexico State (17–2)	Oklahoma State (18–5)	UCLA (20–7)	UCLA (21–8)	East Tennessee State (28–4)	15.
16.	Syracuse	Georgia (2–0) т	Southern Miss (1–0)	Connecticut (3–1)	Pittsburgh (7–1)	Georgetown (6–2)	Georgetown (7–2)	Pittsburgh (12–3)	East Tennessee State (12–2)	Pittsburgh (14–4)	Southern Miss (12–2)	New Mexico State (16–2)	Nebraska (19–4)	St. John's (17–6)	Southern Miss (20–4)	Mississippi State (20–7)	Alabama (21–9)	16.
17.	Georgia Tech	Oklahoma (2–1) т	LSU (2–1)	South Carolina (5–1)	South Carolina (7–1)	Georgia (7–2)	East Tennessee (9–1)	East Tennessee State (10–1)	LSU (10–3)	Utah (17–1)	Pittsburgh (15–5)	Kansas (15–4)	Georgetown (15–6)	UCLA (18–7)	LSU (19–7)	St. John's (20–7)	New Mexico State (23–5)	17.
18.	Southern Miss	Virginia (2–1)	St. John's (3–0)	Kentucky (4–0)	Southern Miss (3–1)	Michigan State (5–3)	Southern Miss (5–1)	New Mexico State (9–1)	Georgetown (10–3)	Michigan State (12–4)	Virginia (14–4)	New Orleans (19–3)	Virginia (17–7)	LSU (17–7)	East Tennessee State (24–4)	LSU (20–8)	Mississippi State (20–8)	18.
19.	Virginia	Southern Miss (0–0) т	Michigan State (1–2)	Georgia Tech (3–2)	East Tennessee State (7–1)	East Tennessee State (8–1) т	Iowa (11–1)	LSU (8–3)	New Mexico State (11–1)	Connecticut (12–4)	New Mexico State (15–2)	Georgetown (13–6)	Oklahoma State (16–5)	Virginia (19–7)	Princeton (20–2)	Southern Miss (21–6)	St. John's (20–8)	19.
20.	Kansas	Texas (0–0) т	Georgia Tech (2–1)	Michigan State (2–2)	New Mexico State (6–1)	Nebraska (10–1) т	New Mexico State (8–1)	Iowa (12–2)	Southern Miss (8–1)	Georgetown (11–4)	Georgetown (12–5)	Oklahoma State (15–4)	Alabama (15–6)	Princeton (18–2)	Alabama (17–8)	DePaul (18–8)	Princeton (24–2)	20.
21.	Texas	Missouri (0–0) т	New Mexico State (4–0)	Alabama (2–2)	Nebraska (9–1)	Iowa (9–1)	Michigan State (7–3)	South Carolina (10–2)	Seton Hall (10–3)	Virginia (11–4)	Oklahoma (14–5)	Alabama (13–6)	Texas (16–5)	Mississippi State (17–6)	Georgia Tech (16–7)	Alabama (18–9)	LSU (20–9)	21.
22.	Louisville	Louisville (0–0)	South Carolina (4–1)	Virginia (5–2)	Princeton (7–0)	Southern Miss (3–1) т	Virginia (7–2)	Georgia Tech (9–3)	South Carolina (13–3)	New Mexico State (12–2)	New Orleans (17–2)	LSU (13–6)	Michigan State (13–6)	Georgetown (15–8)	Seton Hall (18–7)	Princeton (23–2)	Michigan State (18–10)	22.
23.	Georgia	St. John's (2–0)	Kansas (2–1)	Southern Miss (2–1)	Temple (3–2)	New Mexico State (7–1) т	South Carolina (9–2)	Southern Miss (6–1)	Utah (15–1)	New Orleans (15–2)	Connecticut (12–6)	Oklahoma (15–6)	Wake Forest (16–7)	Texas (17–6) т	Texas (18–6)	Seton Hall (19–8)	Georgetown (18–12)	23.
24.	Temple	LSU (1–1)	Texas (1–1)	Texas (3–2)	Michigan State (3–3)	Virginia (6–2) т	Georgia (7–3)	Michigan State (8–4)	New Orleans (13–2)	Kansas (11–4)	Seton Hall (13–4)	Texas (14–5)	New Orleans (19–5)	Alabama (16–7) т	NC State (16–8)	Louisiana Tech (21–9)	NC State (19–10)	24.
25.	Notre Dame	New Mexico State (2–0) т Houston (2–0) т	East Tennessee State (3–1)	Villanova (5–1)	DePaul (6–2)	Alabama (6–3) т	Georgia Tech (7–3)	Georgia (8–4)	Wyoming (13–2)	Georgia Tech (10–5)	Georgia Tech (12–5)	Mississippi State (14–5)	LSU (15–7)	Seton Hall (16–7) т NC State (15–7) т	Georgetown (16–9)	Texas (20–7)	Texas (22–8)	25.
	Preseason	Week 2 Nov. 27	Week 3 Dec. 4	Week 4 Dec. 11	Week 5 Dec. 18	Week 6 Dec. 25	Week 7 Jan. 1	Week 8 Jan. 8	Week 9 Jan. 15	Week 10 Jan. 22	Week 11 Jan. 29	Week 12 Feb. 5	Week 13 Feb. 12	Week 14 Feb. 19	Week 15 Feb. 26	Week 16 Mar. 5	Final Mar. 12	
		Dropped: Kansas; Temple (0–1); Notre Dame	Dropped: Virginia (3–2); Missouri (2–1); Louisville (0–1); Houston	Dropped: New Mexico State; Kansas; East Tennessee State	Dropped: Kentucky (5–1); Georgia Tech; Alabama; Virginia (5–2); Texas (3–2); Villanova	Dropped: Princeton; Temple; DePaul	Dropped: Alabama	None	Dropped: Iowa (13–3); Georgia Tech; Michigan State; Georgia	Dropped: Seton Hall; South Carolina; Wyoming	Dropped: Michigan State; Kansas (13–4)	Dropped: Pittsburgh (15–7); Connecticut; Seton Hall; Georgia Tech	Dropped: Oklahoma; Mississippi State (15–6)	Dropped: Michigan State; Wake Forest; New Orleans	Dropped: Virginia (19–9); Mississippi State (18–7)	Dropped: Georgia Tech; NC State; Georgetown (16–11)	Dropped: Southern Miss (21–7); DePaul (20–8); Louisiana Tech (21–9)	
