= 1990–91 Louisville Cardinals men's basketball team =

American college basketball season

1990–91 Louisville Cardinals men's basketball
- Conference: Metro Conference (1975–1995)
- Record: 14–16 (4–10 Metro)
- Head coach: Denny Crum (20th season)
- Home arena: Freedom Hall

1990–91 Metro Conference men's basketball standings
	Conf.				Overall
Team	W		L	PCT	W		L	PCT
No. 25 Southern Miss	10	–	4	.714	21	–	8	.724
Florida State †	9	–	5	.643	21	–	11	.656
Cincinnati	8	–	6	.571	18	–	12	.600
Tulane	7	–	7	.500	15	–	13	.536
Memphis	7	–	7	.500	17	–	15	.531
Virginia Tech	6	–	8	.429	13	–	16	.448
South Carolina	5	–	9	.357	20	–	13	.606
Louisville	4	–	10	.286	14	–	16	.467
† 1991 Metro Conference tournament winner Rankings from AP Poll

The 1990–91 Louisville Cardinals men's basketball team represented the University of Louisville in the 1990–91 NCAA Division I men's basketball season. The head coach was Denny Crum and the team finished the season with an overall record of 14–16.

== Roster ==
1990–91 Louisville Cardinals men's basketball team
Players	Coaches
Pos. / # / Name / Height / Weight / Year / Hometown; SG / 23 / LaBradford Smith / 6 ft 3 in (1.91 m) / 195 lb (88 kg) / Sr / Bay City / Bay City, Texas	Head coach: Denny Crum (UCLA); Assistant coach(es) Legend: (C) Team captain; (S) Suspended; (I) Ineligible; (W) Walk-on; Injured; Current redshirt
