= East Carolina Pirates men's basketball statistical leaders =

The East Carolina Pirates men's basketball statistical leaders are individual statistical leaders of the East Carolina Pirates men's basketball program in various categories, including points, rebounds, assists, steals, and blocks. Within those areas, the lists identify single-game, single-season, and career leaders. The Pirates represent East Carolina University in the NCAA's American Athletic Conference.

East Carolina began competing in intercollegiate basketball in 1931. However, the school's record book does not generally list records from before the 1950s, as records from before this period are often incomplete and inconsistent. Since scoring was much lower in this era, and teams played much fewer games during a typical season, it is likely that few or no players from this era would appear on these lists anyway.

The NCAA did not officially record assists as a stat until the 1983–84 season, and blocks and steals until the 1985–86 season, but East Carolina's record books includes players in these stats before these seasons. These lists are updated through the end of the 2020–21 season.

== Scoring ==
Career
Rk	Player	Points	Seasons
1	Bobby Hodges	2,018	1951–52 1952–53 1953–54
2	Lester Lyons	1,825	1990–91 1991–92 1992–93 1993–94
3	RJ Felton	1,774	2021–22 2022–23 2023–24 2024–25
4	Sonny Russell	1,653	1950–51 1951–52 1952–53
5	Caleb White	1,578	2013–14 2014–15 2015–16 2016–17
6	B.J. Tyson	1,570	2014–15 2015–16 2016–17 2017–18
7	Darrius Morrow	1,506	2008–09 2009–10 2010–11 2011–12
8	Anton Gill	1,485	1991–92 1992–93 1993–94 1994–95
9	Jayden Gardner	1,462	2018–19 2019–20 2020–21
10	Bill Otte	1,368	1960–61 1961–62 1962–63 1963–64

Season
Rk	Player	Points	Season
1	Blue Edwards	773	1988–89
2	Jordan Riley	708	2025–26
3	Oliver Mack	699	1977–78
4	Maurice Kemp	660	2012–13
5	RJ Felton	620	2024–25
6	Akeem Richmond	612	2013–14
7	Jayden Gardner	610	2019–20
7	RJ Felton	570	2023–24
9	C.J. Walker	550	2024–25
10	Johnny Edwards	539	1982–83

Single game
Rk	Player	Points	Season	Opponent
1	Oliver Mack	47	1977–78	USC-Aiken
2	Gus Hill	43	1987–88	Navy
3	Jim Modlin	42	1969–70	Western Carolina
4	Oliver Mack	41	1977–78	UT-Chattanooga
5	Anton Gill	40	1993–94	William & Mary
	Jordan Riley	40	2025–26	Wichita State
7	Oliver Mack	39	1977–78	Boston College
8	Blue Edwards	38	1988–89	UMBC
	Oliver Mack	38	1977–78	Maryland
10	Akeem Richmond	37	2013–14	Campbell
	Akeem Richmond	37	2013–14	Fayetteville State
	Jordan Riley	37	2025–26	Rice

== Rebounds ==
Career
Rk	Player	Rebounds	Seasons
1	Bill Otte	969	1960–61 1961–62 1962–63 1963–64
2	Erroyl Bing	939	2000–01 2001–02 2002–03 2003–04 2004–05
3	Larry Hunt	906	1973–74 1974–75 1975–76 1976–77
4	Jim Gregory	852	1968–69 1969–70 1970–71
5	Al Faber	816	1970–71 1971–72 1972–73
6	Ike Copeland	808	1989–90 1990–91 1991–92 1992–93
7	Darrius Morrow	778	2008–09 2009–10 2010–11 2011–12
8	Jim Fairley	727	1969–70 1970–71 1971–72
	Anton Gill	727	1991–92 1992–93 1993–94 1994–95
10	Corey Rouse	712	2002–03 2003–04 2004–05 2005–06

Season
Rk	Player	Rebounds	Season
1	Bill Otte	332	1961–62
2	Jim Fairley	314	1969–70
3	Al Faber	304	1970–71
4	Robert Sampson	303	2012–13
5	Corey Rouse	301	2005–06
6	Al Faber	297	1971–72
7	Jim Fairley	292	1971–72
8	Giovanni Emejuru	286	2025–26
9	Jayden Gardner	285	2019–20
10	Larry Hunt	284	1974–75

Single game
Rk	Player	Rebounds	Season	Opponent
1	Erroyl Bing	24	2002–03	USF
	Jim Fairley	24	1969–70	Belmont Abbey
	Bill Otte	24	1961–62	Atlantic Christian
4	Jim Fairley	23	1969–70	VMI
5	Al Faber	22	1970–71	VMI
	Al Faber	22	1970–71	Belmont Abbey
7	Jim Gregory	21	1970–71	Belmont Abbey
	Jim Gregory	21	1970–71	St. Francis (Pa.)
	Charles Alford	21	1965–66	Atlantic Christian
	Charles Alford	21	1964–65	Atlantic Christian

== Assists ==
Career
Rk	Player	Assists	Seasons
1	Brock Young	612	2007–08 2008–09 2009–10 2010–11
2	Miguel Paul	419	2011–12 2012–13
3	Travis Holcomb-Faye	413	1999–00 2000–01 2001–02 2002–03
4	Japhet McNeil	365	2003–04 2004–05 2005–06
5	Darrell Jenkins	347	2006–07 2007–08
6	Tristen Newton	337	2019–20 2020–21 2021–22
7	Tony Parham	330	1994–95 1995–96 1996–97 1997–98
8	Lester Lyons	326	1990–91 1991–92 1992–93 1993–94
9	Prince Williams	280	2012–13 2013–14 2014–15 2015–16
10	Isaac Fleming	269	2017–18 2018–19
	Jeff Kelly	269	1985–86 1986–87 1987–88 1988–89

Season
Rk	Player	Assists	Season
1	Miguel Paul	236	2012–13
2	Brock Young	227	2008–09
3	Miguel Paul	183	2011–12
4	Darrell Jenkins	181	2007–08
5	Brock Young	171	2009–10
6	Darrell Jenkins	166	2006–07
7	Tristen Newton	151	2021–22
8	Japhet McNeil	146	2005–06
9	Isaac Fleming	144	2017–18
10	Brock Young	133	2010–11
	Cam Hayes	133	2024–25

Single game
Rk	Player	Assists	Season	Opponent
1	Miguel Paul	14	2012–13	UAB
	Brock Young	14	2008–09	Rice
	Tom Miller	14	1968–69	East Tennessee State
4	Jaden Walker	13	2023–24	UTSA
	Darrell Jenkins	13	2007–08	N.C. Central
	Walter Moseley	13	1977–78	UT-Chattanooga
	Ernie Pope	13	1972–73	Appalachian State
8	Cian Medley	12	2026–27	UNC Wilmington
	Miguel Paul	12	2011–12	Southern Miss
	Brock Young	12	2008–09	Houston
	Brock Young	12	2008–09	UNC Greensboro
	Brock Young	12	2008–09	UNC Wilmington
	Darrell Jenkins	12	2006–07	Morgan State
	Japhet McNeil	12	2005–06	Saint Paul's
	Mike Cook	12	2004–05	Belmont Abbey
	Jeff Kelly	12	1988–89	Navy
	Herb Dixon	12	1984–85	Richmond
	Jimmy Hinton	12	1987–88	Navy
	Paul Childress	12	1990–91	N.C. Wesleyan

== Steals ==
Career
Rk	Player	Steals	Seasons
1	Lester Lyons	235	1990–91 1991–92 1992–93 1993–94
2	Brock Young	154	2007–08 2008–09 2009–10 2010–11
3	Curt Vanderhorst	151	1982–83 1983–84 1984–85 1985–86
4	Paris Roberts-Campbell	146	2011–12 2012–13 2013–14 2014–15
5	Japhet McNeil	141	2003–04 2004–05 2005–06
	RJ Felton	141	2021–22 2022–23 2023–24 2024–25
7	Jordan Riley	124	2024–25 2025–26
8	Corvonn Gaines	117	2009–10 2010–11 2011–12 2012–13
9	Tony Parham	115	1994–95 1995–96 1996–97 1997–98
10	Tim Basham	110	1993–94 1994–95 1995–96 1996–97

Season
Rk	Player	Steals	Season
1	Lester Lyons	70	1990–91
2	Lester Lyons	69	1992–93
3	Jordan Riley	66	2024–25
4	Maurice Kemp	61	2012–13
5	Japhet McNeil	59	2004–05
	RJ Felton	59	2023–24
7	Jordan Riley	58	2025–26
8	Antonio Robinson	55	2014–15
	Corvonn Gaines	55	2010–11
10	Paris Roberts-Campbell	53	2013–14
	Lester Lyons	53	1993–94
	Curt Vanderhorst	53	1984–85

Single game
Rk	Player	Steals	Season	Opponent
1	Kentrell Barkley	7	2017–18	USF
	Lester Lyons	7	1990–91	UNC Wilmington
	Curt Vanderhorst	7	1984–85	Winthrop
4	Jeremy Sheppard	6	2016–17	USF
	Lance Tejada	6	2014–15	UCF
	Maurice Kemp	6	2012–13	Rice
	Miguel Paul	6	2011–12	Massachusetts
	Corvonn Gaines	6	2010–11	Campbell
	Brock Young	6	2009–10	South Dakota St.
	Gabe Blair	6	2007–08	SMU
	Japhet McNeil	6	2005–06	Wofford
	Tony Robinson	6	1982–83	Campbell
	Lester Lyons	6	1990–91	Navy
	Lester Lyons	6	1992–93	George Mason
	Lester Lyons	6	1992–93	Florida Atlantic
	Lester Lyons	6	1992–93	Virginia Tech
	Lester Lyons	6	1993–94	Eastern Michigan
	Jordan Riley	6	2025–26	Georgia Southern
	Jordan Riley	6	2025–26	UTSA

== Blocks ==
Career
Rk	Player	Blocks	Seasons
1	Moussa Badiane	314	2001–02 2002–03 2003–04 2004–05
2	Darrius Morrow	112	2008–09 2009–10 2010–11 2011–12
3	John Fields	104	2006–07 2007–08
4	Herb Gary	103	1976–77 1977–78 1978–79 1979–80
5	Robert Sampson	97	2010–11 2011–12 2012–13
6	Andre Washington	95	2016–17
7	Chad Wynn	89	2007–08 2008–09 2009–10 2010–11
8	Leon Bass	81	1983–84 1984–85 1985–86 1986–87
9	Lester Lyons	73	1990–91 1991–92 1992–93 1993–94
10	Maurice Kemp	66	2011–12 2012–13

Season
Rk	Player	Blocks	Season
1	Andre Washington	95	2016–17
2	Moussa Badiane	90	2003–04
3	Moussa Badiane	87	2001–02
4	Moussa Badiane	75	2004–05
5	Moussa Badiane	62	2002–03
6	Robert Sampson	60	2012–13
7	John Fields	56	2007–08
8	Giovanni Emejuru	53	2025–26
9	John Fields	48	2006–07
10	Herb Gray	46	1977–78

Single game
Rk	Player	Blocks	Season	Opponent
1	Moussa Badiane	8	2003–04	Memphis
	Moussa Badiane	8	2001–02	Old Dominion
	Greg Cornelius	8	1977–78	UNC Asheville
4	Andre Washington	7	2016–17	Tulane
	John Fields	7	2006–07	USF
	John Fields	7	2006–07	Limestone
	Moussa Badiane	7	2001–02	Radford
	Moussa Badiane	7	2001–02	Lees-McRae
9	Andre Washington	6	2016–17	Tulane
	Andre Washington	6	2016–17	USF
	Andre Washington	6	2016–17	Stetson
	Moussa Badiane	6	2001–02	Louisville
	Moussa Badiane	6	2001–02	Marquette
	Giovanni Emejuru	6	2025–26	South Florida
