= 1992–93 George Mason Patriots men's basketball team =

American college basketball season

1992–93 George Mason Patriots men's basketball
- Conference: Colonial Athletic Association
- Record: 7–21 (2–12 CAA)
- Head coach: Ernie Nestor (5th season)
- Home arena: Patriot Center

1992–93 CAA men's basketball standings
	Conf.				Overall
Team	W		L	PCT	W		L	PCT
James Madison	11	–	3	.786	21	–	9	.700
Old Dominion	11	–	3	.786	21	–	8	.724
Richmond	10	–	4	.714	15	–	12	.556
American	6	–	8	.429	11	–	17	.393
William & Mary	6	–	8	.429	14	–	13	.519
UNC Wilmington	6	–	8	.429	17	–	11	.607
East Carolina †	4	–	10	.286	13	–	17	.433
George Mason	2	–	12	.143	7	–	21	.250
† 1993 CAA tournament winner Rankings from AP Poll

The 1992–93 George Mason Patriots Men's basketball team represented George Mason University during the 1992–93 NCAA Division I men's basketball season. This was the 27th season for the program, the fifth and final under head coach Ernie Nestor. The Patriots played their home games at the Patriot Center in Fairfax, Virginia.

== Honors and awards ==
Colonial Athletic Association All-Rookie Team

- Troy Manns

== Player statistics ==
Player	GP	FG%	3FG%	FT%	RPG	APG	SPG	BPG	PPG
Derek Shackelford	28	.396	.421	.727	3.3	2.1	1.4	0.3	11.8
Troy Manns	27	.404	.365	.724	2.3	4.5	1.3	0.1	11.3
Donald Ross	24	.326	.325	.771	1.8	0.9	0.9	0.0	9.8
Mark McGlone	28	.497	.233	.680	6.0	1.2	0.9	0.2	9.7
Khyl Horton	28	.453	.118	.628	4.5	1.3	1.2	0.3	8.5
Camerron Taylor	27	.561	.000	.628	2.9	0.2	0.4	0.4	6.5
Kenny Johnson	25	.412	.000	.788	3.4	0.4	0.4	0.4	4.2
Craig Hodges	14	.327	.000	.700	3.7	0.6	0.5	0.3	3.4
Kenwan Alford	23	.448	.000	.391	2.8	0.3	0.6	0.5	3.0
Andrew Fingall	23	.357	.000	.485	2.3	0.3	0.4	0.3	2.4
Jamel Perkins	7	.286	.000	1.000	1.3	0.7	0.6	0.1	2.4
James Thompson	18	.286	.308	.429	0.9	0.7	0.3	0.1	1.9
Jemel Buck	22	.471	.000	.393	1.6	0.2	0.2	0.0	1.2

== Schedule and results ==
Date time, TV	Rank^{#}	Opponent^{#}	Result	Record	Site city, state
Non-conference regular season
November 18, 1992*		at UTEP; Preseason NIT	L 71–90	0–1	Special Events Center; El Paso, TX
December 1, 1992*		Morgan State	W 76–63	1–1	Patriot Center; Fairfax, VA
December 8, 1992*		Washington College (Div. III)	W 92–52	2–1	Patriot Center; Fairfax, VA
December 10, 1992*		at Monmouth	L 38–65	2–2	Boylan Gymnasium; West Long Branch, NJ
December 12, 1992*		Radford	W 95–75	3–2	Patriot Center; Fairfax, VA
December 19, 1992*		at Saint Peter's	W 70–61	4–2	Yanitelli Center; Jersey City, NJ
December 21, 1992*		Bucknell	L 60–73	4–3	Patriot Center; Fairfax, VA
December 29, 1992*		at Boise State; Boise State Tournament	L 76–83	4–4	BSU Pavilion; Boise, ID
December 30, 1992*		vs. Loyola (MD); Boise State Tournament	W 63–55	5–4	BSU Pavilion; Boise, ID
January 2, 1993*		at VCU; Rivalry	L 75–103	5–5	Richmond Coliseum; Richmond, VA
January 6, 1993*		at Towson State	L 71–78	5–6	Towson Center; Towson, MD
CAA regular season
January 9, 1993		Old Dominion	L 74–76	5–7 (0–1)	Patriot Center; Fairfax, VA
January 11, 1993		at William & Mary	L 89–92	5–8 (0–2)	William & Mary Hall; Williamsburg, VA
January 11, 1993*		Canisius	L 67–85	5–9	Patriot Center; Fairfax, VA
January 16, 1993		at UNC Wilmington	L 78–98	5–10 (0–3)	Trask Coliseum; Wilmington, NC
January 18, 1993		at East Carolina	L 64–68	5–11 (0–4)	Minges Coliseum; Greenville, NC
January 23, 1993		American	L 67–81	5–12 (0–5)	Patriot Center; Fairfax, VA
January 26, 1993*		Northeastern	L 71–82	5–13	Patriot Center; Fairfax, VA
January 30, 1993		James Madison	L 50–56	5–14 (0–6)	Patriot Center; Fairfax, VA
February 3, 1993		Richmond	L 62–81	5–15 (0–7)	Patriot Center; Fairfax, VA
February 6, 1993		at Old Dominion	L 62–91	5–16 (0–8)	Norfolk Scope; Norfolk, VA
February 10, 1993		William & Mary	L 78–82	5–17 (0–9)	Patriot Center; Fairfax, VA
February 13, 1993		East Carolina	L 51–81	5–18 (0–10)	Patriot Center; Fairfax, VA
February 15, 1993		UNC Wilmington	W 72–69	6–18 (1–10)	Patriot Center; Fairfax, VA
February 20, 1993		at American	W 73–66	7–18 (2–10)	Bender Arena; Washington, DC
February 24, 1993		at Richmond	L 58–61	7–19 (2–11)	Robins Center; Richmond, VA
February 27, 1993		at James Madison	L 59–75	7–20 (2–12)	JMU Convocation Center; Harrisonburg, VA
1993 CAA tournament
March 6, 1993	(8)	vs. (1) James Madison; Quarterfinals	L 49–60	7–21	Richmond Coliseum; Richmond, VA
*Non-conference game. ^{#}Rankings from AP Poll. (#) Tournament seedings in parentheses. All times are in Eastern Time.
