= Thomas Jasper =

Thomas Jasper may refer to:

- Thomas Chilton Jasper (1844–1924), American businessman and Civil War fighter
- Tom Jasper (born 1948), American college basketball player
