= 1990–91 Duke Blue Devils men's basketball team =

American college basketball season

1990–91 Duke Blue Devils men's basketball

NCAA tournament National Champions ACC regular season champions

National Championship Game, W 72–65 vs. Kansas
- Conference: Atlantic Coast Conference

Ranking
- Coaches: No. 6
- AP: No. 6
- Record: 32–7 (11–3 ACC)
- Head coach: Mike Krzyzewski (11th season)
- Assistant coaches: Pete Gaudet; Mike Brey; Tommy Amaker; Jay Bilas
- Home arena: Cameron Indoor Stadium

1990–91 ACC men's basketball standings
	Conf.				Overall
Team	W		L	PCT	W		L	PCT
No. 6 Duke	11	–	3	.786	32	–	7	.821
No. 4 North Carolina †	10	–	4	.714	29	–	6	.829
Wake Forest	8	–	6	.571	19	–	11	.633
NC State	8	–	6	.571	20	–	11	.645
Georgia Tech	6	–	8	.429	17	–	13	.567
Virginia	6	–	8	.429	21	–	12	.636
Maryland	5	–	9	.357	16	–	12	.571
Clemson	2	–	12	.143	11	–	17	.393
† 1991 ACC tournament winner Rankings from AP poll

The 1990–91 Duke Blue Devils men's basketball team was a Division I college basketball team that competed in the Atlantic Coast Conference. The team brought to Duke their first national championship when they defeated Kansas 72–65. Duke would win the championship again the following year, making Duke the first team since UCLA in 1973 to win back-to-back titles.

== Roster ==
Note: Flags indicate national team eligibility at FIBA sanctioned events. Players may hold other non-FIBA nationality not displayed.

No.		Position	Player
3	(United States)	G	Marty Clark
4	(United States)	G	Kenny Blakeney
5	(United States)	G	Billy McCaffrey
11	(United States)	G	Bobby Hurley
12	(United States)	F/G	Thomas Hill
21	(United States)	F	Antonio Lang
22	(United States)	F	Greg Koubek

No.		Position	Player
23	(United States)	G/F	Brian Davis
32	(United States)	F/C	Christian Laettner
33	(United States)	F/G	Grant Hill
34	(United States)	C	Crawford Palmer
45	(United States)	F/C	Clay Buckley
54	(Germany)	F	Christian Ast

== Expectations ==
The Blue Devils had ended the 1990 season with a record-setting 30-point loss to the UNLV Runnin' Rebels in the national championship game (103–73). After losing seniors Phil Henderson, Alaa Abdelnaby, and Robert Brickey to graduation, Duke welcomed a new addition to the team, freshman Grant Hill.

== Regular season ==
With junior Christian Laettner and sophomore Bobby Hurley leading the way, Duke placed third at the Preseason NIT (behind Arizona and Arkansas). The Blue Devils went on to compile a 25–6 regular season record, including a perfect 16–0 mark at home. Scoring victories in both rivalry matches against North Carolina and sporting an 11–3 conference record, Duke also captured their 9th regular-season championship in school history.

== Conference tournament ==
Duke entered the ACC tournament as a No. 1 seed, but stumbled in the ACC title game against North Carolina by a score of 96–74, even though the Blue Devils had defeated the Tar Heels twice during the regular season. As a result, North Carolina received the top seed in the East Regional, leaving Duke with a No. 2 seed in the Midwest Regional of the NCAA tournament.

== NCAA tournament ==
Duke however tore through the Midwest Regional, defeating St. John's to join UNLV, Kansas, and rival North Carolina in the Final Four in Indianapolis. Entering the semifinal game against UNLV, the Blue Devils were facing an undefeated and top-ranked Runnin' Rebels squad that boasted a 45-game winning streak and featured National Player of the Year Larry Johnson. In one of the biggest upsets in Final Four history, however, Duke got its revenge from a year ago by a score of 79–77 after Laettner hit two free throws with 12 seconds remaining and UNLV guard Anderson Hunt missed a three-point attempt at the end-of-game buzzer.

An all-ACC, Duke vs. UNC title game was averted when Roy Williams coached his Kansas Jayhawks team to victory over his mentor Dean Smith and his Tar Heels squad. In what would become the first of many matchups between Williams (later head coach at North Carolina until his retirement in 2021) and Mike Krzyzewski, Duke finally claimed its first national championship by a score of 72–65. Laettner was named NCAA basketball tournament Most Outstanding Player.

== Schedule ==
Date time, TV	Rank^{#}	Opponent^{#}	Result	Record	Site city, state
Regular season
November 14, 1990*	No. 6	Marquette; Preseason NIT	W 87–74	1–0	Cameron Indoor Stadium; Durham, NC
November 16, 1990*	No. 6	Boston College; Preseason NIT	W 100–76	2–0	Cameron Indoor Stadium; Durham, NC
November 21, 1990*; ESPN	No. 6	vs. No. 2 Arkansas; Preseason NIT	L 88–98	2–1	Madison Square Garden; New York, NY
November 23, 1990*; ESPN	No. 6	vs. Notre Dame; Preseason NIT	W 85–77	3–1	Madison Square Garden; New York, NY
November 26, 1990*; 7:30 pm	No. 6	East Carolina	W 125–82	4–1	Cameron Indoor Stadium; Durham, NC
December 1, 1990*; 7:30 pm	No. 8	Charlotte	W 111–94	5–1	Cameron Indoor Stadium; Durham, NC
December 5, 1990*; 9:00 pm, ESPN	No. 5	at No. 6 Georgetown; ACC/Big East Challenge	L 74–79	5–2	Capital Center; Landover, Maryland
December 8, 1990*; 2:00 pm, ABC	No. 5	Michigan	W 75–68	6–2	Cameron Indoor Stadium; Durham, NC
December 19, 1990*; 7:30 pm	No. 9	at Harvard	W 83–66	7–2	Briggs Athletic Center; Cambridge, MA
December 22, 1990*; 3:45 pm, CBS	No. 9	at No. 11 Oklahoma	W 90–85	8–2	Lloyd Noble Center; Norman, OK
December 29, 1990*; 7:30 pm	No. 8	Lehigh	W 97–67	9–2	Cameron Indoor Stadium; Durham, NC
January 2, 1991*; 7:30 pm	No. 8	Boston University	W 109–55	10–2	Cameron Indoor Stadium; Durham, NC
January 5, 1991; 12:30 pm	No. 8	at No. 18 Virginia	L 64–81	10–3 (0–1)	University Hall; Charlottesville, VA
January 9, 1991; 9:00 pm	No. 14	No. 24 Georgia Tech	W 98–57	11–3 (1–1)	Cameron Indoor Stadium; Durham, NC
January 12, 1991; 1:00 pm	No. 14	at Maryland	W 94–78	12–3 (2–1)	Cole Field House; College Park, MD
January 14, 1991; 9:00 pm	No. 14	Wake Forest	W 89–67	13–3 (3–1)	Cameron Indoor Stadium; Durham, NC
January 16, 1991*; 7:30 pm	No. 12	at The Citadel	W 83–50	14–3	McAlister Field House; Charleston, SC
January 19, 1991; 8:00 pm	No. 12	No. 5 North Carolina	W 74–60	15–3 (4–1)	Cameron Indoor Stadium; Durham, NC
January 23, 1991; 7:00 pm	No. 9	at NC State	L 89–95	15–4 (4–2)	Reynolds Coliseum; Raleigh, NC
January 26, 1991; 4:00 pm	No. 9	at Clemson	W 99–70	16–4 (5–2)	Littlejohn Coliseum; Clemson, SC
January 30, 1991; 9:00 pm	No. 7	at No. 23 Georgia Tech	W 77–75	17–4 (6–2)	Alexander Memorial Coliseum; Atlanta, GA
February 2, 1991*; 4:00 pm	No. 7	at Notre Dame	W 90–77	18–4	Joyce Center; Notre Dame, IN
February 7, 1991; 9:00 pm	No. 6	No. 11 Virginia	W 86–74	19–4 (7–2)	Cameron Indoor Stadium; Durham, NC
February 9, 1991; 1:00 pm	No. 6	Maryland	W 101–81	20–4 (8–2)	Cameron Indoor Stadium; Durham, NC
February 10, 1991*; 2:00 pm	No. 6	No. 19 LSU	W 88–70	21–4	Cameron Indoor Stadium; Durham, NC
February 13, 1991*	No. 5	Davidson	W 74–39	22–4	Cameron Indoor Stadium; Durham, NC
February 16, 1991; 4:00 pm	No. 5	at Wake Forest	L 77–86	22–5 (8–3)	Lawrence Joel Coliseum; Winston-Salem, NC
February 20, 1991; 9:00 pm	No. 7	vs. NC State	W 72–65	23–5 (9–3)	Cameron Indoor Stadium; Durham, NC
February 24, 1991*; 4:00 pm	No. 7	at No. 9 Arizona	L 96–103 ^{2OT}	23–6	McKale Center; Tucson, AZ
February 27, 1991; 9:00 pm	No. 8	Clemson	W 79–62	24–6 (10–3)	Cameron Indoor Stadium; Durham, NC
March 3, 1991; 2:00 pm	No. 8	at No. 4 North Carolina	W 83–77	25–6 (11–3)	Dean Smith Center; Chapel Hill, NC
ACC Tournament
March 9, 1991	No. 6	vs. NC State; ACC tournament semifinals	W 93–72	26–6	Charlotte Coliseum; Charlotte, NC
March 10, 1991; Raycom (Locally); CBS (Nationally)	No. 6	vs. No. 7 North Carolina; ACC Tournament Finals	L 74–96	26–7	Charlotte Coliseum; Charlotte, NC
NCAA Tournament
March 14, 1991*; CBS	(2 MW) No. 6	vs. (15 MW) Northeast Louisiana; NCAA Midwest First round	W 102–73	27–7	Hubert H. Humphrey Metrodome; Minneapolis, MN
March 16, 1991*; CBS	(2 MW) No. 6	vs. (7 MW) Iowa; NCAA Midwest Second Round	W 85–70	28–7	Hubert H. Humphrey Metrodome; Minneapolis, MN
March 22, 1991*; CBS	(2 MW) No. 6	vs. (11 MW) Connecticut; NCAA Midwest Regional semifinal	W 81–67	29–7	Pontiac Silverdome; Pontiac, MI
March 24, 1991*; CBS	(2 MW) No. 6	vs. (4 MW) No. 20 St. John's; NCAA Midwest Regional Final	W 78–61	30–7	Pontiac Silverdome; Pontiac, MI
March 30, 1991*; CBS	(2 MW) No. 6	vs. (1 W) No. 1 UNLV; NCAA National semifinal	W 79–77	31–7	RCA Dome; Indianapolis, IN
April 1, 1991*; 21:00, CBS	(2 MW) No. 6	vs. (3 SE) No. 12 Kansas; NCAA national championship	W 72–65	32–7	RCA Dome; Indianapolis, IN
*Non-conference game. ^{#}Rankings from Coaches' Poll. (#) Tournament seedings in parentheses.

== Accomplishments ==
- 1st basketball championship after 4 previous appearances in title game (1964, 1978, 1986, 1990)
- 2nd straight appearance in national championship game (1990, 1991)
- 4th straight appearance in Final Four (1988–1991)
- Christian Laettner was a consensus All-American Second Team selection.
- Three players received All-ACC honors:
  - Christian Laettner (1st Team)
  - Bobby Hurley, Thomas Hill (3rd Team)
- Three players from the 1991 squad (Laettner, Hurley, and Grant Hill) had their jerseys retired by Duke.
