= Maurice Kemp =

American basketball player (born 1991)

No. 9 – Hapoel Galil Elyon
- Position: Power forward
- League: Israeli Basketball Premier League

Personal information
- Born: February 2, 1991 (age 35) Miami, Florida, U.S.
- Listed height: 6 ft 8 in (2.03 m)
- Listed weight: 215 lb (98 kg)

Career information
- High school: Miami Dade Christian Academy (Miami, Florida)
- College: Alabama A&M (2009–2010); Miami Dade College (2010–2011); East Carolina (2011–2013)
- NBA draft: 2013: undrafted
- Playing career: 2013–present

Career history
- 2013–2014: Alba Fehérvár
- 2015: Canton Charge
- 2015–2016: Kavala B.C.
- 2016: Rapla KK
- 2016–2017: Tadamon Zouk
- 2017–2018: Obras Sanitarias
- 2018–2019: Fuenlabrada
- 2020: Club Nacional de Football
- 2020–2021: BC Kalev
- 2021: Gigantes de Carolina
- 2021: Maccabi Rishon LeZion
- 2021–2023: Bnei Herzliya
- 2023: Hong Kong Bulls
- 2023–2024: Guangzhou Loong Lions
- 2024: Fujian Sturgeons
- 2024–2025: Pistoia Basket 2000
- 2025–2026: Al Riyadi Club Beirut
- 2026–present: Hapoel Galil Elyon

Career highlights
- All-Israeli League Second Team (2023); Israeli State Cup winner (2022); Latvian–Estonian League champion (2021); Latvian–Estonian League Final 6 MVP (2021); Estonian Supercup winner (2021); First-team All-Conference USA (2013)

Maurice Leroy Kemp Jr (born February 2, 1991) is an American professional basketball player for Hapoel Galil Elyon of the Israeli Basketball Premier League. He played college basketball for Alabama A&M, Miami Dade College, and East Carolina, with whom he led Conference USA in scoring in his senior year.

== Early life ==
He was born in Miami, Florida, to Valerie and Maurice Kemp Sr., and he has three siblings. Kemp grew up in Miami, as well as Pembroke Pines, Florida.

Kemp attended Miami Dade Christian Academy, graduating in 2009, and played for the basketball team. As a senior, he averaged 26 points and 11 rebounds a game. He was named second-team All State and first-team All County as a senior. He was also on the high school track and field team.

He is 6 ft 8 in (203 cm) tall, and weighs 190 pounds (86 kg).

== College ==
=== 2009–2011: Alabama A&M and Miami Dade College ===
Kemp attended Alabama A&M from 2009 to 2010, playing for the Alabama A&M Bulldogs basketball team. He averaged 5.5 points per game, on 47.8% shooting from the field, and 34.8% shooting from beyond the 3 point line; he also picked up 2.8 rebounds per game.

He then attended Miami Dade College from 2010 to 2011. Playing small forward for the Sharks basketball team, Kemp averaged 16.9 points on shooting percentages of 59% from the floor, 52% behind the 3-point line, and 65% on free throws, while also averaging 9.9 rebounds (17th nationally), 1.8 assists, 1.8 blocks, and 1.5 steals a game. He was named as first-team All-Florida Community College Activities Association.

=== 2011–2013: East Carolina ===
Kemp then attended East Carolina University (ECU), where he majored in child development and family relations, and played basketball for the East Carolina Pirates as a junior in 2011–12. Here, he averaged 10.5 points and 6.3 rebounds per game. He also shot 77.9% on free throws across the entire season (7th in Conference USA), and 88.9% on free throws during conference games (which led the conference); his 2.4 offensive rebounds per game were 10th in the conference. He was unanimously selected as a member of the Conference USA Men's Basketball All-Academic Team.

As a senior at ECU in 2012–13, Kemp led Conference USA (C-USA) in scoring with 18.9 points per game (becoming the first player in the program's history to lead the C-USA in scoring), and in points (660). He was 2nd in the conference in field goals (231; 15th in the NCAA), 2-point field goals (215; 9th in the NCAA), and free throws made (182), 4th in field goal percentage (50.5%), 4th in defensive rebounds (193), and 5th in steals (61) and steals per game (1.1). He became the third player with the Pirates to score more than 600 points in a single season, and established new school single-season records for made and attempted free throws (182/241, respectively), and minutes played (1,202). He received first-team All-Conference USA (the first East Carolina player to receive them), and second-team National Association of Basketball Coaches (NABC) All-District 11 honors, as well as being named MVP of the 2013 CollegeInsider.com Tournament (CIT).

He ended his career with the Pirates ranked ninth in school history with 66 blocks.

== Professional career ==
After turning professional, Kemp played in 2013–14 for Alba Fehérvár in the EuroCup, where he averaged 12.3 points and 1.5 steals per game, and shot 82.1% from the free throw line. During the 2014–15 season, he played for the Canton Charge of the G League, and in 2015–16 for Kavala B.C. in the Greek Basket League. In 2016–17, he played for the Tadamon Zouk of the Lebanese Basketball League, where he averaged 23.4 points (3rd in the league), with 8.6 rebounds (8th), and 1.9 steals (5th). He moved on to the Liga Nacional de Básquet, where he played for the Obras Sanitarias in 2017–18; here, he averaged 20.7 points per game, leading the league.

He played in 2018–19 for Montakit Fuenlabrada in the Liga ACB, and in 2020–21 for Kalev/Cramo in the VTB United League, where he averaged 12.5 points and 5.5 rebounds per game, and was 9th in the league with 0.9 blocks per game, with a .548 field goal percentage (2nd). He also helped the team win the Latvian-Estonian Basketball League and was named the MVP of the competition.

In 2021–22, Kemp played for Maccabi Rishon LeZion in the Israeli Basketball Premier League, where he averaged 16.0 points (10th in the league), 6.4 rebounds, and 2.0 assists per game. He joined Bnei Herzliya in the Israeli Basketball Premier League on December 8, 2021.

On November 22, 2024, Kemp signed with the Pistoia Basket 2000 of the Lega Basket Serie A (LBA).

On August 12, 2025, Kemp signed with Al Riyadi Club Beirut of the Lebanese Basketball League.

== See also ==
- East Carolina Pirates men's basketball statistical leaders
