= 1988–89 George Mason Patriots men's basketball team =

American college basketball season

1988–89 George Mason Patriots men's basketball

CAA tournament champions

NCAA tournament
- Conference: Colonial Athletic Association
- Record: 20–11 (10–4 CAA)
- Head coach: Ernie Nestor (1st season)
- Home arena: Patriot Center

1988–89 CAA men's basketball standings
	Conf.				Overall
Team	W		L	PCT	W		L	PCT
Richmond	13	–	1	.929	21	–	10	.677
George Mason †	10	–	4	.714	20	–	11	.645
American	9	–	5	.643	17	–	11	.607
UNC Wilmington	9	–	5	.643	16	–	14	.533
James Madison	6	–	8	.429	16	–	14	.533
East Carolina	6	–	8	.429	15	–	14	.517
William & Mary	2	–	12	.143	5	–	23	.179
Navy	1	–	13	.071	6	–	22	.214
† 1989 CAA tournament winner Rankings from AP Poll

The 1988–89 George Mason Patriots Men's basketball team represented George Mason University during the 1988–89 NCAA Division I men's basketball season. This was the 23rd season for the program, the first under head coach Ernie Nestor. The Patriots played their home games at the Patriot Center in Fairfax, Virginia.

After finishing second in the regular season CAA standings, the team won the CAA tournament to receive an automatic bid to the NCAA tournament as #15 seed in the West region. The Patriots were beaten by #2 seed Indiana in the opening round to finish with a record of 20–11 (10–4 CAA).

== Roster ==
1988–89 George Mason Patriots men's basketball team
Players	Coaches
Pos. / # / Name / Height / Weight / Year / Hometown; F / / Kenny Sanders / 6 ft 5 in (1.96 m) / — / Sr	Head coach: Ernie Nestor; Assistant coach(es) Legend: (C) Team captain; (S) Suspended; (I) Ineligible; (W) Walk-on; Injured; Current redshirt

== Schedule and results ==
Date time, TV	Rank^{#}	Opponent^{#}	Result	Record	Site city, state
Regular season
Nov 26, 1988*		Penn State	L 54–58	0–1	Patriot Center; Fairfax, Virginia
Nov 29, 1988*		at Wichita State	L 75–96	0–2	Levitt Arena; Wichita, Kansas
Dec 3, 1988*		Bluefield College	W 117–73	1–2	Patriot Center; Fairfax, Virginia
Dec 6, 1988*		Long Island University	W 78–74	2–2	Patriot Center; Fairfax, Virginia
Dec 9, 1988*		vs. Georgia Southern; Drake Classic	L 58–76	2–3	Veterans Memorial Auditorium; Des Moines, Iowa
Dec 10, 1988*		vs. Wright State; Drake Classic	W 98–95 ^{2OT}	3–3	Veterans Memorial Auditorium; Des Moines, Iowa
Dec 17, 1988*		at VCU	L 78–90	3–4	Richmond Coliseum; Richmond, Virginia
Dec 29, 1988*		Old Dominion	L 72–79	3–5	Patriot Center; Fairfax, Virginia
Jan 3, 1989*		Marist	W 72–61	4–5	Patriot Center; Fairfax, Virginia
Jan 5, 1989*		Radford	L 79–82	4–6	Patriot Center; Fairfax, Virginia
Jan 7, 1989		at American	L 68–70	4–7 (0–1)	Bender Arena; Washington, D.C.
CAA tournament
Mar 4, 1989*		vs. William & Mary; CAA tournament championship	W 75–72	18–10	Hampton Coliseum; Hampton, Virginia
Mar 5, 1989*		vs. East Carolina; CAA tournament championship	W 65–58	19–10	Hampton Coliseum; Hampton, Virginia
Mar 6, 1989*		vs. UNC Wilmington; CAA tournament championship	W 78–72 ^{OT}	20–10	Hampton Coliseum; Hampton, Virginia
NCAA tournament
Mar 17, 1989*	(15 W)	vs. (2 W) No. 8 Indiana; First Round	L 85–99	20–11	McKale Center; Tucson, Arizona
*Non-conference game. ^{#}Rankings from AP Poll. (#) Tournament seedings in parentheses. All times are in Eastern Time.
