= Christian Ast =

German basketball player

Personal information
- Born: 20 July 1971 (age 55) Heidelberg, West Germany
- Listed height: 203 cm (6 ft 8 in)
- Listed weight: 97 kg (214 lb)

Career information
- High school: High Point (Beltsville, Maryland, U.S.)
- College: Duke (1990–1992); American (1993–1995)
- NBA draft: 1995: undrafted
- Position: Power forward

Career history
- 2000–2001: ratiopharm Ulm
- 2001–2002: USC Heidelberg

Career highlights
- 2× NCAA champion (1991, 1992); First-team All-CAA (1995)

Christian Ralph Ast (born 20 July 1971) is a German former professional basketball player. He played college basketball in the United States for the Duke Blue Devils and American Eagles. Ast won two NCAA championships with the Blue Devils in 1991 and 1992. He played professionally in Germany.

== Early life ==
Ast is a native of Heidelberg, Germany. His father was a professor of mathematics at the University of Heidelberg and his mother was an editorial assistant for a university publishing company. Ast grew up playing field hockey and only began playing basketball at the age of 15 because he was "sick of bending down."

Ast moved to the United States in 1988 as part of a foreign exchange program. He played basketball at High Point High School in Beltsville, Maryland. Ast played well in a scrimmage game against DeMatha Catholic High School and an opposing coach recommended him to Mike Krzyzewski of the Duke Blue Devils. On 5 March 1990, Ast committed to play for the Blue Devils.

== College basketball career ==
Ast averaged 2.2 points in 3.8 minutes per game during his freshman season with the Duke Blue Devils. The Blue Devils won the 1991 NCAA Division I basketball tournament. Ast averaged 1.1 points per game in 13 appearances during the 1991–92 season. The Blue Devils won a second consecutive national championship at the 1992 NCAA Division I basketball tournament. In May 1992, Ast left Duke as he desired to play more regularly and transferred to the American Eagles.

Ast sat out the 1992–93 season due to NCAA transfer regulations. He debuted for the Eagles during the 1993–94 season and averaged 9.9 points per game. After an 0–11 start to the 1994–95 season, Ast led the Eagles' resurgence and finished the season 7–7 in tournament play. East Carolina Pirates head coach Eddie Payne called Ast "a poor man's Larry Bird". He averaged 18.7 points per game and was selected to the All-Coastal Athletic Association (CAA) first-team in 1995.

== Professional career ==
Ast played for USC Heidelberg during the 2001–02 season after playing for Ratiopharm Ulm the previous season.

== Personal life ==
Ast is fluent in German, English and French.
