= 1990–91 NC State Wolfpack men's basketball team =

American college basketball season

1990–91 NC State Wolfpack men's basketball

NCAA tournament, second round
- Conference: Atlantic Coast Conference

Ranking
- Coaches: No. 24
- Record: 20–11 (8–6 ACC)
- Head coach: Les Robinson (1st season)
- Home arena: Reynolds Coliseum

1990–91 ACC men's basketball standings
| | Conf. | | | | Overall |
| Team | W | | L | PCT | W | | L | PCT |
|---|---|---|---|---|---|---|---|---|
| No. 6 Duke | 11 | – | 3 | .786 | 32 | – | 7 | .821 |
| No. 4 North Carolina † | 10 | – | 4 | .714 | 29 | – | 6 | .829 |
| Wake Forest | 8 | – | 6 | .571 | 19 | – | 11 | .633 |
| NC State | 8 | – | 6 | .571 | 20 | – | 11 | .645 |
| Georgia Tech | 6 | – | 8 | .429 | 17 | – | 13 | .567 |
| Virginia | 6 | – | 8 | .429 | 21 | – | 12 | .636 |
| Maryland | 5 | – | 9 | .357 | 16 | – | 12 | .571 |
| Clemson | 2 | – | 12 | .143 | 11 | – | 17 | .393 |
† 1991 ACC tournament winner Rankings from AP poll

The 1990–91 NC State Wolfpack men's basketball team represented North Carolina State University as a member of the Atlantic Coast Conference during the 1990–91 men's college basketball season. It was Les Robinson's first season as head coach. The Wolfpack earned a bid to the NCAA tournament and finished with a record of 20–11 (8–6 ACC).

== Roster ==
1990–91 NC State Wolfpack men's basketball team
Players
Coaches

| Pos. | # | Name | Height | Weight | Year | Hometown |
|---|---|---|---|---|---|---|
| G | 13 | Chris Corchiani | 6 ft 1 in (1.85 m) | 185 lb (84 kg) | Sr | Coral Gables, Florida |
| G | 21 | Rodney Monroe | 6 ft 3 in (1.91 m) | 185 lb (84 kg) | Sr | Baltimore, Maryland |
| F | 24 | Tom Gugliotta | 6 ft 10 in (2.08 m) | 235 lb (107 kg) | Jr | Huntington Station, New York |
| G/F | 34 | Bryant Feggins | 6 ft 6 in (1.98 m) | 195 lb (88 kg) | So | Winston-Salem, North Carolina |
| C | 42 | Kevin Thompson | 6 ft 11 in (2.11 m) | 245 lb (111 kg) | So | Kernersville, North Carolina |
| G | | Migjen Bakalli | 6 ft 6 in (1.98 m) | — | Fr | Russia |

Head coach

- Les Robinson (NC State)

Assistant coach(es)

Legend

- (C) Team captain
- (S) Suspended
- (I) Ineligible
- (W) Walk-on
- Injured
- Current redshirt

== Schedule ==
| Date time, TV | Rank^{#} | Opponent^{#} | Result | Record | Site city, state |
Regular Season
| Nov 23, 1990* | | at Florida International | W 120–79 | 1–0 | U.S. Century Bank Arena; Miami, Florida |
| Nov 28, 1990* | | Charleston Southern | W 135–80 | 2–0 | Reynolds Coliseum; Raleigh, North Carolina |
| Dec 1, 1990* | | Western Carolina | W 119–84 | 3–0 | Reynolds Coliseum; Raleigh, North Carolina |
| Dec 4, 1990* | | at No. 4 Syracuse; ACC-Big East Challenge | L 79–86 | 3–1 | Carrier Dome; Syracuse, New York |
| Dec 8, 1990* | | Mount St. Mary's | W 114–104 | 4–1 | Reynolds Coliseum; Raleigh, North Carolina |
| Dec 22, 1990* | | UNC Asheville | W 99–60 | 5–1 | Reynolds Coliseum; Raleigh, North Carolina |
| Dec 29, 1990* | | at No. 20 East Tennessee State | L 91–94 | 5–2 | Memorial Center; Johnson City, Tennessee |
| Jan 2, 1991 | | Clemson | W 74–70 | 6–2 (1–0) | Reynolds Coliseum; Raleigh, North Carolina |
| Jan 5, 1991* | | at Kansas | L 94–105 | 6–3 | Allen Fieldhouse; Lawrence, Kansas |
| Jan 7, 1991* | | Coastal Carolina | W 86–78 | 7–3 | Reynolds Coliseum; Raleigh, North Carolina |
| Jan 13, 1991 | | No. 24 Georgia Tech | W 90–83 | 8–3 (2–0) | Reynolds Coliseum; Raleigh, North Carolina |
| Jan 19, 1991 | | at Wake Forest | L 76–97 | 8–4 (2–1) | Lawrence Joel Coliseum; Winston-Salem, North Carolina |
| Jan 21, 1991* | | Marquette | W 89–76 | 9–4 | Reynolds Coliseum; Raleigh, North Carolina |
| Jan 23, 1991; 7:00 pm | | No. 9 Duke | W 95–89 | 10–4 (3–1) | Reynolds Coliseum; Raleigh, North Carolina |
| Jan 26, 1991 | | at Maryland | L 100–104 | 10–5 (3–2) | Jones-Hill House; College Park, Maryland |
| Jan 29, 1991 | | at No. 15 Virginia | L 72–104 | 10–6 (3–3) | University Hall; Charlottesville, Virginia |
| Feb 3, 1991 | | at No. 23 Georgia Tech | W 79–73 | 11–6 (4–3) | Alexander Memorial Coliseum; Atlanta, Georgia |
| Feb 6, 1991 | | No. 9 North Carolina | W 97–91 | 12–6 (5–3) | Reynolds Coliseum; Raleigh, North Carolina |
| Feb 7, 1991 | | at No. 9 North Carolina | L 70–92 | 12–7 (5–4) | Dean Smith Center; Chapel Hill, North Carolina |
| Feb 10, 1991 | | at Clemson | W 72–62 | 13–7 (6–4) | Littlejohn Coliseum; Clemson, South Carolina |
| Feb 13, 1991* | | Robert Morris | W 90–88 | 14–7 | Reynolds Coliseum; Raleigh, North Carolina |
| Feb 16, 1991*; CBS | | at UConn | W 60–59 | 15–7 | Harry A. Gampel Pavilion (8,241); Storrs, Connecticut |
| Feb 20, 1991; 9:00 pm | | at No. 7 Duke | L 65–72 | 15–8 (6–5) | Cameron Indoor Stadium; Durham, North Carolina |
| Feb 23, 1991 | | No. 20 Virginia | W 83–76 | 16–8 (7–5) | Reynolds Coliseum; Raleigh, North Carolina |
| Feb 25, 1991* | | at Tennessee | W 90–82 | 17–8 | Thompson-Boling Arena; Knoxville, Tennessee |
| Feb 27, 1991 | | Maryland | W 114–91 | 17–9 (7–6) | Reynolds Coliseum; Raleigh, North Carolina |
| Mar 2, 1991 | | Wake Forest | L 84–89 | 18–9 (8–6) | Reynolds Coliseum; Raleigh, North Carolina |
ACC Tournament
| Mar 8, 1991* | | vs. Georgia Tech; ACC Tournament Quarterfinal | W 82–68 | 19–9 | Charlotte Coliseum; Charlotte, North Carolina |
| Mar 9, 1991* | | vs. No. 6 Duke; ACC Tournament Semifinal | L 72–93 | 19–10 | Charlotte Coliseum; Charlotte, North Carolina |
NCAA Tournament
| Mar 14, 1991* | (6 E) | vs. (11 E) No. 25 Southern Miss; First Round | W 114–85 | 20–10 | Cole Fieldhouse; College Park, Maryland |
| Mar 16, 1991* | (6 E) | vs. (3 E) No. 14 Oklahoma State; Second Round | L 64–73 | 20–11 | Cole Fieldhouse; College Park, Maryland |
*Non-conference game. ^{#}Rankings from AP Poll. (#) Tournament seedings in parentheses. E=East. All times are in Eastern Time.

== NBA draft ==
| Round | Pick | Player | NBA club |
|---|---|---|---|
| 2 | 30 | Rodney Monroe | Atlanta Hawks |
| 2 | 36 | Chris Corchiani | Orlando Magic |
