= 1991 ACC men's basketball tournament =

- Classification: Division I
- Season: 1990–91
- Teams: 7
- Site: Charlotte, North Carolina; Charlotte Coliseum
- Champions: North Carolina (12th title)
- Winning coach: Dean Smith (11th title)
- MVP: Rick Fox (North Carolina)
- Television: Raycom Sports/Jefferson Pilot Sports, CBS (Championship Game)

1990–91 ACC men's basketball standings
	Conf.				Overall
Team	W		L	PCT	W		L	PCT
No. 6 Duke	11	–	3	.786	32	–	7	.821
No. 4 North Carolina †	10	–	4	.714	29	–	6	.829
Wake Forest	8	–	6	.571	19	–	11	.633
NC State	8	–	6	.571	20	–	11	.645
Georgia Tech	6	–	8	.429	17	–	13	.567
Virginia	6	–	8	.429	21	–	12	.636
Maryland	5	–	9	.357	16	–	12	.571
Clemson	2	–	12	.143	11	–	17	.393
† 1991 ACC tournament winner Rankings from AP poll

The 1991 Atlantic Coast Conference men's basketball tournament took place in Charlotte, North Carolina, at the second Charlotte Coliseum. North Carolina won the tournament, defeating Duke, 96–74, in the championship game. Rick Fox of North Carolina was named tournament MVP.

Maryland did not participate in the tournament because the program was on probation. Top seed Duke received a first-round bye into the semifinals. The only other times an ACC team opted out of the tournament were North Carolina in 1961, Syracuse in 2015, and Louisville in 2016 for similar reasons.

== Bracket ==
Quarterfinals; March 8
4	NC State	82
5	Georgia Tech	68
2	#7 North Carolina	67
7	Clemson	59
3	Wake Forest	66
6	Virginia	70

Semifinals; March 9
1	#6 Duke	93
4	NC State	72
2	#7 North Carolina	76
6	Virginia	71

Championship Game; March 10
1	#6 Duke	74
2	#7 North Carolina	96

AP rankings at time of tournament
