= 1990–91 Wake Forest Demon Deacons men's basketball team =

American college basketball season

1990–91 Wake Forest Demon Deacons men's basketball

NCAA tournament, second round
- Conference: Atlantic Coast Conference
- Record: 19–11 (8–6 ACC)
- Head coach: Dave Odom
- Assistant coaches: Larry Davis; Ricky Stokes; Jerry Wainwright
- Home arena: LJVM Coliseum

1990–91 ACC men's basketball standings
	Conf.				Overall
Team	W		L	PCT	W		L	PCT
No. 6 Duke	11	–	3	.786	32	–	7	.821
No. 4 North Carolina †	10	–	4	.714	29	–	6	.829
Wake Forest	8	–	6	.571	19	–	11	.633
NC State	8	–	6	.571	20	–	11	.645
Georgia Tech	6	–	8	.429	17	–	13	.567
Virginia	6	–	8	.429	21	–	12	.636
Maryland	5	–	9	.357	16	–	12	.571
Clemson	2	–	12	.143	11	–	17	.393
† 1991 ACC tournament winner Rankings from AP poll

The 1990–91 Wake Forest Demon Deacons men's basketball team represented Wake Forest University as a member of the Atlantic Coast Conference during the 1990–91 NCAA men's basketball season. The team was led by 2nd year head coach Dave Odom, and played their home games at LJVM Coliseum in Winston-Salem, North Carolina.

Wake Forest finished in a tie for third in the ACC regular season standings with an 8–6 conference record. The team lost to Virginia in the quarterfinal round of the ACC tournament. Despite the early exit from the conference tournament, the Demon Deacons received the No. 5 seed in the Southeast region of the NCAA tournament – the school's first appearance in seven years. The team defeated No. 12 seed Louisiana Tech before losing to No. 4 seed Alabama in the round of 32. This season formed the foundation of a school-record seven straight NCAA tournament appearances between 1991 and 1997.

Electrifying freshman Rodney Rogers was named ACC Rookie of the Year and head coach Dave Odom was named ACC Coach of Year for the first time.

== Previous season ==
Wake Forest finished in last place in the ACC regular season standings and were eliminated in the quarterfinals of the ACC tournament. In Coach Dave Odom's first season, the Demon Deacons had a record of 12–16 (3–11 ACC).

== Roster ==
1990–91 Wake Forest Demon Deacons men's basketball team
Players
Coaches

Pos.	#	Name	Height	Weight	Year	Previous school	Hometown
G	25	Marc Blucas	6 ft 3 in (1.91 m)	190 lb (86 kg)	Fr	Girard HS	Girard, PA
G	11	Charlie Harrison	6 ft 1 in (1.85 m)	165 lb (75 kg)	Fr	Archbishop Carroll	Washington, DC
F/C	21	Derrick Hicks	6 ft 9 in (2.06 m)	220 lb (100 kg)	So	Anderson JC	Raleigh, NC
G	22	Randolph Childress	6 ft 2 in (1.88 m)	175 lb (79 kg)	Fr	Flint Hill School	Clinton, MD
F	44	Chris King	6 ft 8 in (2.03 m)	215 lb (98 kg)	Jr	Hobbton HS	Newton Grove, NC
C	51	Stan King	7 ft 0 in (2.13 m)	252 lb (114 kg)	Fr	August Martin	Jamaica, NY
F	40	Trelonnie Owens	6 ft 8 in (2.03 m)	245 lb (111 kg)	Fr	Bladenboro HS	Bladenboro, NC
F	35	David Rasmussen	6 ft 7 in (2.01 m)	190 lb (86 kg)	So	Ricks JC	East Lansing, MI
F	54	Rodney Rogers	6 ft 7 in (2.01 m)	235 lb (107 kg)	Fr	Southern HS	Durham, NC
F	31	Anthony Tucker	6 ft 8 in (2.03 m)	220 lb (100 kg)	Jr	Georgetown; McKinley HS	Washington, D.C.

Head coach

- Dave Odom

Assistant coach(es)

- Larry Davis
- Ricky Stokes
- Jerry Wainwright

Legend

- (C) Team captain
- (S) Suspended
- (I) Ineligible
- (W) Walk-on
- Injured
- Current redshirt

Roster

== Schedule and results ==
Date time, TV	Rank^{#}	Opponent^{#}	Result	Record	Site city, state
Non-conference regular Season
Nov 23, 1990*		Howard	W 108–74	1–0	Lawrence Joel Coliseum; Winston-Salem, North Carolina
Nov 24, 1990*		Fairleigh Dickinson	W 67–55	2–0	Lawrence Joel Coliseum; Winston-Salem, North Carolina
Nov 27, 1990*		at No. 6 Alabama	L 95–96 ^{OT}	2–1	Coleman Coliseum; Tuscaloosa, Alabama
Dec 1, 1990*		at Tulane	W 81–79	3–1	Devlin Fieldhouse; New Orleans, Louisiana
Dec 6, 1990*		vs. Villanova	L 82–91	3–2	
Dec 8, 1990*		at Davidson	W 72–56	4–2	Johnston Gym; Davidson, North Carolina
Dec 22, 1990*		Richmond	W 82–56	5–2	Lawrence Joel Coliseum; Winston-Salem, North Carolina
ACC Regular Season
Jan 2, 1991		Maryland	W 74–62	6–2 (1–0)	Lawrence Joel Coliseum; Winston-Salem, North Carolina
Jan 6, 1991		at Georgia Tech	L 91–101	6–3 (1–1)	Alexander Memorial Coliseum; Atlanta, Georgia
Jan 9, 1991*		Colorado	L 72–89	6–4	Lawrence Joel Coliseum; Winston-Salem, North Carolina
Jan 12, 1991		at Clemson	W 93–88 ^{OT}	7–4 (2–1)	Littlejohn Coliseum; Clemson, South Carolina
Jan 14, 1991; 9:00 pm		at No. 14 Duke	L 67–89	7–5 (2–2)	Cameron Indoor Stadium; Durham, North Carolina
Jan 19, 1991		NC State	W 97–76	8–5 (3–2)	Lawrence Joel Coliseum; Winston-Salem, North Carolina
Jan 23, 1991		No. 7 North Carolina	L 81–91	8–6 (3–3)	Lawrence Joel Coliseum; Winston-Salem, North Carolina
Jan 28, 1991*		Miami (FL)	W 72–66	9–6	Lawrence Joel Coliseum; Winston-Salem, North Carolina
Jan 31, 1991*		Winthrop	W 71–48	10–6	Lawrence Joel Coliseum; Winston-Salem, North Carolina
Feb 2, 1991		at No. 15 Virginia	L 80–83	10–7 (3–4)	University Hall; Charlottesville, Virginia
Feb 6, 1991*; 7:30 pm		Bucknell	W 83–67	12–7	Lawrence Joel Coliseum; Winston-Salem, North Carolina
Feb 9, 1991		Georgia Tech	W 86–74	13–7	Lawrence Joel Coliseum; Winston-Salem, North Carolina
Feb 10, 1991		No. 11 Virginia	W 74–66	14–7	Lawrence Joel Coliseum; Winston-Salem, North Carolina
Feb 13, 1991		at No. 8 North Carolina	L 81–91	14–8	Dean Smith Center; Chapel Hill, North Carolina
Feb 16, 1991; 4:00 pm		No. 5 Duke	W 86–77	15–8	Lawrence Joel Coliseum; Winston-Salem, North Carolina
Feb 23, 1991		at Maryland	L 78–86	15–9	Cole Fieldhouse; College Park, Maryland
Feb 24, 1991		Clemson	W 81–55	16–9	Lawrence Joel Coliseum; Winston-Salem, North Carolina
Mar 2, 1991		at NC State	W 89–84	18–9 (10–6)	Reynolds Coliseum; Raleigh, North Carolina
ACC Tournament
Mar 8, 1991*		vs. Virginia; Quarterfinal	L 66–70	18–10	Charlotte Coliseum; Charlotte, North Carolina
NCAA Tournament
Mar 15, 1991*	(5 SE)	vs. (12 SE) Louisiana Tech; First Round	W 71–65	19–10	The Omni; Atlanta, Georgia
Mar 17, 1991*	(5 SE)	vs. (4 SE) No. 19 Alabama; Second Round	L 88–96	19–11	The Omni; Atlanta, Georgia
*Non-conference game. ^{#}Rankings from AP Poll. (#) Tournament seedings in parentheses. SE=Southeast. All times are in Eastern Time.

== Awards and honors ==
- Rodney Rogers – ACC Rookie of the Year
- Dave Odom – ACC Coach of the Year
