= 1990–91 North Carolina Tar Heels men's basketball team =

American college basketball season

1990–91 North Carolina Tar Heels men's basketball

ACC tournament champions

NCAA tournament, Final Four
- Conference: Atlantic Coast Conference

Ranking
- Coaches: No. 4
- AP: No. 4
- Record: 29–6 (10–4 ACC)
- Head coach: Dean Smith (29th season)
- Assistant coach: Bill Guthridge (23rd season)
- Home arena: Dean Smith Center

1990–91 ACC men's basketball standings
	Conf.				Overall
Team	W		L	PCT	W		L	PCT
No. 6 Duke	11	–	3	.786	32	–	7	.821
No. 4 North Carolina †	10	–	4	.714	29	–	6	.829
Wake Forest	8	–	6	.571	19	–	11	.633
NC State	8	–	6	.571	20	–	11	.645
Georgia Tech	6	–	8	.429	17	–	13	.567
Virginia	6	–	8	.429	21	–	12	.636
Maryland	5	–	9	.357	16	–	12	.571
Clemson	2	–	12	.143	11	–	17	.393
† 1991 ACC tournament winner Rankings from AP poll

The 1990–91 North Carolina Tar Heels men's basketball team represented the University of North Carolina at Chapel Hill.

Led by head coach Dean Smith, the Tar Heels achieved a top-five final ranking and reached the Final Four of the NCAA tournament.

== Roster ==
1990–91 North Carolina Tar Heels men's basketball team
Players
Coaches

Pos.	#	Name	Height	Weight	Year	Hometown
C	0	Eric Montross	7 ft 0 in (2.13 m)	270 lb (122 kg)	Fr	Indianapolis, Indiana
F	3	Pat Sullivan	6 ft 8 in (2.03 m)	—	Fr	Bogota, New Jersey
G	4	Kenny Harris	6 ft 1 in (1.85 m)	—	So	Petersburg, Virginia
G/F	5	Henrik Rodl	6 ft 7 in (2.01 m)	—	So	Heusenstamm, Germany
G	11	Scott Cherry	6 ft 4 in (1.93 m)	—	So	Ballston Spa, New York
G	14	Derrick Phelps	6 ft 4 in (1.93 m)	180 lb (82 kg)	Fr	Pleasantville, New York
G	21	King Rice	6 ft 0 in (1.83 m)	—	Sr	Binghamton, New York
F	31	Brian Reese	6 ft 6 in (1.98 m)	—	Fr	The Bronx, New York
F/C	32	Pete Chilcutt	6 ft 9 in (2.06 m)	230 lb (104 kg)	Sr	Eutaw, Alabama
F	33	Kevin Salvadori	7 ft 0 in (2.13 m)	—	Fr	Pittsburgh, Pennsylvania
F	34	George Lynch	6 ft 7 in (2.01 m)	215 lb (98 kg)	So	Roanoke, Virginia
G	40	Hubert Davis	6 ft 4 in (1.93 m)	185 lb (84 kg)	Jr	Burke, Virginia
F	44	Rick Fox	6 ft 7 in (2.01 m)	225 lb (102 kg)	Sr	Nassau, Bahamas
F	45	Clifford Rozier	6 ft 10 in (2.08 m)	—	Fr	Bradenton, Florida
C	55	Matt Wenstrom	7 ft 1 in (2.16 m)	250 lb (113 kg)	So	Katy, Texas

Head coach

- Dean Smith (Kansas)

Assistant coach(es)

- Bill Guthridge (Kansas State)

Legend

- (C) Team captain
- (S) Suspended
- (I) Ineligible
- (W) Walk-on
- Injured
- Current redshirt

== Schedule ==
Date time, TV	Rank^{#}	Opponent^{#}	Result	Record	Site city, state
Regular season
Nov 24, 1990*	No. 5	San Diego State	W 99–63	1–0	Dean Smith Center; Chapel Hill, NC
Nov 27, 1990*	No. 4	Jacksonville	W 104–61	2–0	Dean Smith Center; Chapel Hill, NC
Nov 30, 1990*	No. 4	vs. South Carolina; Diet Pepsi Tournament of Champions	L 74–76	2–1	Charlotte Coliseum; Charlotte, North Carolina
Dec 1, 1990*	No. 4	vs. Iowa State; Diet Pepsi Tournament of Champions	W 118–93	3–1	Charlotte Coliseum; Charlotte, North Carolina
Dec 6, 1990*	No. 10	No. 14 Connecticut	W 79–64	4–1	Dean Smith Center; Chapel Hill, NC
Dec 10, 1990*	No. 10	No. 25 Kentucky	W 84–81	5–1	Dean Smith Center; Chapel Hill, NC
Dec 15, 1990*	No. 9	No. 20 Alabama	W 95–79	6–1	Dean Smith Center; Chapel Hill, NC
Dec 22, 1990*	No. 8	at Purdue	W 86–74	7–1	Mackey Arena; West Lafayette, IN
Dec 29, 1990*	No. 7	vs. DePaul	W 90–75	8–1	Amway Arena; Orlando, Florida
Dec 30, 1990*	No. 7	vs. Stanford	W 71–60	9–1	Amway Arena; Orlando, Florida
Jan 3, 1991*	No. 7	at Cornell	W 108–64	10–1	Newman Arena; Ithaca, NY
Jan 5, 1991*	No. 7	vs. Notre Dame	W 82–47	11–1	Brendan Byrne Arena; East Rutherford, New Jersey
Jan 9, 1991	No. 5	Maryland	W 105–73	12–1 (1–0)	Dean Smith Center; Chapel Hill, NC
Jan 12, 1991	No. 5	at No. 13 Virginia	W 89–86	13–1 (2–0)	University Hall (University of Virginia); Charlottesville, VA
Jan 19, 1991	No. 5	at No. 12 Duke	L 60–74	13–2 (2–1)	Cameron Indoor Stadium; Durham, NC
Jan 23, 1991	No. 7	at Wake Forest	W 91–81	14–2 (3–1)	Lawrence Joel Coliseum; Winston-Salem, NC
Jan 27, 1991	No. 7	Georgia Tech	L 86–88	14–3 (3–2)	Dean Smith Center; Chapel Hill, NC
Jan 31, 1991	No. 9	at Clemson	W 90–77	15–3 (4–2)	Littlejohn Coliseum; Clemson, SC
Feb 6, 1991	No. 9	at NC State	L 91–97	15–4 (4–3)	Reynolds Coliseum; Raleigh, NC
Feb 7, 1991	No. 9	NC State	W 92–70	16–4 (5–3)	Dean Smith Center; Chapel Hill, NC
Feb 9, 1991	No. 9	No. 11 Virginia	W 77–58	17–4 (6–3)	Dean Smith Center; Chapel Hill, NC
Feb 13, 1991	No. 8	Wake Forest	W 85–70	18–4 (7–3)	Dean Smith Center; Chapel Hill, NC
Feb 16, 1991	No. 8	at Maryland	W 87–75	19–4 (8–3)	Cole Fieldhouse; College Park, MD
Feb 18, 1991*	No. 6	The Citadel	W 118–50	20–4	Dean Smith Center; Chapel Hill, NC
Feb 23, 1991	No. 6	Clemson	W 73–57	21–4 (9–3)	Dean Smith Center; Chapel Hill, NC
Feb 28, 1991	No. 4	at Georgia Tech	W 91–74	22–4 (10–3)	Alexander Memorial Coliseum; Atlanta, GA
Mar 3, 1991	No. 4	No. 8 Duke	L 77–83	22–5 (10–4)	Dean Smith Center; Chapel Hill, NC
ACC Tournament
Mar 8, 1991*	(2) No. 7	vs. (7) Clemson; Quarterfinals	W 67–59	23–5	Charlotte Coliseum; Charlotte, NC
Mar 9, 1991*	(2) No. 7	vs. (6) Virginia; Semifinals	W 76–71	24–5	Charlotte Coliseum; Charlotte, NC
Mar 10, 1991*	(2) No. 7	vs. (1) No. 6 Duke; Championship	W 96–74	25–5	Charlotte Coliseum; Charlotte, NC
NCAA Tournament
Mar 15, 1991*	(1 E) No. 4	vs. (16 E) Northeastern; First round	W 101–66	26–5	Carrier Dome; Syracuse, NY
Mar 17, 1991*	(1 E) No. 4	vs. (9 E) Villanova; Second Round	W 84–69	27–5	Carrier Dome; Syracuse, NY
Mar 22, 1991*	(1 E) No. 4	vs. (12 E) Eastern Michigan; Sweet Sixteen	W 93–67	28–5	Brendan Byrne Arena; East Rutherford, NJ
Mar 24, 1991*	(1 E) No. 4	vs. (10 E) Temple; Elite Eight	W 75–72	29–5	Brendan Byrne Arena; East Rutherford, NJ
Mar 30, 1991*	(1 E) No. 4	vs. (3 SE) No. 12 Kansas; Final Four	L 73–79	29–6	Hoosier Dome; Indianapolis, IN
*Non-conference game. ^{#}Rankings from AP Poll. (#) Tournament seedings in parentheses. E=East.
