= 1990–91 Georgia Tech Yellow Jackets men's basketball team =

American college basketball season

1990–91 Georgia Tech Yellow Jackets men's basketball

NCAA tournament, Round of 32
- Conference: Atlantic Coast Conference
- Record: 17–13 (6–8 ACC)
- Head coach: Bobby Cremins (10th season)
- Assistant coaches: Kevin Cantwell (5th season); Sherman Dillard (3rd season); Jimmy Hebron (10th season)
- Home arena: Alexander Memorial Coliseum

1990–91 ACC men's basketball standings
	Conf.				Overall
Team	W		L	PCT	W		L	PCT
No. 6 Duke	11	–	3	.786	32	–	7	.821
No. 4 North Carolina †	10	–	4	.714	29	–	6	.829
Wake Forest	8	–	6	.571	19	–	11	.633
NC State	8	–	6	.571	20	–	11	.645
Georgia Tech	6	–	8	.429	17	–	13	.567
Virginia	6	–	8	.429	21	–	12	.636
Maryland	5	–	9	.357	16	–	12	.571
Clemson	2	–	12	.143	11	–	17	.393
† 1991 ACC tournament winner Rankings from AP poll

The 1990–91 Georgia Tech Yellow Jackets men's basketball team represented the Georgia Institute of Technology during the 1990–91 NCAA men's basketball season. Led by 10th year head coach Bobby Cremins and point guard Kenny Anderson, the Yellow Jackets reached the second round of the NCAA tournament.

== Roster ==
1990–91 Georgia Tech Yellow Jackets men's basketball team
Players
Coaches

Pos.	#	Name	Height	Weight	Year	Hometown
G	12	Kenny Anderson	6 ft 2 in (1.88 m)	166 lb (75 kg)	So	Rego Park, New York
G	34	Rod Balanis	6 ft 3 in (1.91 m)	192 lb (87 kg)	Fr	Williamsburg, Virginia
F	15	Darryl Barnes	6 ft 8 in (2.03 m)	202 lb (92 kg)	So	Brooklyn, New York
G	14	Jon Barry	6 ft 4 in (1.93 m)	190 lb (86 kg)	Jr	Oakland, California
G	23	Brian Black	6 ft 1 in (1.85 m)	178 lb (81 kg)	Fr	Marietta, Georgia
G	3	Brian Domalik	5 ft 11 in (1.8 m)	164 lb (74 kg)	Sr	Leesburg, Virginia
G	10	James Gaddy	6 ft 3 in (1.91 m)	178 lb (81 kg)	So	Macon, Georgia
C	52	Matt Geiger	7 ft 0 in (2.13 m)	235 lb (107 kg)	Jr	Clearwater, Florida
G	41	Brian Gemberling	6 ft 5 in (1.96 m)	215 lb (98 kg)	Fr	Vero Beach, Florida
G	11	Bryan Hill	6 ft 4 in (1.93 m)	226 lb (103 kg)	So	Arlington, Virginia
F	32	Malcolm Mackey	6 ft 10 in (2.08 m)	243 lb (110 kg)	So	Chattanooga, Tennessee
C	24	James Munlyn	6 ft 11 in (2.11 m)	228 lb (103 kg)	Sr	Aiken, South Carolina
F	33	Ivano Newbill	6 ft 9 in (2.06 m)	224 lb (102 kg)	Fr	Macon, Georgia
G	14	Greg White	6 ft 2 in (1.88 m)	168 lb (76 kg)	Jr	Norcross, Georgia

Head coach

- Bobby Cremins (South Carolina)

Assistant coach(es)

- Kevin Cantwell
- Sherman Dillard
- Jimmy Hebron

Legend

- (C) Team captain
- (S) Suspended
- (I) Ineligible
- (W) Walk-on
- Injured
- Current redshirt

== Schedule ==
Date time, TV	Rank^{#}	Opponent^{#}	Result	Record	Site city, state
Non-conference regular season
Nov 24, 1990*	No. 16	Augusta State	W 100–63	1–0	Alexander Memorial Coliseum; Atlanta, Georgia
Nov 27, 1990*	No. 14	Morgan State	W 87–65	2–0	Alexander Memorial Coliseum; Atlanta, Georgia
Dec 1, 1990*	No. 14	at Richmond	L 71–73	2–1	Robins Center; Richmond, Virginia
Dec 5, 1990*	No. 20	vs. No. 17 St. John's; ACC-Big East Challenge	L 72–73 ^{OT}	2–2	Capital Centre; Landover, Maryland
Dec 8, 1990*	No. 20	Fordham	W 92–72	3–2	Alexander Memorial Coliseum; Atlanta, Georgia
Dec 15, 1990*	No. 23	at Temple	L 67–69	3–3	McGonigle Hall; Philadelphia, Pennsylvania
Dec 19, 1990*		No. 17 Georgia	W 112–105 ^{3OT}	4–3	Alexander Memorial Coliseum; Atlanta, Georgia
Dec 22, 1990*		Loyola Marymount	W 135–94	5–3	Alexander Memorial Coliseum; Atlanta, Georgia
Dec 27, 1990*		vs. Tulane	W 95–83	6–3	
Dec 28, 1990*		vs. Villanova	W 99–87	7–3	
Jan 2, 1991*	No. 24	Howard	W 84–77	8–3	Alexander Memorial Coliseum; Atlanta, Georgia
ACC Regular Season
Jan 6, 1991	No. 24	Wake Forest	W 101–91	9–3 (1–0)	Alexander Memorial Coliseum; Atlanta, Georgia
Jan 9, 1991; 9:00 pm	No. 24	at No. 14 Duke	L 57–98	9–4 (1–1)	Cameron Indoor Stadium; Durham, North Carolina
Jan 13, 1991	No. 24	at NC State	L 83–90	9–5 (1–2)	Reynolds Coliseum; Raleigh, North Carolina
Jan 19, 1991		No. 14 Virginia	W 78–51	10–5 (2–2)	Alexander Memorial Coliseum; Atlanta, Georgia
Jan 24, 1991		Clemson	W 89–68	11–5 (3–2)	Alexander Memorial Coliseum; Atlanta, Georgia
Jan 27, 1991		at No. 7 North Carolina	W 88–86	12–5 (4–2)	Dean Smith Center; Chapel Hill, North Carolina
Jan 30, 1991; 9:00 pm	No. 23	No. 7 Duke	L 75–77	12–6 (4–3)	Alexander Memorial Coliseum; Atlanta, Georgia
Feb 1, 1991	No. 23	Maryland	W 80–65	13–6 (5–3)	Alexander Memorial Coliseum; Atlanta, Georgia
Feb 3, 1991	No. 23	NC State	L 73–79	13–7 (5–4)	Alexander Memorial Coliseum; Atlanta, Georgia
Feb 9, 1991		at Wake Forest	L 74–86	13–8 (5–5)	Lawrence Joel Coliseum; Winston-Salem, North Carolina
Feb 13, 1991		at Maryland	L 93–96	13–9 (5–6)	Cole Fieldhouse; College Park, Maryland
Feb 17, 1991*		vs. No. 6 Arizona	W 62–56	14–9	Meadowlands Arena; East Rutherford, New Jersey
Feb 19, 1991		at No. 20 Virginia	W 73–60	15–9 (6–6)	University Hall; Charlottesville, Virginia
Feb 24, 1991*		Louisville	W 82–69	16–9	Alexander Memorial Coliseum; Atlanta, Georgia
Feb 28, 1991		No. 4 North Carolina	L 74–91	16–10 (6–7)	Alexander Memorial Coliseum; Atlanta, Georgia
Mar 2, 1991		at Clemson	L 62–69	16–11 (6–8)	Littlejohn Coliseum; Clemson, South Carolina
ACC tournament
Mar 8, 1991*		vs. NC State; Quarterfinal	L 68–82	16–12	Charlotte Coliseum; Charlotte, North Carolina
NCAA tournament
Mar 15, 1991*	(8 MW)	vs. (9 MW) No. 24 DePaul; First Round	W 87–70	17–12	UD Arena; Dayton, Ohio
Mar 17, 1991*	(8 MW)	vs. (1 MW) No. 5 Ohio State; Second Round	L 61–65	17–13	UD Arena; Dayton, Ohio
*Non-conference game. ^{#}Rankings from AP poll. (#) Tournament seedings in parentheses.

== Awards and honors ==
- Kenny Anderson – Consensus First-team All-American

== Players in the 1991 NBA draft ==
Round	Pick	Player	NBA club
1	2	Kenny Anderson	New Jersey Nets
