= 1990–91 Virginia Cavaliers men's basketball team =

American college basketball season

1990–91 Virginia Cavaliers men's basketball

NCAA tournament, Round of 64
- Conference: Atlantic Coast Conference
- Record: 21–12 (6–8 ACC)
- Head coach: Jeff Jones (1st season)
- Assistant coaches: Brian Ellerbe (1st season); Tom Perrin (4th season); Dennis Wolff (1st season)
- Home arena: University Hall

1990–91 ACC men's basketball standings
	Conf.				Overall
Team	W		L	PCT	W		L	PCT
No. 6 Duke	11	–	3	.786	32	–	7	.821
No. 4 North Carolina †	10	–	4	.714	29	–	6	.829
Wake Forest	8	–	6	.571	19	–	11	.633
NC State	8	–	6	.571	20	–	11	.645
Georgia Tech	6	–	8	.429	17	–	13	.567
Virginia	6	–	8	.429	21	–	12	.636
Maryland	5	–	9	.357	16	–	12	.571
Clemson	2	–	12	.143	11	–	17	.393
† 1991 ACC tournament winner Rankings from AP poll

The 1990–91 Virginia Cavaliers men's basketball team represented University of Virginia as a member of the Atlantic Coast Conference during the 1990–91 NCAA Division I men's basketball season. The team was led by first-year head coach Jeff Jones. The Cavaliers earned an at-large bid to the NCAA tournament as #7 seed in the West region. They were defeated in the opening round by BYU, 61–48. The Cavaliers finished with a record of 21–12 (6–8 ACC).

== Roster ==
1990–91 Virginia Cavaliers men's basketball team
Players
Coaches

Pos.	#	Name	Height	Weight	Year	Hometown
G	4	Terry Kirby	6 ft 3 in (1.91 m)	210 lb (95 kg)	So	Tabb, Virginia
G	5	Bernie Floriani	5 ft 10 in (1.78 m)	153 lb (69 kg)	Sr	Dover, Delaware
G	10	Anthony Oliver	6 ft 4 in (1.93 m)	188 lb (85 kg)	Jr	Faison, North Carolina
G	11	Doug Smith	6 ft 1 in (1.85 m)	175 lb (79 kg)	So	Fayetteville, Tennessee
F	12	Kenny Turner	6 ft 6 in (1.98 m)	232 lb (105 kg)	Sr	Indianapolis, Indiana
G	15	Chris Havlicek	6 ft 5 in (1.96 m)	194 lb (88 kg)	Fr	Weston, Massachusetts
G/F	20	Bryant Stith	6 ft 5 in (1.96 m)	204 lb (93 kg)	Jr	Emporia, Virginia
G	21	Derrick Johnson	6 ft 1 in (1.85 m)	163 lb (74 kg)	Fr	Plainfield, New Jersey
G	22	John Crotty	6 ft 1 in (1.85 m)	184 lb (83 kg)	Sr	Orange, New Jersey
G	23	Blair Ford	6 ft 2 in (1.88 m)	169 lb (77 kg)	So	Atlanta, Georgia
G/F	24	Dirk Katstra	6 ft 6 in (1.98 m)	212 lb (96 kg)	Sr	Stilwell, Kansas
F	30	Matt Blundin	6 ft 7 in (2.01 m)	232 lb (105 kg)	Sr	Ridley Township, Pennsylvania
G	31	Bobby Graves	6 ft 4 in (1.93 m)	191 lb (87 kg)	Fr	Herndon, Virginia
F/C	42	Ted Jeffries	6 ft 9 in (2.06 m)	238 lb (108 kg)	So	Bowie, Maryland
F	44	Corey Stewart	6 ft 7 in (2.01 m)	205 lb (93 kg)	Fr	Hampton, Virginia
F/C	52	Shawn Wilson	6 ft 11 in (2.11 m)	238 lb (108 kg)	Fr	Franklin, Tennessee

Head coach

- Jeff Jones

Assistant coach(es)

- Brian Ellerbe
- Tom Perrin
- Dennis Wolff

Legend

- (C) Team captain
- (S) Suspended
- (I) Ineligible
- (W) Walk-on
- Injured
- Current redshirt

Roster

== Schedule and results ==
Date time, TV	Rank^{#}	Opponent^{#}	Result	Record	Site (attendance) city, state
Regular season
Nov 23, 1990*	No. 18	vs. Siena; Great Alaska Shootout	W 80–77	1–0	Sullivan Arena; Anchorage, Alaska
Nov 24, 1990*	No. 18	vs. South Carolina; Great Alaska Shootout	W 65–59	2–0	Sullivan Arena; Anchorage, Alaska
Nov 26, 1990*	No. 18	vs. No. 11 UCLA; Great Alaska Shootout	L 74–89	2–1	Sullivan Arena; Anchorage, Alaska
Nov 30, 1990*	No. 16	New Orleans	L 55–60	2–2	University Hall; Charlottesville, Virginia
Dec 1, 1990*	No. 16	Winthrop	W 93–47	3–2	University Hall; Charlottesville, Virginia
Dec 3, 1990*	No. 21	vs. No. 13 Pittsburgh	W 84–80	4–2	Richmond Coliseum; Richmond, Virginia
Dec 8, 1990*	No. 21	Vanderbilt	W 70–56	5–2	University Hall; Charlottesville, Virginia
Dec 20, 1990*	No. 19	at Marshall	W 74–60	6–2	Cam Henderson Center; Huntington, West Virginia
Dec 29, 1990*	No. 19	at Minnesota	W 79–72	7–2	Williams Arena; Minneapolis, Minnesota
Jan 2, 1991*	No. 18	at Marquette	W 94–88	8–2	Bradley Center; Milwaukee, Wisconsin
Jan 5, 1991	No. 18	No. 8 Duke	W 81–64	9–2 (1–0)	University Hall; Charlottesville, Virginia
Jan 8, 1991	No. 13	at Clemson	W 82–78	10–2 (2–0)	Littlejohn Coliseum; Clemson, South Carolina
Jan 12, 1991	No. 13	No. 5 North Carolina	L 86–89	10–3 (2–1)	University Hall; Charlottesville, Virginia
Jan 16, 1991	No. 14	at Maryland	W 76–62	11–3 (3–1)	Cole Fieldhouse; College Park, Maryland
Jan 19, 1991	No. 14	at Georgia Tech	L 51–78	11–4 (3–2)	Alexander Memorial Coliseum; Atlanta, Georgia
Jan 21, 1991*	No. 18	Davidson	W 71–47	12–4	University Hall; Charlottesville, Virginia
Jan 23, 1991*	No. 18	vs. Virginia Tech	W 86–61	13–4	Richmond Coliseum; Richmond, Virginia
Jan 26, 1991*	No. 18	at Notre Dame	W 68–67	14–4	Joyce Center; Notre Dame, Indiana
Jan 29, 1991	No. 15	NC State	W 104–72	15–4 (4–2)	University Hall; Charlottesville, Virginia
Feb 2, 1991	No. 15	Wake Forest	W 83–80	16–4 (5–2)	University Hall; Charlottesville, Virginia
Feb 4, 1991*	No. 11	Radford	W 87–54	17–4	University Hall; Charlottesville, Virginia
Feb 7, 1991	No. 11	at No. 6 Duke	L 74–86	17–5 (5–3)	Cameron Indoor Stadium; Durham, North Carolina
Feb 9, 1991	No. 11	at No. 9 North Carolina	L 58–77	17–6 (5–4)	Dean Smith Center; Chapel Hill, North Carolina
Feb 10, 1991	No. 11	at Wake Forest	L 66–74	17–7 (5–5)	Lawrence Joel Coliseum; Winston-Salem, North Carolina
Feb 13, 1991*	No. 19	Fairfield	W 84–52	18–7	University Hall; Charlottesville, Virginia
Feb 16, 1991	No. 19	Clemson	W 57–47	19–7 (6–5)	University Hall; Charlottesville, Virginia
Feb 19, 1991	No. 20	Georgia Tech	L 60–73	19–8 (6–6)	University Hall; Charlottesville, Virginia
Feb 23, 1991	No. 20	at NC State	L 76–83	19–9 (6–7)	Reynolds Coliseum; Raleigh, North Carolina
Feb 25, 1991*	No. 25	Towson	W 72–49	20–9	University Hall; Charlottesville, Virginia
Mar 2, 1991	No. 25	Maryland	L 74–78	20–10 (6–8)	University Hall; Charlottesville, Virginia
ACC Tournament
Mar 8, 1991*		vs. Wake Forest; ACC Tournament Quarterfinal	W 70–66	21–10	Bojangles Coliseum; Charlotte, North Carolina
Mar 9, 1991*		vs. No. 7 North Carolina; ACC Tournament Semifinal	L 71–76	21–11	Bojangles Coliseum; Charlotte, North Carolina
NCAA tournament
Mar 14, 1991*	(7 W)	vs. (10 W) BYU; First Round	L 48–61	21–12	Jon M. Huntsman Center; Salt Lake City, Utah
*Non-conference game. ^{#}Rankings from AP poll. (#) Tournament seedings in parentheses. W=West. All times are in Eastern time.
