= 1989 CAA men's basketball tournament =

- Classification: Division I
- Season: 1988–89
- Teams: 8
- Site: Hampton Coliseum; Hampton, VA
- Champions: George Mason (1st title)
- Winning coach: Ernie Nestor (1st title)
- MVP: Kenny Sanders (George Mason)

1988–89 CAA men's basketball standings
	Conf.				Overall
Team	W		L	PCT	W		L	PCT
Richmond	13	–	1	.929	21	–	10	.677
George Mason †	10	–	4	.714	20	–	11	.645
American	9	–	5	.643	17	–	11	.607
UNC Wilmington	9	–	5	.643	16	–	14	.533
James Madison	6	–	8	.429	16	–	14	.533
East Carolina	6	–	8	.429	15	–	14	.517
William & Mary	2	–	12	.143	5	–	23	.179
Navy	1	–	13	.071	6	–	22	.214
† 1989 CAA tournament winner Rankings from AP Poll

The 1989 Colonial Athletic Association men's basketball tournament was held March 4–6 at the Hampton Coliseum in Hampton, Virginia.

George Mason defeated Richmond in the championship game, 78–72, to win their first CAA men's basketball tournament. The Patriots, therefore, earned an automatic bid to the 1989 NCAA tournament, their first-ever NCAA tournament bid.

== Bracket ==
Quarterfinals; Saturday, March 4
1	Richmond	96
8	Navy	86
5	James Madison	70
4	UNC Wilmington	80
3	American	58
6	East Carolina	76
7	William & Mary	72
2	George Mason	75

Semifinals; Sunday, March 5
1	Richmond	56
4	UNC Wilmington	59
6	East Carolina	58
2	George Mason	65

Championship; Monday, March 6
4	UNC Wilmington	72
2	George Mason	78
