= 1993 CAA men's basketball tournament =

- Classification: Division I
- Season: 1992–93
- Teams: 8
- Site: Richmond Coliseum; Richmond, Virginia
- Champions: East Carolina (1st title)
- Winning coach: Eddie Payne (1st title)
- MVP: Lester Lyons (East Carolina)

1992–93 CAA men's basketball standings
	Conf.				Overall
Team	W		L	PCT	W		L	PCT
James Madison	11	–	3	.786	21	–	9	.700
Old Dominion	11	–	3	.786	21	–	8	.724
Richmond	10	–	4	.714	15	–	12	.556
American	6	–	8	.429	11	–	17	.393
William & Mary	6	–	8	.429	14	–	13	.519
UNC Wilmington	6	–	8	.429	17	–	11	.607
East Carolina †	4	–	10	.286	13	–	17	.433
George Mason	2	–	12	.143	7	–	21	.250
† 1993 CAA tournament winner Rankings from AP Poll

The 1993 CAA men's basketball tournament was held March 6–8, 1993, at the Richmond Coliseum in Richmond, Virginia. The winner of the tournament was East Carolina, who received an automatic bid to the 1993 NCAA Men's Division I Basketball Tournament.

== Bracket ==
Quarterfinals, March 6
1	James Madison	60
8	George Mason	49
4	American	78
5	William & Mary	72
2	Old Dominion	67
7	East Carolina	73
3	Richmond	58
6	UNC-Wilmington	71

Semifinals, March 7
1	James Madison	70
4	American	61
7	East Carolina	55
6	UNC-Wilmington	50

Final, March 8
1	James Madison	49
7	East Carolina	54

== Honors ==
CAA All-Tournament Team	Player	School
CAA All-Tournament Team	Lester Lyons	East Carolina
CAA All-Tournament Team	Jeff Chambers	James Madison
CAA All-Tournament Team	Ike Copeland	East Carolina
CAA All-Tournament Team	William Davis	James Madison
CAA All-Tournament Team	Byran Edwards	James Madison
CAA All-Tournament Team	Brian Gilgeous	American
