= Frederick College =

Former college in Portsmouth, Virginia, United States

Frederick College was a former four-year private co-educational college from 1958 to 1968 in Portsmouth, Virginia.

The college was created in through a grant from the Fred W. Beazley Foundation (now the Beazley Foundation). It originally opened in 1958 as a two-year school on the grounds of a former munitions depot before becoming a four-year school in 1961. The school closed in 1968 and the land was given to the Virginia Community College System to form Tidewater Community College.

== Athletics ==
Nicknamed the Lions, Frederick competed at the NCAA small college level (now Division II) and had a 3600-seat football stadium. The coach of the men's basketball team was Bob Hodges. Behind the play of Tom Jasper, they won the Small College National Championship in the late 1960s. The school had a track team from 1961 to 1964 which was undefeated in the 1963–64 season and was coached by John Meroney.
