= Moussa Badiane =

French basketball player (born 1981)

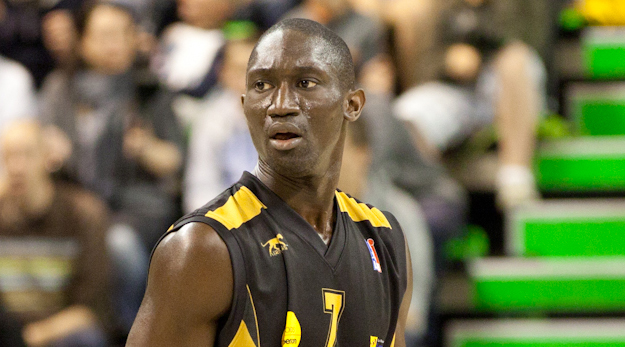
Moussa Badiane

Moussa Badiane (born 16 October 1981) is a French former professional basketball player.

== Professional career ==
During his pro career, Badiane played with the French club Antibes. He was the French 2nd Division French Player's MVP in 2010.
