= Ernie Nestor =

American basketball coach (1946–2025)

Biographical details
- Born: August 19, 1946
- Died: January 26, 2025 (aged 78)

Playing career
- 1968: Alderson–Broaddus

Coaching career (HC unless noted)
- 1970–1976: John D. Bassett HS
- 1976–1979: James Madison (assistant)
- 1979–1985: Wake Forest (assistant)
- 1985–1988: California (assistant)
- 1988–1993: George Mason
- 1993–2001: Wake Forest (assistant)
- 2001–2003: South Carolina (assistant)
- 2003–2009: Elon
- 2009–2010: New Jersey Nets (scout)
- 2010–2011: Penn State (assistant)
- 2011–2012: Missouri (assistant)
- 2012–2017: Navy (assistant)

Head coaching record
- Overall: 135–198
- Tournaments: 0–1 (NCAA Division I)

Accomplishments and honors

Championships
- CAA tournament (1989); SoCon North Division (2006)

Awards
- SoCon Coach of the Year (2006)

Ernie Nestor (August 19, 1946 – January 26, 2025) was an American college basketball coach, formerly an assistant coach at the University of Missouri. Head coach Frank Haith named Nestor to this post in April, 2011. He was formerly the head coach of the Elon University and George Mason men's basketball teams. Nestor, a native of Philippi, West Virginia, was a long-time assistant at Wake Forest University, including an eight-year stint for head coach Dave Odom. He was also on the coaching staffs of California, James Madison and South Carolina during his career.

== Life and career ==
Nestor was born on August 19, 1946. He began his head coaching career at John D. Bassett High School in Bassett, Virginia, where he coached from 1970 to 1976. For 14 seasons (1979–1985, 1993–2001) Nestor served as a Wake Forest assistant; Odom was the head coach during his second of two stints. The Demon Deacons won two Atlantic Coast Conference men's basketball tournament titles (1995 and 1996), and reached the final eight of the 1996 NCAA Division I men's basketball tournament in his time there. In addition, the team won the National Invitation Tournament in 2000. The U.S. 1996 William Jones Cup team was coached by Nestor.

From May 12, 1988, to March 8, 1993, Nestor was head coach at George Mason University.

In 1989, George Mason gained an NCAA Tournament berth under Nestor by winning the Colonial Athletic Association's postseason tournament; it was the first NCAA Tournament participation for the program. After losing in the first round of the NCAA tournament to Indiana, the Patriots finished the year 20–11. The 1990 team also reached the 20-victory plateau. He resigned after five years and a 68–81 record at George Mason before joining Odom on his staff at Wake Forest in 1993.

Nestor's 2008 Elon team, the seventh seed in the Southern Conference postseason tournament, made it to the finals, where Davidson defeated them. In 2009, he resigned (or was fired) after six seasons at the helm for Elon. He served as a scout for the NBA's New Jersey Nets from 2009 to 2010 before returning to the college ranks as Director of Basketball Operations for Penn State for the 2010–11 season.

After one season, Nestor left the Missouri program to take an assistant coaching position at Navy.

Nestor died on January 26, 2025, at the age of 78.

== Head coaching record ==
=== College ===
Record table
Season	Team	Overall	Conference	Standing	Postseason
George Mason Patriots (Colonial Athletic Association) (1988–1993)
1988–89	George Mason	20–11	10–4	2nd	NCAA Division I First Round
1989–90	George Mason	20–12	10–4	T–2nd	
1990–91	George Mason	14–16	8–6	T–3rd	
1991–92	George Mason	7–21	3–11	T–7th	
1992–93	George Mason	7–21	2–12	8th	
George Mason:		68–81 (.456)	33–37 (.471)		
Elon Phoenix (Southern Conference) (2003–2009)
2003–04	Elon	12–18	7–9	T–3rd (North)	
2004–05	Elon	8–23	5–11	4th (North)	
2005–06	Elon	15–14	10–4	1st (North)	
2006–07	Elon	7–23	5–13	5th (North)	
2007–08	Elon	14–19	5–11	4th (North)	
2008–09	Elon	11–20	7–13	5th (North)	
Elon:		67–117 (.364)	39–61 (.390)		
Total:		135–198 (.405)			
National champion Postseason invitational champion Conference regular season champion Conference regular season and conference tournament champion Division regular season champion Division regular season and conference tournament champion Conference tournament champion
