= Jim Gregory (basketball) =

American former basketball player (born 1949

James M. Gregory
Personal information
- Born: July 25, 1949 (age 77) West Virginia, U.S.
- Listed height: 6 ft 7 in (2.01 m)

Career information
- High school: Gary (Gary, West Virginia)
- College: East Carolina (1968–1971)
- NBA draft: 1971: undrafted
- Position: Forward

Career highlights
- SoCon Co-Player of the Year (1971); First-team All-SoCon (1971)

James M. Gregory (born July 25, 1949) is an American former basketball player. He is known for his collegiate career playing for the Pirates at East Carolina University from 1968–69 to 1970–71. In three seasons he scored 1,193 points, grabbed 852 rebounds and was named the Southern Conference Co-Player of the Year as a senior. Gregory averaged a team-leading 18.3 points per game as well as 11.5 rebounds per game that season en route to sharing the award with William & Mary's Tom Jasper.

Although the Pirates never won a conference championship nor participated in any postseason tournaments during his career, Gregory was part of a unique historical oddity during his junior season in 1969–70: the three starting frontcourt players all averaged double-doubles for the year. Additionally, each of them shared the same first name: Jim Gregory (forward), Jim Fairley (forward), and Jim Modlin (center). Their point-rebound averages were, respectively: 16.5/10.4, 16.7/12.1, and 18.5/10.5. It is believed that this may be the only occurrence in National Collegiate Athletic Association history in which three teammates each averaged point-rebound double-doubles during the same season.

After college, the Memphis Pros of the American Basketball Association selected him in the 10th round of the 1971 ABA Draft, but Gregory never played in the league. Gregory was later inducted into the East Carolina Hall of Fame as part of their 1982 induction class. For his career, he averaged a double-double of 15.5 points and 11.1 rebounds per game (the latter is tied for first all-time in school history).
