= Tom Jasper =

American basketball player

Personal information
- Born: November 21, 1948 (age 77)

Career information
- College: Frederick College (1967–1969); William & Mary (1969–1971)
- NBA draft: 1971: undrafted
- Position: Forward

Career highlights
- Small College national champion (1969); SoCon Co-Player of the Year (1971); First-team all-SoCon (1971)

Thomas D. Jasper (born November 21, 1948) is an American former basketball player notable for his collegiate career at the College of William & Mary. After spending his first two seasons at then-Division II (and now defunct) Frederick College, in which he led them to a Small College National Championship as a sophomore, Jasper transferred to William & Mary in 1969 and played for head coach Warren Mitchell.

== William & Mary ==
In Jasper's two seasons with the Tribe, he scored 982 points in 54 career games. Through 2011–12, his 18.2 points per game career average is the fifth highest all-time at William & Mary. In his senior season in 1970–71, Jasper averaged 19.8 points and 8.6 rebounds per game, both of which led the team. His scoring also paced the Southern Conference. That season, Jasper earned a First Team All-SoCon selection, was named to the All-SoCon tournament Team and was also named the SoCon Co-Player of the Year with East Carolina's Jim Gregory. He became the second men's basketball conference player of the year in school history after Jeff Cohen earned the honor in 1961. He never played professionally after graduating, however.

== Later life ==
As of October 2025, Jasper is serving as senior vice president of Schmitz Press, in Sparks, Maryland.
