= 1992–93 East Carolina Pirates men's basketball team =

American college basketball season

1992–93 East Carolina Pirates men's basketball

CAA tournament champions

NCAA tournament, first round
- Conference: Colonial Athletic Association
- Record: 13–17 (4–10 CAA)
- Head coach: Eddie Payne (2nd season)
- Home arena: Williams Arena

1992–93 CAA men's basketball standings
	Conf.				Overall
Team	W		L	PCT	W		L	PCT
James Madison	11	–	3	.786	21	–	9	.700
Old Dominion	11	–	3	.786	21	–	8	.724
Richmond	10	–	4	.714	15	–	12	.556
American	6	–	8	.429	11	–	17	.393
William & Mary	6	–	8	.429	14	–	13	.519
UNC Wilmington	6	–	8	.429	17	–	11	.607
East Carolina †	4	–	10	.286	13	–	17	.433
George Mason	2	–	12	.143	7	–	21	.250
† 1993 CAA tournament winner Rankings from AP Poll

The 1992–93 East Carolina Pirates men's basketball team represented East Carolina University during the 1992–93 NCAA Division I men's basketball season. The Pirates, led by second-year head coach Eddie Payne, played their home games at Williams Arena at Minges Coliseum and were members of the Colonial Athletic Association (CAA). They finished the season 13–17, 4–10 in CAA play to finish in seventh place. They won the CAA tournament to receive the conference's automatic bid to the 1993 NCAA tournament. As No. 16 seed in the East region, the Pirates were beaten in the opening round by No. 1 seed and eventual National champion North Carolina, 85–65.

== Roster ==
1992–93 East Carolina Pirates men's basketball team
Players
Coaches

Pos.	#	Name	Height	Weight	Year	Hometown
F		Anton Gill	6 ft 8 in (2.03 m)	—	So
G		Lester Lyons	6 ft 3 in (1.91 m)	—	Jr
G		Ronnell Peterson	6 ft 1 in (1.85 m)	—	Sr

Head coach

- Eddie Payne

Assistant coach(es)

Legend

- (C) Team captain
- (S) Suspended
- (I) Ineligible
- (W) Walk-on
- Injured
- Current redshirt

== Schedule ==
Date time, TV	Rank^{#}	Opponent^{#}	Result	Record	Site (attendance) city, state
Regular season
Dec 8, 1992*		UNC Charlotte	L 59–62	0–1	Williams Arena at Minges Coliseum; Greenville, North Carolina
Dec 12, 1992*		Tennessee Tech	W 109–94	1–1	Williams Arena at Minges Coliseum; Greenville, North Carolina
Dec 18, 1992*		vs. Southeastern Louisiana	W 72–65	2–1	John F. Savage Hall; Toledo, Ohio
Dec 19, 1992*		at Toledo	W 72–61	3–1	John F. Savage Hall; Toledo, Ohio
Dec 22, 1992*		at Colorado State	L 66–78	3–2	Moby Arena; Fort Collins, Colorado
Dec 30, 1992*		at Tennessee Tech	L 77–95	3–3	Eblen Center; Cookeville, Tennessee
Jan 2, 1993*		at Virginia Tech	L 67–76	3–4	Cassell Coliseum; Blacksburg, Virginia
Jan 4, 1993*		at Appalachian State	L 74–76	3–5	Varsity Gymnasium; Boone, North Carolina
CAA tournament
Mar 6, 1993*		vs. Old Dominion; Quarterfinals	W 73–67	11–16	Richmond Coliseum; Richmond, Virginia
Mar 7, 1993*		vs. UNC Wilmington; Semifinals	W 55–50	12–16	Richmond Coliseum; Richmond, Virginia
Mar 8, 1993*		vs. James Madison; Championship game	W 54–49	13–16	Richmond Coliseum; Richmond, Virginia
1993 NCAA tournament
Mar 18, 1993*	(16 E)	vs. (1 E) No. 4 North Carolina; First Round	L 65–85	13–17	Lawrence Joel Coliseum; Winston-Salem, North Carolina
*Non-conference game. ^{#}Rankings from AP Poll. (#) Tournament seedings in parentheses. E=East. All times are in Eastern Time.
