= 1988–89 East Carolina Pirates men's basketball team =

American college basketball season

1988–89 East Carolina Pirates men's basketball
- Conference: Colonial Athletic Association
- Record: 15–14 (6–8 CAA)
- Head coach: Mike Steele (2nd season)
- Home arena: Williams Arena at Minges Coliseum

1988–89 CAA men's basketball standings
	Conf.				Overall
Team	W		L	PCT	W		L	PCT
Richmond	13	–	1	.929	21	–	10	.677
George Mason †	10	–	4	.714	20	–	11	.645
American	9	–	5	.643	17	–	11	.607
UNC Wilmington	9	–	5	.643	16	–	14	.533
James Madison	6	–	8	.429	16	–	14	.533
East Carolina	6	–	8	.429	15	–	14	.517
William & Mary	2	–	12	.143	5	–	23	.179
Navy	1	–	13	.071	6	–	22	.214
† 1989 CAA tournament winner Rankings from AP Poll

The 1988–89 East Carolina Pirates men's basketball team represented East Carolina University during the 1988–89 NCAA Division I basketball season. The Pirates were led by second year coach Mike Steele and they finished sixth in CAA with a record of 15–14, 6–8.

Guard Blue Edwards was the team's leading scorer with 26.7 points and 6.2 rebounds in 27 games. Other statistical leaders included Senior guard Jeff Kelly with 4.1 assists.

== Schedule ==
Date time, TV	Rank^{#}	Opponent^{#}	Result	Record	Site (attendance) city, state
Non-conference regular season
Nov 26, 1988*		NC Wesleyan	W 91–65	1–0	Williams Arena at Minges Coliseum; Greenville, NC
Nov 28, 1988*		UNC Greensboro	W 68–49	2–0	Williams Arena at Minges Coliseum; Greenville, NC
Nov 30, 1988*		at No. 1 Duke	L 46–95	2–1	Cameron Indoor Stadium; Durham, North Carolina
Dec 3, 1988*		Campbell	W 86–72	3–1	Williams Arena at Minges Coliseum; Greenville, NC
Dec 7, 1988*		at South Carolina	L 67–75	3–2	Carolina Coliseum; Columbia, South Carolina
Dec 10, 1988*		Radford	L 75–88	3–3	Williams Arena at Minges Coliseum; Greenville, NC
Dec 15, 1988*		at Winthrop	W 75–67	4–3	Winthrop Coliseum; Rock Hill, South Carolina
Dec 20, 1988*		at Mississippi State	L 79–88	4–4	Humphrey Coliseum; Starkville, Mississippi
Dec 27, 1988*		Maryland-Baltimore County	W 97–78	5–4	Williams Arena at Minges Coliseum; Greenville, NC
Dec 30, 1988*		TCU	W 80–74	6–4	Williams Arena at Minges Coliseum; Greenville, NC
Jan 4, 1989*		at No. 19 Georgia Tech	L 69–92	6–5	Alexander Memorial Coliseum; Atlanta, Georgia
CAA regular season
Jan 7, 1989		at William & Mary	W 75–59	7–5 (1–0)	Kaplan Arena at William and Mary Hall; Williamsburg, Virginia
Jan 11, 1989		at Richmond	L 56–83	7–6 (1–1)	Robins Center; Richmond, Virginia
Jan 14, 1989		James Madison	W 62–57	8–6 (2–1)	Williams Arena at Minges Coliseum; Greenville, NC
Jan 16, 1989		George Mason	L 74–86	8–7 (2–2)	Williams Arena at Minges Coliseum; Greenville, NC
Jan 21, 1989		at American	L 68–82	8–8 (2–3)	Bender Arena; Washington, D.C.
Jan 23, 1989		vs. Navy	W 70–63	9–8 (3–3)	Halsey Field House; Annapolis, Maryland
Jan 28, 1989		vs. North Carolina-Wilmington	L 66–81	9–9 (3–4)	Trask Coliseum; Wilmington, NC
Feb 1, 1989		William & Mary	W 73–68	10–9 (4–4)	Williams Arena at Minges Coliseum; Greenville, NC
Feb 4, 1989		Richmond	L 54–56	10–10 (4–5)	Williams Arena at Minges Coliseum; Greenville, NC
Feb 8, 1989		at George Mason	L 65–83	10–11 (4–6)	Patriot Center; Fairfax, Virginia
Feb 11, 1989		at James Madison	L 61–74	10–12 (4–7)	JMU Convocation Center; Harrisonburg, Virginia
Feb 16, 1989*		at Campbell	W 65–60	11–12 (5–7)	Carter Gymnasium; Buies Creek, North Carolina
Feb 18, 1989		American	W 66–60	12–12 (6–7)	Williams Arena at Minges Coliseum; Greenville, NC
Feb 20, 1989		Navy	W 67–58	13–12 (7–7)	Williams Arena at Minges Coliseum; Greenville, NC
Feb 22, 1989*		Liberty	W 69–60	14–12 (8–7)	Williams Arena at Minges Coliseum; Greenville, NC
Feb 25, 1989		North Carolina-Wilmington	L 55–60	14–13 (8–8)	Williams Arena at Minges Coliseum; Greenville, NC
CAA tournament
Mar 4, 1989	(6)	vs. (3) American; Quarterfinals	W 76–58	15–13 (8–8)	Hampton Coliseum; Hampton, Virginia
Mar 5, 1989	(6)	vs. No. 2 George Mason; Semifinals	L 58–65	15–14 (8–8)	Hampton Coliseum; Hampton, Virginia
*Non-conference game. ^{#}Rankings from AP Poll. (#) Tournament seedings in parentheses. All times are in Eastern Time.

== Team players in the 1989 NBA draft ==
Round	Pick	Player	NBA club
1	21	Blue Edwards	Utah Jazz
