= Eddie Payne =

American basketball player-coach (1951–2021)

Biographical details
- Born: July 10, 1951; Charlotte, North Carolina, U.S.
- Died: July 7, 2021 (aged 69)

Playing career
- 1969–1973: Wake Forest

Coaching career (HC unless noted)
- 1976–1978: Clemson (assistant)
- 1978–1979: Truett McConnell
- 1979–1981: East Carolina (assistant)
- 1981–1986: Belmont Abbey
- 1986–1991: South Carolina (assistant)
- 1991–1995: East Carolina
- 1995–2000: Oregon State
- 2000–2002: Greensboro
- 2002–2017: USC Upstate

Head coaching record
- Overall: 484–474
- Tournaments: 0–1 (NCAA Division I); 2–4 (CIT); 1–2 (NCAA Division II)

Accomplishments and honors

Championships
- CAA tournament (1993); Peach Belt regular season (2005); Peach Belt tournament (2006)

Awards
- Hugh Durham Award (2012); Peach Belt Coach of the Year (2005); Atlantic Sun Coach of the Year (2012); NABC DII South Atlantic Region Coach of the Year (2005)

Edward G. Payne (July 10, 1951 – July 7, 2021) was an American college basketball coach and the head men's basketball coach at the University of South Carolina Upstate. Payne led the USC Upstate Spartans through their first season of Division I competition in 2007–2008. In 2012, he was named the Atlantic Sun Conference Coach of the Year. Prior to arriving at USC Upstate, Payne was a Div I head coach at Oregon State University and East Carolina University. Payne's son, Luke, was one of his assistant coaches at USC Upstate from 2012 to 2015. Payne announced his retirement from USC Upstate on October 3, 2017, citing complications from ankle surgeries in the off-season. He died in 2021, due to complications of a stroke at the age of 69

== Head coaching record ==
Record table
Season	Team	Overall	Conference	Standing	Postseason
Truett-McConnell Bears () (1978–1979)
1978–79	Truett-McConnell	25–5			
Truett-McConnell:		25–5 (.833)			
Belmont Abbey Crusaders () (1981–1986)
1981–82	Belmont Abbey	17–10			
1982–83	Belmont Abbey	15–14			
1983–84	Belmont Abbey	26–11			
1984–85	Belmont Abbey	21–10			
1985–86	Belmont Abbey	24–6			
Belmont Abbey:		103–51 (.669)			
East Carolina Pirates (Colonial Athletic Association) (1991–1995)
1991–92	East Carolina	10–18	4–10	6th	
1992–93	East Carolina	13–17	4–10	7th	NCAA Division I First Round
1993–94	East Carolina	15–12	7–8	5th	
1994–95	East Carolina	18–11	7–8	4th	
East Carolina:		56–58 (.491)	22–36 (.379)		
Oregon State Beavers (Pacific-10 Conference) (1995–2000)
1995–96	Oregon State	6–21	4–14	9th	
1996–97	Oregon State	7–20	3–15	9th	
1997–98	Oregon State	13–17	3–15	T–9th	
1998–99	Oregon State	13–14	7–11	T–7th	
1999–00	Oregon State	13–16	5–13	T–8th	
Oregon State:		52–88 (.371)	22–68 (.244)		
Greensboro Pride (Dixie Conference) (2000–2002)
2000–01	Greensboro	10–16	4–8	5th	
2001–02	Greensboro	11–15	6–8	5th	
Greensboro:		21–31 (.404)	10–16 (.385)		
USC Spartanburg / USC Upstate Spartans (Peach Belt Conference) (2002–2007)
2002–03	USC Spartanburg	18–11	11–8	2nd (North)	
2003–04	USC Spartanburg	14–14	7–9	3rd (North)	
2004–05	USC Upstate	24–8	13–3	1st (North)	NCAA Division II Second Round
2005–06	USC Upstate	20–10	12–8	5th	NCAA Division II First Round
2006–07	USC Upstate	17–11	9–7	2nd (North)	
USC Upstate:		93–54 (.633)	52–35 (.598)		
USC Upstate Spartans (Atlantic Sun Conference) (2007–2017)
2007–08	USC Upstate	7–23	5–11	T–10th	
2008–09	USC Upstate	9–21	8–12	8th	
2009–10	USC Upstate	6–23	6–14	9th	
2010–11	USC Upstate	5–25	4–16	11th	
2011–12	USC Upstate	21–13	13–5	T–2nd	CIT Second Round
2012–13	USC Upstate	16–17	9–9	T–4th	
2013–14	USC Upstate	19–15	11–7	3rd	CIT First Round
2014–15	USC Upstate	24–12	8–6	3rd	CIT Second Round
2015–16	USC Upstate	10–22	4–10	T–7th	
2016–17	USC Upstate	17–16	7–7	T–4th	CIT First Round
USC Upstate:		134–187 (.417)	75–97 (.436)		
Total:		484–474 (.505)			
National champion Postseason invitational champion Conference regular season champion Conference regular season and conference tournament champion Division regular season champion Division regular season and conference tournament champion Conference tournament champion
