= 1991 National Invitation Tournament =

College basketball tournament in the United States

- Season: 1990–91
- Teams: 32
- Finals site: Madison Square Garden, New York City
- Champions: Stanford Cardinal (1st title)
- Runner-up: Oklahoma Sooners (1st title game)
- Semifinalists: Colorado Buffaloes (3rd semifinal); UMass Minutemen (1st semifinal)
- Winning coach: Mike Montgomery (1st title)
- MVP: Adam Keefe (Stanford)

The 1991 National Invitation Tournament was the 1991 edition of the annual NCAA college basketball competition. This tournament adopted the tenths-second game clock in the final minute of every period.

== Selected teams ==
Below is a list of the 32 teams selected for the tournament.

Team	Conference	Overall record	Appearance	Last bid
Arkansas State	American South	21–8	4th	1989
Ball State	MAC	21–9	1st	Never
Boise State	Big Sky	18–10	3rd	1989
Bowling Green	MAC	17–12	10th	1990
Butler	Midwestern Collegiate	18–10	4th	1989
Cincinnati	Metro	17–11	8th	1990
Colorado	Big Eight	15–13	3rd	1940
Coppin State	MEAC	19–10	1st	Never
Fairleigh Dickinson	Northeast	22–8	1st	Never
Fordham	Patriot	24–7	16th	1990
Furman	SoCon	20–8	1st	Never
George Washington	Atlantic 10	19–11	1st	Never
Houston	Southwest	18–10	5th	1988
James Madison	CAA	19–9	3rd	1990
La Salle	MAAC	19–9	11th	1987
Memphis State	Metro	16–14	11th	1990
Michigan	Big Ten	14–14	5th	1984
Oklahoma	Big Eight	16–14	4th	1982
Providence	Big East	17–12	11th	1986
Rice	Southwest	16–13	2nd	1943
Siena	MAAC	23–9	2nd	1988
South Carolina	Metro	19–12	5th	1983
South Florida	Sun Belt	19–10	4th	1985
Southern Illinois	Missouri Valley	16–13	6th	1990
Southwest Missouri State	Missouri Valley	21–11	2nd	1986
Stanford	Pac-10	15–13	3rd	1990
Tulsa	Missouri Valley	18–11	6th	1990
UAB	Sun Belt	18–12	3rd	1989
UMass	Atlantic 10	17–11	8th	1990
West Virginia	Atlantic 10	16–13	9th	1988
Wisconsin	Big Ten	14–14	2nd	1989
Wyoming	WAC	19–11	4th	1986

== Bracket ==
Below are the four first round brackets, along with the four-team championship bracket.

First Round
Providence	98
James Madison	93
West Virginia	86
Furman	67
Cincinnati	82
Ball State	55
Oklahoma	111
Tulsa	86

Second Round
Providence	85
West Virginia	79
Cincinnati	81
Oklahoma	89

Quarterfinals
Providence	74
Oklahoma	83

First Round
Colorado	71
Michigan	64
Wyoming	63
Butler	61
Memphis State	82
UAB	76
Arkansas State	78
Rice	71

Second Round
Colorado	83
Wyoming	75
Memphis	57
Arkansas State	58

Quarterfinals
Colorado	81
Arkansas State	75

First Round
UMass	93
La Salle	90
Fordham	76
South Florida	66
South Carolina	69
George Washington	63
Siena	90
Fairleigh Dickinson	85

Second Round
UMass	78
Fordham	74
South Carolina	58
Siena	63

Quarterfinals
UMass	82
Siena	80

First Round
Southern Illinois	75
Boise State	74
SW Missouri State	57
Coppin State	47
Wisconsin	87
Bowling Green	79
Stanford	93
Houston	86

Second Round
Southern Illinois	72
SW Missouri State	69
Wisconsin	72
Stanford	80

Quarterfinals
Southern Illinois	68
Stanford	78

=== Semifinals & finals ===
Semifinals
Oklahoma	88
Colorado	78
UMass	71
Stanford	78

Finals
Oklahoma	72
Stanford	78

Third place game
Colorado	98
UMass	91

== See also ==
- 1991 National Women's Invitational Tournament
- 1991 NCAA Division I men's basketball tournament
- 1991 NCAA Division II men's basketball tournament
- 1991 NCAA Division III men's basketball tournament
- 1991 NCAA Division I women's basketball tournament
- 1991 NCAA Division II women's basketball tournament
- 1991 NCAA Division III women's basketball tournament
- 1991 NAIA men's basketball tournament
- 1991 NAIA women's basketball tournament
