= 1991 NAIA men's basketball tournament =

College basketball tournament

- Teams: 32
- Finals site: Kemper Arena; Kansas City, Missouri
- Champions: Oklahoma City (1 title, 1 title game, 1 Fab Four)
- Runner-up: Central Arkansas (1 title game, 2 Fab Four)
- Semifinalists: Taylor (1 Final Four); Pfeiffer (1 Final Four)
- Charles Stevenson Hustle Award: David Wayne (Taylor)
- Chuck Taylor MVP: Eric Manuel (Oklahoma City)

The 1991 NAIA men's basketball tournament was held in March at Kemper Arena in Kansas City, Missouri. The 54th annual NAIA basketball tournament featured 32 teams playing in a single-elimination format. Oklahoma City became the champions after winning the final against Central Arkansas 77–74.

== Awards and honors ==
- Leading scorers:
- Leading rebounder:
- Player of the Year: est. 1994.

== Bracket ==
First round	Second round
1	Wisconsin–Eau Claire	78
–	Maine-Machias	49
1	Wisconsin Eau Claire	55
16	Westmont	52*
16	Westmont	65
–	Emporia State	55
TOP TIER
9	Taylor	68
–	Francis Marion	47
9	Taylor	60
–	Northern State (SD)	59
–	Northern State (SD)	80
8	Georgia Southwestern State	67
5	Central Arkansas	75
–	Olivet Nazarene	66
5	Central Arkansas	99
12	Rio Grande	67
12	Rio Grande	111
–	Campbellsville	92
TOP TIER
13	Athens State	86
–	Whitworth	65
13	Athens State	62
4	Minnesota Duluth	56*
4	Minnesota–Duluth	76
–	Xavier (LA)	68
3	Lipscomb	106
–	Holy Family	75
3	Lipscomb	89
14	Briar Cliff	87
14	Briar Cliff	72
–	Park	60
BOTTOM TIER
11	St. Mary's (TX)	96
–	Hawaii Loa	94*
11	St. Mary’s (TX)	71
6	Pfeiffer	83
6	Pfeiffer	96
–	Saint Vincent	82
–	St. Mary’s (MI)	77
7	Wayland Baptist	68
–	St. Mary’s (MI)	83
10	College of Idaho	96
10	College of Idaho	96
–	Saint Rose	91**
BOTTOM TIER
15	Concord (WV)	106
–	Southern Colorado	91
15	Concord (WV)	85
2	Oklahoma City	107
2	Oklahoma City	80
–	Concordia (NE)	77

Elite Eight
1	Wisconsin Eau Claire	57
9	Taylor	64
5	Central Arkansas	95
13	Athens State	64
3	Lipscomb	95
6	Pfeiffer	96
–	St. Mary’s (MI)	94
2	Oklahoma City	112

NAIA national semifinals
9	Taylor	60
5	Central Arkansas	60
6	Pfeiffer	83
2	Oklahoma City	100

NAIA national championship
5	Central Arkansas	74
2	Oklahoma City	77

- * denotes overtime.

== See also ==
- 1991 NAIA women's basketball tournament
- 1991 NCAA men's basketball tournaments (Division I, Division II, Division III)
- 1991 NCAA women's basketball tournaments (Division I, Division II, Division III)
- 1991 National Invitation Tournament
