= 1990–91 Michigan Wolverines men's basketball team =

American college basketball season

1990–91 Michigan Wolverines men's basketball

NIT, First Round
- Conference: Big Ten Conference
- Record: 14–15 (7–11 Big Ten)
- Head coach: Steve Fisher
- Assistant coaches: Brian Dutcher; Jay Smith; Edgar Burch (Volunteer)
- MVP: Demetrius Calip
- Captain: Demetrius Calip
- Home arena: Crisler Arena

1990–91 Big Ten Conference men's basketball standings
| | Conf. | | | | Overall |
| Team | W | | L | PCT | W | | L | PCT |
|---|---|---|---|---|---|---|---|---|
| No. 5 Ohio State | 15 | – | 3 | .833 | 27 | – | 4 | .871 |
| No. 3 Indiana | 15 | – | 3 | .833 | 29 | – | 5 | .853 |
| Illinois | 11 | – | 7 | .611 | 21 | – | 10 | .677 |
| Michigan State | 11 | – | 7 | .611 | 19 | – | 11 | .633 |
| Iowa | 9 | – | 9 | .500 | 21 | – | 11 | .656 |
| Purdue | 9 | – | 9 | .500 | 17 | – | 12 | .586 |
| Wisconsin | 8 | – | 10 | .444 | 15 | – | 15 | .500 |
| Michigan | 7 | – | 11 | .389 | 14 | – | 15 | .483 |
| Minnesota | 5 | – | 13 | .278 | 12 | – | 16 | .429 |
| Northwestern | 0 | – | 18 | .000 | 5 | – | 23 | .179 |
Rankings from AP Poll

The 1990–91 Michigan Wolverines men's basketball team represented the University of Michigan in intercollegiate college basketball during the 1990–91 season. The team played its home games in the Crisler Arena in Ann Arbor, Michigan, and was a member of the Big Ten Conference. Under the direction of head coach Steve Fisher, the team finished eighth in the Big Ten Conference. The team earned an invitation to the 1991 National Invitation Tournament (NIT) where it was eliminated in the first round. The team was unranked for the entire seventeen weeks of Associated Press Top Twenty-Five Poll, and it also ended the season unranked in the final UPI Coaches' Poll. The team had a 0–7 record against ranked opponents.

Demetrius Calip served as team captain and earned team MVP. The team's leading scorers were Calip (594 points), Michael Talley (318 points), and Kirk Taylor (301 points). The leading rebounders were Eric Riley (242), Kirk Taylor (119), and Calip (112). The leaders in assists were Calip (102), Talley (93) and Taylor (72).

Calip led the Big Ten Conference in three point shots made in conference games (48). The team led the conference in team three point shots made with 118 during their conference games.

In the 32-team National Invitation Tournament, Michigan was eliminated by Colorado 71–64 in the first round.

== Roster ==
1990–91 Michigan Wolverines men's basketball team
Players
Coaches

| Pos. | # | Name | Height | Weight | Year | Previous school | Hometown |
|---|---|---|---|---|---|---|---|
| G | 13 | Demetrius Calip | 6 ft 1 in (1.85 m) | 165 lb (75 kg) | Sr | Flint Northern | Flint, MI |
| G | 25 | Rob Pelinka | 6 ft 5 in (1.96 m) | 200 lb (91 kg) | RS So | Lake Forest | Lake Bluff, IL |
| C | 42 | Eric Riley | 7 ft 0 in (2.13 m) | 235 lb (107 kg) | Fr | St. Joseph | Cleveland, OH |

Head coach

- Steve Fisher

Assistant coach(es)

Legend

- (C) Team captain
- (S) Suspended
- (I) Ineligible
- (W) Walk-on
- Injured
- Current redshirt

== Schedule and results ==
| Date time, TV | Rank^{#} | Opponent^{#} | Result | Record | Site city, state |
Regular Season
| Nov 28, 1990* | | Central Michigan | W 72–63 | 1–0 | Crisler Arena; Ann Arbor, Michigan |
| Dec 1, 1990* | | Utah | W 81–65 | 2–0 | Crisler Arena; Ann Arbor, Michigan |
| Dec 4, 1990* | | Eastern Michigan | W 78–76 | 3–0 | Crisler Arena; Ann Arbor, Michigan |
| Dec 8, 1990* | | No. 5 Duke | L 68–75 | 3–1 | Cameron Indoor Stadium; Durham, North Carolina |
| Dec 10, 1990* | | Boston University | W 90–68 | 4–1 | Crisler Arena; Ann Arbor, Michigan |
| Dec 12, 1990* | | Chicago State | W 102–78 | 5–1 | Crisler Arena; Ann Arbor, Michigan |
| Dec 15, 1990* | | at Iowa State | L 72–81 | 5–2 | Hilton Coliseum; Ames, Iowa |
| Dec 22, 1990* | | Marquette | W 89–81 | 6–2 | Crisler Arena; Ann Arbor, Michigan |
| Dec 28, 1990* | | vs. Texas; Arizona State Cactus Classic | L 74–76 | 6–3 | Wells Fargo Arena; Tempe, Arizona |
| Dec 29, 1990* | | vs. Penn; Arizona State Cactus Classic | W 84–62 | 7–3 | Wells Fargo Arena; Tempe, Arizona |
| Jan 3, 1991 | | at No. 25 Michigan State | L 70–85 | 7–4 (0–1) | Breslin Center; East Lansing, Michigan |
| Jan 5, 1991 | | No. 6 Ohio State | L 57–67 | 7–5 (0–2) | Crisler Arena; Ann Arbor, Michigan |
| Jan 10, 1991 | | at No. 22 Iowa | L 78–79 | 7–6 (0–3) | Carver-Hawkeye Arena; Iowa City, Iowa |
| Jan 12, 1991 | | at Purdue | L 69–86 | 7–7 (0–4) | Mackey Arena; West Lafayette, Indiana |
| Jan 17, 1991 | | Northwestern | W 79–68 | 8–7 (1–4) | Crisler Arena; Ann Arbor, Michigan |
| Jan 19, 1991 | | at Wisconsin | W 69–68 ^{OT} | 9–7 (2–4) | Wisconsin Field House; Madison, Wisconsin |
| Jan 24, 1991 | | No. 3 Indiana | L 60–70 | 9–8 (2–5) | Crisler Arena; Ann Arbor, Michigan |
| Jan 26, 1991 | | Illinois | L 67–72 | 9–9 (2–6) | Crisler Arena; Ann Arbor, Michigan |
| Jan 31, 1991 | | at Minnesota | W 66–62 | 10–9 (3–6) | Williams Arena; Minneapolis, Minnesota |
| Feb 9, 1991 | | Iowa | W 84–70 | 11–9 (4–6) | Crisler Arena; Ann Arbor, Michigan |
| Feb 11, 1991 | | at No. 3 Ohio State | L 65–81 | 11–10 (4–7) | St. John Arena; Columbus, Ohio |
| Feb 16, 1991 | | at Northwestern | W 64–58 | 12–10 (5–7) | Welsh-Ryan Arena; Evanston, Illinois |
| Feb 18, 1991 | | Purdue | L 77–83 ^{2OT} | 12–11 (5–8) | Crisler Arena; Ann Arbor, Michigan |
| Feb 21, 1991 | | Wisconsin | W 65–62 | 13–11 (6–8) | Crisler Arena; Ann Arbor, Michigan |
| Feb 24, 1991 | | at No. 4 Indiana | L 70–112 | 13–12 (6–9) | Assembly Hall; Bloomington, Indiana |
| Feb 28, 1991 | | at Illinois | L 65–68 | 13–13 (6–10) | Assembly Hall; Champaign, Illinois |
| Mar 3, 1991 | | Minnesota | W 68–60 | 14–13 (7–10) | Crisler Arena; Ann Arbor, Michigan |
| Mar 9, 1991 | | Michigan State | L 59–66 | 14–14 (7–11) | Crisler Arena; Ann Arbor, Michigan |
NIT
| Mar 13, 1991 | | vs. Colorado; First Round | L 64–71 | 14–15 | Coors Center; Boulder, Colorado |
*Non-conference game. ^{#}Rankings from AP Poll. (#) Tournament seedings in parentheses.

== Team players drafted into the NBA ==
One player from this team was selected in the NBA draft.

| Year | Round | Pick | Overall | Player | NBA Club |
| 1993 | 2 | 6 | 33 | Eric Riley | Dallas Mavericks |
