= 1990–91 Ohio State Buckeyes men's basketball team =

American college basketball season

1990–91 Ohio State Buckeyes men's basketball

Big Ten regular season champions

NCAA men's Division I tournament, Sweet Sixteen
- Conference: Big Ten

Ranking
- Coaches: No. 5
- AP: No. 5
- Record: 27–4 (15–3 Big Ten)
- Head coach: Randy Ayers (2nd season)
- Home arena: St. John Arena

1990–91 Big Ten Conference men's basketball standings
	Conf.				Overall
Team	W		L	PCT	W		L	PCT
No. 5 Ohio State	15	–	3	.833	27	–	4	.871
No. 3 Indiana	15	–	3	.833	29	–	5	.853
Illinois	11	–	7	.611	21	–	10	.677
Michigan State	11	–	7	.611	19	–	11	.633
Iowa	9	–	9	.500	21	–	11	.656
Purdue	9	–	9	.500	17	–	12	.586
Wisconsin	8	–	10	.444	15	–	15	.500
Michigan	7	–	11	.389	14	–	15	.483
Minnesota	5	–	13	.278	12	–	16	.429
Northwestern	0	–	18	.000	5	–	23	.179
Rankings from AP Poll

The 1990–91 Ohio State Buckeyes men's basketball team represented Ohio State University as a member of the Big Ten Conference during the 1990–91 NCAA men's college basketball season. The team was led by second-year head coach Randy Ayers and played their home games at St. John Arena. After starting the season on a 17-game win streak and winning 25 of their first 26 games, the Buckeyes finished with an overall record of 27–4, and earned their first Big Ten championship in 20 years with a 15–3 conference record.

== Roster ==
1990–91 Ohio State Buckeyes men's basketball team
Players
Coaches

Pos.	#	Name	Height	Weight	Year	Hometown
G	3	Mark Baker	6 ft 1 in (1.85 m)	180 lb (82 kg)	So	Dayton, Ohio
G	15	Jamie Skelton	6 ft 2 in (1.88 m)	180 lb (82 kg)	Fr	Dayton, Ohio
G	20	Alex Davis	6 ft 1 in (1.85 m)	170 lb (77 kg)	So	Cincinnati, Ohio
SF	21	Chris Jent	6 ft 7 in (2.01 m)	215 lb (98 kg)	Jr	Sparta, New Jersey
SG	22	Jim Jackson	6 ft 6 in (1.98 m)	220 lb (100 kg)	So	Toledo, Ohio
C	23	Nick Hodak	6 ft 8 in (2.03 m)	185 lb (84 kg)		Toledo, Ohio
G	24	Scott Reeves	6 ft 0 in (1.83 m)	170 lb (77 kg)		Columbus, Ohio
G	30	Jamaal Brown	6 ft 4 in (1.93 m)	190 lb (86 kg)	Jr	Arlington, Texas
F	31	Tom Brandewie	6 ft 9 in (2.06 m)	220 lb (100 kg)	So	Fort Loramie, Ohio
C	32	Perry Carter	6 ft 8 in (2.03 m)	230 lb (104 kg)	Sr	Washington, D.C.
F	34	Treg Lee	6 ft 8 in (2.03 m)	220 lb (100 kg)	Sr	Cleveland, Ohio
C	42	Steve Hall	6 ft 8 in (2.03 m)	225 lb (102 kg)	Jr	Payne, Ohio
F	44	Jimmy Ratliff	6 ft 9 in (2.06 m)	211 lb (96 kg)	Fr	Middleton, Ohio
F	50	Joe Reid	6 ft 8 in (2.03 m)	215 lb (98 kg)	Fr	Pepper Pike, Ohio
C	54	Bill Robinson	7 ft 0 in (2.13 m)	245 lb (111 kg)	Jr	Canton, Ohio
PF	–	Lawrence Funderburke	6 ft 9 in (2.06 m)	225 lb (102 kg)	RS So	Columbus, Ohio

Head coach

- Randy Ayers (Miami (OH))

Assistant coach(es)

Legend

- (C) Team captain
- (S) Suspended
- (I) Ineligible
- (W) Walk-on
- Injured
- Current redshirt

== Schedule and results ==
Date time, TV	Rank^{#}	Opponent^{#}	Result	Record	Site city, state
Nov 25, 1990*	No. 10	Bethune-Cookman	W 111–72	1–0	St. John Arena; Columbus, OH
Nov 28, 1990*	No. 11	Delaware State	W 116–67	2–0	St. John Arena; Columbus, OH
Dec 1, 1990*	No. 11	Youngstown State	W 112–67	3–0	St. John Arena; Columbus, OH
Dec 8, 1990*	No. 9	Chicago State	W 112–54	4–0	St. John Arena; Columbus, OH
Dec 12, 1990*	No. 8	Wright State	W 90–60	5–0	St. John Arena; Columbus, OH
Dec 15, 1990*	No. 8	at American	W 109–73	6–0	Bender Arena; Washington, D.C.
Dec 17, 1990*	No. 7	Tennessee State	W 103–66	7–0	St. John Arena; Columbus, OH
Dec 22, 1990*	No. 7	vs. No. 12 Georgetown; Duel in the Desert	W 71–60	8–0	Thomas & Mack Center (18,500); Paradise, Nevada
Dec 27, 1990*	No. 6	vs. Mississippi State; Palm Beach Classic	W 82–80	9–0	West Palm Beach, Florida
Dec 28, 1990*	No. 6	vs. Miami (OH); Palm Beach Classic	W 85–67	10–0	West Palm Beach, Florida
Jan 3, 1991	No. 6	No. 22 Iowa	W 63–59	11–0 (1–0)	St. John Arena; Columbus, OH
Jan 5, 1991	No. 6	at Michigan	W 67–57	12–0 (2–0)	Crisler Arena; Ann Arbor, Michigan
Jan 10, 1991	No. 4	at Northwestern	W 102–62	13–0 (3–0)	Welsh-Ryan Arena; Evanston, Illinois
Jan 12, 1991	No. 4	Wisconsin	W 92–60	14–0 (4–0)	St. John Arena; Columbus, OH
Jan 19, 1991	No. 4	Illinois	W 89–55	15–0 (5–0)	St. John Arena; Columbus, OH
Jan 21, 1991	No. 4	at No. 3 Indiana	W 93–85	16–0 (6–0)	Assembly Hall; Bloomington, Indiana
Jan 24, 1991	No. 4	at Minnesota	W 80–70	17–0 (7–0)	Williams Arena; Minneapolis, Minnesota
Jan 31, 1991	No. 4	at Michigan State	L 61–75	17–1 (7–1)	Breslin Student Events Center; East Lansing, MI
Feb 3, 1991	No. 3	Purdue	W 66–59	18–1 (8–1)	St. John Arena; Columbus, OH
Feb 9, 1991	No. 3	Northwestern	W 96–64	19–1 (9–1)	St. John Arena; Columbus, OH
Feb 11, 1991	No. 2	Michigan	W 81–65	20–1 (10–1)	St. John Arena; Columbus, OH
Feb 14, 1991	No. 2	at Wisconsin	W 73–71	21–1 (11–1)	Wisconsin Field House; Madison, Wisconsin
Feb 17, 1991	No. 2	No. 4 Indiana	W 97–95	22–1 (12–1)	St. John Arena; Columbus, OH
Feb 20, 1991	No. 2	at Illinois	W 73–64	23–1 (13–1)	Assembly Hall; Champaign, Illinois
Feb 23, 1991	No. 2	Minnesota	W 63–62	24–1 (14–1)	St. John Arena; Columbus, Ohio
Mar 3, 1991	No. 2	Michigan State	W 65–64	25–1 (15–1)	St. John Arena; Columbus, Ohio
Mar 6, 1991	No. 2	at Purdue	L 67–72	25–2 (15–2)	Mackey Arena; West Lafayette, Indiana
Mar 10, 1991	No. 2	at Iowa	L 69–80	25–3 (15–3)	Carver-Hawkeye Arena; Iowa City, Iowa
NCAA tournament
Mar 15, 1991*	(1 MW) No. 5	vs. (16 MW) Towson State; First round	W 97–86	26–3	University of Dayton Arena; Dayton, Ohio
Mar 17, 1991*	(1 MW) No. 5	vs. (8 MW) Georgia Tech; Second round	W 65–61	27–3	University of Dayton Arena; Dayton, Ohio
Mar 22, 1991*	(1 MW) No. 5	vs. (4 MW) No. 20 St. John's; Midwest Regional semifinal	L 74–91	27–4	Pontiac Silverdome; Pontiac, Michigan
*Non-conference game. ^{#}Rankings from AP Poll. (#) Tournament seedings in parentheses. MW=Midwest.

== Rankings ==
Ranking movements Legend: ██ Increase in ranking ██ Decrease in ranking
	Week																
Poll	Pre	1	2	3	4	5	6	7	8	9	10	11	12	13	14	15	Final
AP	10	11	9	8	7	6	6	4	4	4	3	3	2	2	2	2	5
Coaches	11	12	9	7	7	6	6	4	3	4	3	3	2	2	2	2	5
