= Middleton, Ohio =

Middleton may refer to:

- Middleton, Columbiana County, Ohio
- Middleton Township, Wood County, Ohio

== See also ==
- Middleton Township, Ohio (disambiguation)
- Middletown, Ohio
