= 1990–91 Illinois Fighting Illini men's basketball team =

American college basketball season

1990–91 Illinois Fighting Illini men's basketball

Illini Classic, Champion

Banned from any postseason tournament
- Conference: Big Ten Conference
- Record: 21–10 (11–7 Big Ten)
- Head coach: Lou Henson (16th season)
- Assistant coaches: Dick Nagy (12th season); Jimmy Collins (8th season); Mark Coomes (6th season)
- MVPs: Andy Kpedi; Larry Smith
- Captains: Andy Kpedi; Larry Smith
- Home arena: Assembly Hall

1990–91 Big Ten Conference men's basketball standings
	Conf.				Overall
Team	W		L	PCT	W		L	PCT
No. 5 Ohio State	15	–	3	.833	27	–	4	.871
No. 3 Indiana	15	–	3	.833	29	–	5	.853
Illinois	11	–	7	.611	21	–	10	.677
Michigan State	11	–	7	.611	19	–	11	.633
Iowa	9	–	9	.500	21	–	11	.656
Purdue	9	–	9	.500	17	–	12	.586
Wisconsin	8	–	10	.444	15	–	15	.500
Michigan	7	–	11	.389	14	–	15	.483
Minnesota	5	–	13	.278	12	–	16	.429
Northwestern	0	–	18	.000	5	–	23	.179
Rankings from AP Poll

The 1990–91 Illinois Fighting Illini men's basketball team represented the University of Illinois.

== Regular season ==
Entering the 1990–91 season, Illinois, faced with the loss of Kendall Gill, Steve Bardo and Marcus Liberty, who declared himself eligible for the NBA draft after his junior season, was picked to finish as low as ninth in the Big Ten by some publications. But, junior forward Andy Kaufmann burst onto the scene scoring 660 points, the second largest single-season total in Illinois history. He and the Illini proved the preseason expectations wrong by going 21-10 and finishing third in the Big Ten.

=== Roster ===
1990–91 Illinois Fighting Illini men's basketball team
Players
Coaches

Pos.	#	Name	Height	Weight	Year	Previous school	Hometown
F	3	Tim Geers	6 ft 5 in (1.96 m)	195 lb (88 kg)	So	De La Salle High School	Chicago, Illinois
G	4	Brooks Taylor	6 ft 4 in (1.93 m)	170 lb (77 kg)	So	De La Salle High School	Chicago, Illinois
G	10	Rennie Clemons	6 ft 0 in (1.83 m)	175 lb (79 kg)	Fr	Calvary Academy	Springfield, Illinois
G	12	Pat Kennedy	—	—	Sr
G	23	Larry Smith (C)	6 ft 4 in (1.93 m)	190 lb (86 kg)	RS Sr	Alton High School	Alton, Illinois
F	24	Scott Pierce	6 ft 8 in (2.03 m)	195 lb (88 kg)	Fr	Trinity High School	Euless, Texas
F	25	Deon Thomas	6 ft 9 in (2.06 m)	200 lb (91 kg)	RS Fr	Simeon High School	Chicago, Illinois
F	32	Tom Michael	6 ft 8 in (2.03 m)	190 lb (86 kg)	RS Fr	Carlyle High School	Hoffman, Illinois
F	34	Andy Kaufmann	6 ft 6 in (1.98 m)	220 lb (100 kg)	Jr	Jacksonville High School	Jacksonville, Illinois
F	40	Matt Schnaderbeck	6 ft 5 in (1.96 m)	190 lb (86 kg)	Jr	Maine West High School	Des Plaines, Illinois
G	41	Scott Spitz	—	—	Sr
G	42	Gene Cross	6 ft 3 in (1.91 m)	185 lb (84 kg)	Fr	Rich Central High School	Olympia Fields, Illinois
G	44	T.J. Wheeler	6 ft 5 in (1.96 m)	195 lb (88 kg)	Fr	Christopher High School	Buckner, Illinois
C	50	Andy Kpedi (C)	6 ft 7 in (2.01 m)	215 lb (98 kg)	Sr	Kankakee Community College	Warri, Nigeria

Head coach

- Lou Henson (New Mexico State University) (16th year)

Assistant coach(es)

- Jimmy Collins (New Mexico State) (8th year)
- Dick Nagy (Hardin-Simmons University) (12th year)
- Mark Coomes (New Mexico State) (6th year)

Legend

- (C) Team captain
- (S) Suspended
- (I) Ineligible
- (W) Walk-on
- Injured
- Current redshirt

Roster

== Schedule ==
Date time, TV	Rank^{#}	Opponent^{#}	Result	Record	Site (attendance) city, state
Non-Conference regular season
11/23/1990*		at American-Puerto Rico; Puerto Rico Classic	W 103-84	1-0	Mario Morales Coliseum (400); Guaynabo, Puerto Rico
11/24/1990*		vs. Nebraska; Puerto Rico Classic	L 73-100	1-1	Mario Morales Coliseum (400); Guaynabo, Puerto Rico
11/25/1990*		vs. Old Dominion; Puerto Rico Classic	W 80-62	2-1	Mario Morales Coliseum (400); Guaynabo, Puerto Rico
11/29/1990*		Illinois-Chicago	L 60-71	2-2	Assembly Hall (11,117); Champaign, IL
12/1/1990*		Eastern Illinois	W 106-87	3-2	Assembly Hall (12,643); Champaign, IL
12/3/1990*		Wisconsin-Milwaukee	W 120-116 ^{2ot}	4-2	Assembly Hall (11,835); Champaign, IL
12/5/1990*		at Penn State	L 68-78	4-3	Rec Hall (7,347); University Park, PA
12/7/1990*		Oregon State; Illini Classic	W 112-78	5-3	Assembly Hall (12,631); Champaign, IL
12/8/1990*		Georgia Southern; Illini Classic	W 85-67	6-3	Assembly Hall (12,098); Champaign, IL
12/15/1990*		Arkansas-Little Rock; Illini Classic	W 83-72	7-3	Assembly Hall (12,213); Champaign, IL
12/19/1990*		vs. Missouri; Braggin' Rights	W 84-81	8-3	St. Louis Arena (17,253); St. Louis, MO
12/22/1990*		No. 10 Louisiana State	W 102-96	9-3	Assembly Hall (14,824); Champaign, IL
12/29/1990*		at Memphis State	W 84-75	10-3	Pyramid Arena (11,200); Memphis, TN
Big Ten regular season
1/2/1991		at No. 5 Indiana; Rivalry	L 74-109	10-4 (0-1)	Assembly Hall (17,283); Bloomington, IN
1/5/1991		Purdue	W 63-61	11-4 (1-1)	Assembly Hall (15,721); Champaign, IL
1/10/1991		Minnesota	W 67-66	12-4 (2-1)	Assembly Hall (12,435); Champaign, IL
1/17/1991		Michigan State	L 68-71	12-5 (2-2)	Assembly Hall (13,487); Champaign, IL
1/19/1991		at No. 4 Ohio State	L 55-89	12-6 (2-3)	St. John Arena (13,276); Columbus, OH
1/26/1991		at Michigan	W 72-67	13-6 (3-3)	Crisler Arena (11,707); Ann Arbor, MI
1/28/1991		Iowa; Rivalry	W 53-50	14-6 (4-3)	Assembly Hall (14,846); Champaign, IL
2/2/1991		Wisconsin	W 70-62	15-6 (5-3)	Assembly Hall (16,295); Champaign, IL
2/4/1991		Northwestern; Rivalry	W 73-59	16-6 (6-3)	Assembly Hall (12,068); Champaign, IL
2/6/1991		at Purdue	W 59-56	17-6 (7-3)	Mackey Arena (14,123); West Lafayette, IN
2/10/1991		at Minnesota	W 94-74	18-6 (8-3)	Williams Arena (16,305); Minneapolis, MN
2/16/1991		at Michigan State	L 58-62	18-7 (8-4)	Breslin Student Events Center (15,138); East Lansing, MI
2/20/1991		No. 2 Ohio State	L 64-73	18-8 (8-5)	Assembly Hall (13,885); Champaign, IL
2/23/1991		at Iowa; Rivalry	W 79-74	19-8 (9-5)	Carver–Hawkeye Arena (15,500); Iowa City, IA
2/28/1991		Michigan	W 68-65	20-8 (10-5)	Assembly Hall (14,584); Champaign, IL
3/2/1991		at Northwestern; Rivalry	W 91-81	21-8 (11-5)	Welsh-Ryan Arena (8,117); Evanston, IL
3/6/1991		at Wisconsin	L 77-85	21-9 (11-6)	Wisconsin Field House (11,189); Madison, WI
3/10/1991		No. 3 Indiana; Rivalry	L 58-70	21-10 (11-7)	Assembly Hall (16,321); Champaign, IL
*Non-conference game. ^{#}Rankings from AP Poll. (#) Tournament seedings in parentheses. All times are in Central Time.

== Player stats ==
Player	Games Played	Minutes Played	2 pt. Field Goals	3 pt. Field Goals	Free Throws	Rebounds	Assists	Blocks	Steals	Points
Andy Kaufmann	31	967	184	41	169	154	67	0	18	660
Deon Thomas	30	933	172	0	108	203	18	54	10	452
Larry Smith	29	989	116	24	90	168	144	8	42	394
Rennie Clemons	31	834	82	8	76	99	96	7	43	264
Andy Kpedi	31	766	83	0	35	197	15	27	13	201
Scott Pierce	31	512	50	0	25	96	18	7	11	135
Tom Michael	31	515	31	18	15	84	31	10	17	131
T.J. Wheeler	13	202	14	4	19	28	20	2	11	59
Brooks Taylor	27	362	21	1	13	54	28	4	27	58
Tim Geers	22	123	5	5	16	18	8	4	5	41
Matt Schnaderbeck	2	2	1	0	0	1	0	0	0	2
Pat Kennedy	11	17	0	0	1	2	1	0	0	1
Gene Cross	1	1	0	0	0	1	0	0	0	0
Scott Spitz	11	20	0	0	0	4	0	0	1	0

== Awards and honors ==
- Deon Thomas
  - Fighting Illini All-Century team (2005)
- Andy Kpedi
  - Team Most Valuable Player

== NCAA basketball tournament ==
- Postseason ban due to NCAA violations

== Team players drafted into the NBA ==
Player	NBA Club	Round	Pick
