= 1990–91 Indiana Hoosiers men's basketball team =

American college basketball season

1990–91 Indiana Hoosiers men's basketball

Big Ten Co-Champions

NCAA men's Division I tournament, Sweet Sixteen
- Conference: Big Ten Conference

Ranking
- Coaches: No. 3
- AP: No. 3
- Record: 29–5 (15–3 Big Ten)
- Head coach: Bobby Knight (20th season)
- Home arena: Assembly Hall

1990–91 Big Ten Conference men's basketball standings
	Conf.				Overall
Team	W		L	PCT	W		L	PCT
No. 5 Ohio State	15	–	3	.833	27	–	4	.871
No. 3 Indiana	15	–	3	.833	29	–	5	.853
Illinois	11	–	7	.611	21	–	10	.677
Michigan State	11	–	7	.611	19	–	11	.633
Iowa	9	–	9	.500	21	–	11	.656
Purdue	9	–	9	.500	17	–	12	.586
Wisconsin	8	–	10	.444	15	–	15	.500
Michigan	7	–	11	.389	14	–	15	.483
Minnesota	5	–	13	.278	12	–	16	.429
Northwestern	0	–	18	.000	5	–	23	.179
Rankings from AP Poll

The 1990–91 Indiana Hoosiers men's basketball team represented Indiana University. Their head coach was Bobby Knight, who was in his 20th year. The team played its home games in Assembly Hall in Bloomington, Indiana, and was a member of the Big Ten Conference.

The Hoosiers finished the regular season with an overall record of 29–5 and a conference record of 15–3, finishing 1st in the Big Ten Conference. As Big Ten Conference Champions, the Hoosiers were invited to participate in the 1991 NCAA tournament as a 2-seed, where IU advanced to the Sweet Sixteen.

== Roster ==
No.	Name	Position	Ht.	Year	Hometown
4	Lyndon Jones	G	6–2	Sr.	Marion, Indiana
20	Greg Graham	G	6–4	So.	Indianapolis, Indiana
21	Chris Reynolds	G	6–1	So.	Peoria, Illinois
22	Damon Bailey	G	6–3	Fr.	Bedford, Indiana
23	Jamal Meeks	G	6–1	Jr.	Freeport, Illinois
24	Matt Nover	F/C	6–8	So.	Chesterton, Indiana
25	Pat Knight	G	6–6	Fr.	Bloomington, Indiana
30	Todd Leary	G	6–3	RS So.	Indianapolis, Indiana
32	Eric Anderson	F/C	6–9	Jr.	Chicago, Illinois
33	Pat Graham	G	6–5	So.	Floyds Knobs, Indiana
40	Calbert Cheaney	G/F	6–7	So.	Evansville, Indiana
54	Chris Lawson	F/C	6–9	So.	Bloomington, Indiana

== Schedule/results ==
Date time, TV	Rank^{#}	Opponent^{#}	Result	Record	Site city, state
Regular season
11/20/1990*	No. 8	vs. Northeastern; Maui Invitational Tournament Quarterfinals	W 100–78	1–0	Lahaina Civic Center; Lahain, HI
11/24/1990*	No. 8	vs. Santa Clara; Maui Invitational Tournament Semifinals	W 73–69	2–0	Lahaina Civic Center; Lahaina, HI
11/25/1990*	No. 8	vs. No. 13 Syracuse; Maui Invitational Tournament Championship	L 74–77	2–1	Lahaina Civic Center; Lahaina, HI
11/28/1990*	No. 10	at Notre Dame	W 70–67	3–1	Joyce Center; Notre Dame, Indiana
12/1/1990*	No. 10	vs. No. 25 Louisville	W 72–52	4–1	Hoosier Dome; Indianapolis
12/4/1990*	No. 7	at Vanderbilt	W 84–73	5–1	Memorial Gymnasium; Nashville, Tennessee
12/7/1990*	No. 7	Niagara; Indiana Classic	W 101–64	6–1	Assembly Hall; Bloomington, Indiana
12/8/1990*	No. 7	San Diego; Indiana Classic	W 91–64	7–1	Assembly Hall; Bloomington, Indiana
12/15/1990*	No. 7	Western Michigan	W 97–68	8–1	Assembly Hall; Bloomington, Indiana
12/18/1990*	No. 6	No. 18 Kentucky; Indiana–Kentucky rivalry	W 87–84	9–1	Assembly Hall; Bloomington, Indiana
12/21/1990*	No. 6	at Iowa State	W 87–76	10–1	Hilton Coliseum; Ames, Iowa
12/27/1990*	No. 5	vs. Marshall; Hoosier Classic	W 91–67	11–1	Market Square Arena; Indianapolis
12/28/1990*	No. 5	vs. Ohio; Hoosier Classic	W 102–64	12–1	Market Square Arena; Indianapolis
1/2/1991	No. 5	Illinois; Rivalry	W 109–74	13–1 (1–0)	Assembly Hall; Bloomington, Indiana
1/5/1991	No. 5	Northwestern	W 99–58	14–1 (2–0)	Assembly Hall; Bloomington, Indiana
1/14/1991	No. 3	at Purdue; Rivalry	W 65–62	15–1 (3–0)	Mackey Arena; West Lafayette, Indiana
1/19/1991	No. 3	at No. 24 Iowa	W 99–79	16–1 (4–0)	Carver–Hawkeye Arena; Iowa City, Iowa
1/21/1991	No. 3	No. 4 Ohio State	L 85–93	16–2 (4–1)	Assembly Hall; Bloomington, Indiana
1/24/1991	No. 3	at Michigan	W 70–60	17–2 (5–1)	Crisler Arena; Ann Arbor, Michigan
1/26/1991	No. 3	No. 22 Michigan State	W 97–63	18–2 (6–1)	Assembly Hall; Bloomington, Indiana
1/30/1991	No. 4	Wisconsin	W 73–57	19–2 (7–1)	Assembly Hall; Bloomington, Indiana
2/3/1991	No. 4	at Minnesota	W 77–66	20–2 (8–1)	Williams Arena; Minneapolis
2/7/1991	No. 4	at Northwestern	W 105–74	21–2 (9–1)	Welsh-Ryan Arena; Evanston, Illinois
2/10/1991	No. 4	Purdue; Rivalry	W 81–63	22–2 (10–1)	Assembly Hall; Bloomington, Indiana
2/17/1991	No. 4	at No. 2 Ohio State	L 95–97	22–3 (10–2)	St. John Arena; Columbus, Ohio
2/21/1991	No. 4	Iowa	L 79–80	22–4 (10–3)	Assembly Hall; Bloomington, Indiana
2/24/1991	No. 4	Michigan	W 112–79	23–4 (11–3)	Assembly Hall; Bloomington, Indiana
2/28/1991	No. 5	at Michigan State	W 62–56	24–4 (12–3)	Breslin Center; East Lansing, Michigan
3/2/1991	No. 5	at Wisconsin	W 74–61	25–4 (13–3)	Wisconsin Field House; Madison, Wisconsin
3/7/1991	No. 3	Minnesota	W 75–59	26–4 (14–3)	Assembly Hall; Bloomington, Indiana
3/10/1991	No. 3	at Illinois; Rivalry	W 70–58	27–4 (15–3)	Assembly Hall; Champaign, Illinois
NCAA tournament
3/14/1991*	(2 SE) No. 3	vs. (15 SE) Coastal Carolina; First Round	W 79–69	28–4 (15–3)	Freedom Hall; Louisville, Kentucky
3/16/1991*	(2 SE) No. 3	vs. (7 SE) Florida State; Second Round	W 82–60	29–4 (15–3)	Freedom Hall; Louisville, Kentucky
3/21/1991*	(2 SE) No. 3	vs. (3 SE) No. 12 Kansas; Sweet Sixteen	L 65–83	29–5 (15–3)	Charlotte Coliseum; Charlotte, North Carolina
*Non-conference game. ^{#}Rankings from AP Poll. (#) Tournament seedings in parentheses.
