= 1990–91 Michigan State Spartans men's basketball team =

American college basketball season

1990–91 Michigan State Spartans men's basketball

Oldsmobile Spartan Classic champions

NCAA tournament, second round
- Conference: Big Ten Conference
- Record: 19–11 (11–7 Big Ten)
- Head coach: Jud Heathcote (15th season)
- Assistant coaches: Tom Izzo; Jim Boylen; Stan Joplin
- Captains: Steve Smith; Matt Steigenga
- Home arena: Breslin Center

1990–91 Big Ten Conference men's basketball standings
| | Conf. | | | | Overall |
| Team | W | | L | PCT | W | | L | PCT |
|---|---|---|---|---|---|---|---|---|
| No. 5 Ohio State | 15 | – | 3 | .833 | 27 | – | 4 | .871 |
| No. 3 Indiana | 15 | – | 3 | .833 | 29 | – | 5 | .853 |
| Illinois | 11 | – | 7 | .611 | 21 | – | 10 | .677 |
| Michigan State | 11 | – | 7 | .611 | 19 | – | 11 | .633 |
| Iowa | 9 | – | 9 | .500 | 21 | – | 11 | .656 |
| Purdue | 9 | – | 9 | .500 | 17 | – | 12 | .586 |
| Wisconsin | 8 | – | 10 | .444 | 15 | – | 15 | .500 |
| Michigan | 7 | – | 11 | .389 | 14 | – | 15 | .483 |
| Minnesota | 5 | – | 13 | .278 | 12 | – | 16 | .429 |
| Northwestern | 0 | – | 18 | .000 | 5 | – | 23 | .179 |
Rankings from AP Poll

The 1990–91 Michigan State Spartans men's basketball team represented Michigan State University in the 1990–91 NCAA Division I men's basketball season. The team played their home games at Breslin Center in East Lansing, Michigan and were members of the Big Ten Conference. They were coached by Jud Heathcote in his 15th year at Michigan State. The Spartans finished the season with a record of 19–11, 11–7 to finish in third place in Big Ten play. They received an at-large bid to the NCAA tournament as a No. 5 seed in the Midwest region where they beat Green Bay on a buzzer beater by Steve Smith. In the Second Round, they lost to No. 10 Utah in double overtime, 85–84.

The game marked the end of First Team All-American senior Steve Smith's career at Michigan State.

== Previous season ==
The Spartans finished the 1989–90 season with a record of 28–6, 15–3 to win the Big Ten Championship. Michigan State received the conference's automatic bid to the NCAA tournament as the No. 1 seed in the Southeast region. They beat Murray State and UC Santa Barbara to advance to the Sweet Sixteen. There they were upset by Georgia Tech in overtime.

== Roster ==
1990–91 Michigan State Spartans men's basketball team
| No | Name | Pos | Year | Height | Pts | Reb | Ast |
|---|---|---|---|---|---|---|---|
| 22 | Jeff Casler | G | SR | 6–0 | 0.4 | 0.4 | 0.2 |
| 45 | Ron Haley | F | SO | 6–6 | 0.4 | 0.0 | 0.2 |
| 44 | Matt Hofkamp | C | FR | 6–10 | 0.8 | 0.4 | 0.0 |
| 11 | Mark Montgomery | G | JR | 6–2 | 7.3 | 3.3 | 5.9 |
| 12 | Andy Penick | G | FR | 6–2 | 4.1 | 0.6 | 0.8 |
| 54 | Mike Peplowski | C | SO | 6–10 | 7.4 | 6.5 | 0.4 |
| 24 | Shawn Respert | G | FR | 6–3 | 0.0 | 0.0 | 0.0 |
| 21 | Steve Smith | G | SR | 6–7 | 25.2 | 6.0 | 3.7 |
| 35 | Matt Steigenga | F | JR | 6–7 | 12.8 | 4.9 | 2.2 |
| 31 | Dwayne Stephens | F | SO | 6–7 | 5.2 | 4.3 | 1.3 |
| 3 | Kris Weshinskey | G | FR | 6–3 | 2.8 | 1.1 | 0.7 |
| 25 | Jon Zulauf | F | SO | 6–6 | 1.3 | 1.7 | 0.1 |

== Schedule and results ==
| Date time, TV | Rank^{#} | Opponent^{#} | Result | Record | Site city, state |
Non-conference regular season
| Nov 23, 1990* | No. 4 | Furman | W 78–73 | 1–0 | Breslin Center; East Lansing, MI |
| Nov 28, 1990* | No. 5 | at Nebraska | L 69–71 | 1–1 | Bob Devaney Sports Center; Lincoln, NE |
| Dec 1, 1990* | No. 5 | at Bowling Green State | L 85–98 | 1–2 | Anderson Arena; Bowling Green, OH |
| Dec 8, 1990* | No. 19 | at Detroit | W 83–61 | 2–2 | Calihan Hall; Detroit, MI |
| Dec 13, 1990* | No. 21 | at Cincinnati | W 83–74 | 3–2 | Fifth Third Arena; Cincinnati, OH |
| Dec 15, 1990* | No. 21 | vs. No. 1 UNLV | L 75–95 | 3–3 | The Palace of Auburn Hills; Auburn Hills, MI |
| Dec 18, 1990* | No. 24 | Evansville | W 81–76 | 4–3 | Breslin Center; East Lansing, MI |
| Dec 20, 1990* | No. 24 | Central Michigan | W 74–61 | 5–3 | Breslin Center; East Lansing, MI |
| Dec 28, 1990* | No. 25 | George Mason; Oldsmobile Spartan Classic semifinals | W 97–72 | 6–3 | Breslin Center; East Lansing, MI |
| Dec 29, 1990* | No. 25 | Louisiana Tech; Oldsmobile Spartan Classic championship | W 77–62 | 7–3 | Breslin Center; East Lansing, MI |
Big Ten regular season
| Jan 3, 1991 | No. 25 | Michigan; Rivalry | W 85–70 | 8–3 (1–0) | Breslin Center; East Lansing, MI |
| Jan 5, 1991 | No. 25 | at No. 22 Iowa | L 66–79 | 8–4 (1–1) | Carver-Hawkeye Arena; Iowa City, IA |
| Jan 10, 1991 | | Wisconsin | W 65–50 | 9–4 (2–1) | Breslin Center; East Lansing, MI |
| Jan 12, 1991 | | Northwestern | W 66–59 | 10–4 (3–1) | Breslin Center; East Lansing, MI |
| Jan 17, 1991 | | at Illinois | W 71–68 | 11–4 (4–1) | Assembly Hall; Champaign, IL |
| Jan 19, 1991 | | Minnesota | W 73–64 | 12–4 (5–1) | Breslin Center; East Lansing, MI |
| Jan 23, 1991 | | at Purdue | L 51–62 | 12–5 (5–2) | Mackey Arena; West Lafayette, IN |
| Jan 26, 1991 | No. 22 | at No. 3 Indiana | L 63–97 | 12–6 (5–3) | Assembly Hall; Bloomington, IN |
| Jan 31, 1992 | | No. 3 Ohio State | W 75–61 | 13–6 (6–3) | Breslin Center; East Lansing, MI |
| Feb 7, 1991 | No. 25 | Iowa | L 67–71 | 13–7 (6–4) | Breslin Center; East Lansing, MI |
| Feb 9, 1991 | No. 25 | at Wisconsin | L 78–84 | 13–8 (6–5) | Wisconsin Field House; Madison, WI |
| Feb 14, 1991 | | at Northwestern | W 55–53 | 14–8 (7–5) | Welsh-Ryan Arena; Evanston, IL |
| Feb 16, 1991 | | Illinois | W 62–58 | 15–8 (8–5) | Breslin Center; East Lansing, MI |
| Feb 23, 1991 | | Purdue | W 75–58 | 16–8 (9–5) | Breslin Center; East Lansing, MI |
| Feb 25, 1991 | | at Minnesota | W 74–72 | 17–8 (10–5) | Williams Arena; Minneapolis, MN |
| Mar 3, 1991 | | No. 5 Indiana | L 56–62 | 17–9 (10–6) | Breslin Center; East Lansing, MI |
| Mar 3, 1991 | | at No. 2 Ohio State | L 64–65 | 17–10 (10–7) | St. John Arena; Columbus, OH |
| Mar 9, 1991 | | at Michigan; Rivalry | W 66–59 | 18–10 (11–7) | Crisler Arena; Ann Arbor, MI |
NCAA tournament
| Mar 15, 1991* | (5 W) | vs. (12 W) Green Bay; First Round | W 60–58 | 19–10 | McKale Center; Tucson, AZ |
| Mar 17, 1991* | (5 W) | vs. (4 W) No. 10 Utah; Second Round | L 84–85 ^{2OT} | 19–11 | McKale Center; Tucson, AZ |
*Non-conference game. ^{#}Rankings from AP Poll,. (#) Tournament seedings in parentheses. All times are in Central Time; Source.

== Rankings ==
Ranking movement Legend: ██ Increase in ranking. ██ Decrease in ranking. (RV) Received votes but unranked. (NR) Not ranked.
| Poll | Pre | Wk 2 | Wk 3 | Wk 4 | Wk 5 | Wk 6 | Wk 7 | Wk 8 | Wk 9 | Wk 10 | Wk 11 | Wk 12 | Wk 13 | Wk 14 | Wk 15 | Wk 16 | Wk 17 |
|---|---|---|---|---|---|---|---|---|---|---|---|---|---|---|---|---|---|
| AP | 4 | 5 | 19 | 21 | 24 | 25 | 25 | NR | NR | 22 | NR | 25 | NR | NR | NR | NR | NR |

Source.

== Awards and honors ==
- Steve Smith – All-Big Ten First Team
