= 1991 Big Eight Conference men's basketball tournament =

- Classification: Division I
- Season: 1990–91
- Teams: 8
- Finals site: Kemper Arena; Kansas City, MO
- Champions: Missouri (5th title)
- Winning coach: Norm Stewart (5th title)
- MVP: Doug Smith (Missouri)
- Television: Raycom Sports (Quarterfinals, Semi-Finals and Championship); ABC(Championship game)

1990–91 Big Eight Conference men's basketball standings
	Conf.				Overall
Team	W		L	PCT	W		L	PCT
No. 14 Oklahoma State	10	–	4	.714	24	–	8	.750
No. 12 Kansas	10	–	4	.714	27	–	8	.771
No. 11 Nebraska	9	–	5	.643	26	–	8	.765
Missouri †	8	–	6	.571	20	–	10	.667
Iowa State	6	–	8	.429	12	–	19	.387
Oklahoma	5	–	9	.357	20	–	15	.571
Colorado	5	–	9	.357	19	–	14	.576
Kansas State	3	–	11	.214	13	–	15	.464
† 1991 Big Eight tournament winner As of April 1, 1991; Rankings from AP poll

The 1991 Big Eight Conference men's basketball tournament was held March 8–10 at Kemper Arena in Kansas City, Missouri.

Fourth-seeded Missouri defeated #3 seed Nebraska in the championship game, 90–82. The Tigers were ineligible to play in the 1991 NCAA tournament. Kansas, Oklahoma State, and Nebraska received at-large bids.

== Bracket ==
Quarterfinals; Friday, March 8
1	#14 Oklahoma State	77
8	Kansas State	66
4	Missouri	97
5	Iowa State	81
3	#13 Nebraska	117
6	Oklahoma	113
7	Colorado	76
2	#12 Kansas	82

Semifinals; Saturday, March 9
1	#14 Oklahoma State	92
4	Missouri	94
3	#13 Nebraska	87
2	#12 Kansas	83

Championship; Sunday, March 10
4	Missouri	90
3	#13 Nebraska	82
