= 1990–91 Nebraska Cornhuskers men's basketball team =

American college basketball season

1990–91 Nebraska Cornhuskers men's basketball

NCAA tournament
- Conference: Big Eight Conference

Ranking
- Coaches: No. 9
- AP: No. 11
- Record: 26–8 (9–5 Big Eight)
- Head coach: Danny Nee (5th season)
- Assistant coaches: Gary Bargen; Lynn Mitchem; Jeff Smith
- Home arena: Bob Devaney Sports Center

1990–91 Big Eight Conference men's basketball standings
	Conf.				Overall
Team	W		L	PCT	W		L	PCT
No. 14 Oklahoma State	10	–	4	.714	24	–	8	.750
No. 12 Kansas	10	–	4	.714	27	–	8	.771
No. 11 Nebraska	9	–	5	.643	26	–	8	.765
Missouri †	8	–	6	.571	20	–	10	.667
Iowa State	6	–	8	.429	12	–	19	.387
Oklahoma	5	–	9	.357	20	–	15	.571
Colorado	5	–	9	.357	19	–	14	.576
Kansas State	3	–	11	.214	13	–	15	.464
† 1991 Big Eight tournament winner As of April 1, 1991; Rankings from AP poll

The 1990–91 Nebraska Cornhuskers men's basketball team represented the University of Nebraska–Lincoln during the 1990–91 college basketball season. Led by head coach Danny Nee (5th season), the Cornhuskers competed in the Big Eight Conference and played their home games at the Bob Devaney Sports Center. They finished with a record of 26–8 overall and 9–5 in Big Eight Conference play, establishing the single-season school record for wins. Nebraska fell to Missouri, 90–82, in the championship game of the Big Eight tournament, but earned an at-large bid to the 1991 NCAA tournament as the #3 seed in the Midwest region. It would be the first of four consecutive trips to the NCAA Tournament for the Nebraska men's basketball program.

== Roster ==
1990–91 Nebraska Cornhuskers men's basketball team
Players
Coaches

Pos.	#	Name	Height	Weight	Year	Previous school	Hometown
F	00	Dapreis Owens	6 ft 8 in (2.03 m)	230 lb (104 kg)	Jr	Mansfield	Mansfield, OH
F	4	Tony Farmer	6 ft 9 in (2.06 m)	225 lb (102 kg)	Jr	San Jose State	Los Angeles, CA
G	10	Jose Ramos	6 ft 2 in (1.88 m)	190 lb (86 kg)	Jr	Miami	Miami, FL
G	11	Keith Moody	5 ft 11 in (1.8 m)	190 lb (86 kg)	Sr	Herndon	Herndon, VA
G	14	J.F. Hoffman	6 ft 1 in (1.85 m)	190 lb (86 kg)	Jr	Cambridge	Holbrook, NE
G	20	Mario McIntosh	6 ft 0 in (1.83 m)	160 lb (73 kg)	Fr	Benet Academy	Woodridge, IL
F	21	Carl Hayes	6 ft 8 in (2.03 m)	195 lb (88 kg)	Jr	St. Joseph	Chicago, IL
G	23	Clifford Scales	6 ft 2 in (1.88 m)	170 lb (77 kg)	Sr	St. Joseph	Maywood, IL
G	24	Chris Cresswell	6 ft 4 in (1.93 m)	195 lb (88 kg)	Jr	Merced	Merced, CA
C	25	Rich King	7 ft 2 in (2.18 m)	260 lb (118 kg)	Sr	Burke	Omaha, NE
G	33	Jamie Cole	6 ft 3 in (1.91 m)	180 lb (82 kg)	So	Creston	Grand Rapids, MI
C	34	Kelly Lively	7 ft 0 in (2.13 m)	215 lb (98 kg)	Sr	Torrington	Torrington, WY
F	40	Beau Reid	6 ft 8 in (2.03 m)	220 lb (100 kg)	RS Sr	Lancaster	Lancaster, OH
F	41	Bruce Chubick	6 ft 7 in (2.01 m)	215 lb (98 kg)	RS Fr	West Holt	Atkinson, NE
G	52	Eric Piatkowski	6 ft 6 in (1.98 m)	200 lb (91 kg)	RS Fr	Stevens	Rapid City, SD

Head coach

Danny Nee

Assistant coach(es)

- Gary Bargen
- Lynn Mitchem
- Jeff Smith

Legend

- (C) Team captain
- (S) Suspended
- (I) Ineligible
- (W) Walk-on
- Injured
- Current redshirt

Roster
Last update: March 28, 2020

== Schedule and results ==
Date time, TV	Rank^{#}	Opponent^{#}	Result	Record	Site city, state
Regular season
Nov 23, 1990*		vs. Saint Louis; Puerto Rico Classic	W 107–79	1–0	Mario Morales Coliseum; Guaynabo, Puerto Rico
Nov 24, 1990*		vs. Illinois; Puerto Rico Classic	W 100–73	2–0	Mario Morales Coliseum; Guaynabo, Puerto Rico
Nov 25, 1990*		vs. Murray State; Puerto Rico Classic	L 79–81	2–1	Mario Morales Coliseum; Guaynabo, Puerto Rico
Nov 28, 1990*		No. 5 Michigan State	W 71–69	3–1	Bob Devaney Sports Center; Lincoln, Nebraska
Dec 3, 1990*		at Eastern Illinois	W 94–64	4–1	Lantz Arena; Charleston, Illinois
Dec 6, 1990*		Creighton; Rivalry	W 97–63	5–1	Bob Devaney Sports Center; Lincoln, Nebraska
Dec 8, 1990*		Toledo	W 105–68	6–1	Bob Devaney Sports Center; Lincoln, Nebraska
Dec 11, 1990*		at Wisconsin	W 75–63	7–1	Wisconsin Field House; Madison, Wisconsin
Dec 14, 1990*		Tennessee Tech; Ameritas Classic	W 113–92	8–1	Bob Devaney Sports Center; Lincoln, Nebraska
Dec 15, 1990*		Bowling Green; Ameritas Classic	W 99–85	9–1	Bob Devaney Sports Center; Lincoln, Nebraska
Dec 22, 1990*	No. 22	Miami (OH)	W 88–73	10–1	Bob Devaney Sports Center; Lincoln, Nebraska
Dec 28, 1990*	No. 22	Idaho	W 85–65	11–1	Bob Devaney Sports Center; Lincoln, Nebraska
Dec 30, 1990*	No. 22	at The Citadel	W 94–80	12–1	McAlister Field House; Charleston, South Carolina
Jan 2, 1991*	No. 19	at Wisconsin-Green Bay	W 70–63	13–1	Brown County Arena; Ashwaubenon, Wisconsin
Jan 5, 1991	No. 19	at Kansas State	W 74–69	14–1 (1–0)	Bramlage Coliseum; Manhattan, Kansas
Jan 9, 1991*	No. 18	at Missouri-Kansas City	W 97–78	15–1	Municipal Auditorium; Kansas City, Missouri
Jan 12, 1991	No. 18	Iowa State	W 97–87	16–1 (2–0)	Bob Devaney Sports Center; Lincoln, Nebraska
Jan 22, 1991	No. 14	at Colorado	L 69–86	16–2 (2–1)	CU Events/Conference Center; Boulder, Colorado
Jan 26, 1991	No. 14	at No. 13 Oklahoma	W 111–99	17–2 (3–1)	Lloyd Noble Center; Norman, Oklahoma
Jan 30, 1991	No. 11	Missouri	W 89–75	18–2 (4–1)	Bob Devaney Sports Center; Lincoln, Nebraska
Feb 2, 1991	No. 11	Oklahoma State	L 68–81	18–3 (4–2)	Bob Devaney Sports Center; Lincoln, Nebraska
Feb 6, 1991	No. 15	at No. 18 Kansas	L 77–85	18–4 (4–3)	Allen Fieldhouse; Lawrence, Kansas
Feb 9, 1991*	No. 15	Colorado	W 86–72	19–4 (5–3)	Bob Devaney Sports Center; Lincoln, Nebraska
Feb 13, 1991	No. 17	at Iowa State	W 65–57	20–4 (6–3)	Hilton Coliseum; Ames, Iowa
Feb 16, 1991	No. 17	Oklahoma	W 105–93	21–4 (7–3)	Bob Devaney Sports Center; Lincoln, Nebraska
Feb 18, 1991*	No. 17	Northern Illinois	W 82–73	22–4	Bob Devaney Sports Center; Lincoln, Nebraska
Feb 20, 1991	No. 14	at Missouri	L 71–91	22–5 (7–4)	Hearnes Center; Columbia, Missouri
Feb 23, 1991	No. 14	Kansas State	W 85–78	23–5 (8–4)	Bob Devaney Sports Center; Lincoln, Nebraska
Feb 27, 1991	No. 15	at No. 12 Oklahoma State	L 69–80	23–6 (8–5)	Gallagher-Iba Arena; Stillwater, Oklahoma
Mar 3, 1991	No. 15	No. 10 Kansas	W 85–75	24–6 (9–5)	Bob Devaney Sports Center; Lincoln, Nebraska
Big Eight tournament
Mar 8, 1991*	(3) No. 13	vs. (6) Oklahoma; Quarterfinals	W 117–113 ^{OT}	25–6	Kemper Arena; Kansas City, Missouri
Mar 9, 1991*	(3) No. 13	vs. (2) No. 12 Kansas; Semifinals	W 87–83	26–6	Kemper Arena; Kansas City, Missouri
Mar 10, 1991*	(3) No. 13	vs. (4) Missouri; Championship	L 82–90	26–7	Kemper Arena; Kansas City, Missouri
NCAA Tournament
Mar 14, 1991*	(3 MW) No. 11	vs. (14 MW) Xavier; First Round	L 84–89	26–8	Hubert H. Humphrey Metrodome; Minneapolis, Minnesota
*Non-conference game. ^{#}Rankings from AP poll. (#) Tournament seedings in parentheses. MW=Midwest. All times are in Central Time.

== Rankings ==
Ranking movements Legend: ██ Increase in ranking ██ Decrease in ranking — = Not ranked
	Week																
Poll	Pre	1	2	3	4	5	6	7	8	9	10	11	12	13	14	15	Final
AP	—	—	—	—	22	22	19	18	17	14	11	15	17	14	15	13	11
Coaches	—	—	—	—	21	19	15	14	13	12	11	14	16	13	13	13	9

== Team players drafted into the NBA ==
Round	Pick	Player	NBA club
1	14	Rich King	Seattle SuperSonics
