= 1990–91 Kansas Jayhawks men's basketball team =

American college basketball season

1990–91 Kansas Jayhawks men's basketball

NCAA tournament, Runner-up Big Eight Regular Season Co-Champions

National Championship Game, L 65-72 vs. Duke
- Conference: Big Eight Conference

Ranking
- Coaches: No. 12
- AP: No. 12
- Record: 27–8 (10–4 Big Eight)
- Head coach: Roy Williams (3rd season)
- Assistant coaches: Jerry Green (3rd season); Steve Robinson (3rd season); Kevin Stallings (3rd season); Mark Turgeon (4th season)
- Captains: Terry Brown; Mike Maddox; Mark Randall; Kirk Wagner
- Home arena: Allen Fieldhouse

1990–91 Big Eight Conference men's basketball standings
	Conf.				Overall
Team	W		L	PCT	W		L	PCT
No. 14 Oklahoma State	10	–	4	.714	24	–	8	.750
No. 12 Kansas	10	–	4	.714	27	–	8	.771
No. 11 Nebraska	9	–	5	.643	26	–	8	.765
Missouri †	8	–	6	.571	20	–	10	.667
Iowa State	6	–	8	.429	12	–	19	.387
Oklahoma	5	–	9	.357	20	–	15	.571
Colorado	5	–	9	.357	19	–	14	.576
Kansas State	3	–	11	.214	13	–	15	.464
† 1991 Big Eight tournament winner As of April 1, 1991; Rankings from AP poll

The 1990–91 Kansas Jayhawks men's basketball team represented the University of Kansas in the 1990–91 NCAA Division I men's basketball season, which was the Jayhawks' 93rd basketball season. The head coach was Roy Williams, who served his 3rd year at KU. The team played its home games in Allen Fieldhouse in Lawrence, Kansas.

== Roster ==
Name	#	Position	Height	Weight	Year	Home Town
Terry Brown	3	Guard	6–2	190	Senior	Clyde, New York
Doug Elstun	21	Guard	6–3	185	Junior	Shawnee, Kansas
Alonzo Jamison	24	Forward	6-6	225	Junior	Santa Ana, California
David Johanning	54	Center	6–10	220	Junior	Wichita, Kansas
Adonis Jordan	30	Guard	5–11	170	Sophomore	Reseda, California
Mike Maddox	32	Forward	6–7	200	Senior	Reseda, California
Macolm Nash	43	Forward	6–7	210	Junior	St. Louis, Missouri
Mark Randall	42	Forward	6–9	235	Senior	Englewood, Colorado
Patrick Richey	12	Forward/Guard	6–8	190	Freshman	Lee's Summit, Missouri
Richard Scott	34	Forward	6–7	215	Freshman	Little Rock, Arkansas
Sean Tunstall	22	Guard	6–2	185	Junior	St. Louis, Missouri
Kirk Wagner	31	Forward	6–7	215	Senior	Pasadena, California
Steve Woodberry	20	Guard	6–4	180	Freshman	Wichita, Kansas

== Big Eight Conference standings ==
#	Team	Conference	Pct.	Overall	Pct.
1	Oklahoma State	10-4	.714	24-8	.750
2	Kansas	10-4	.714	27-8	.771
3	Nebraska	9-5	.643	26-8	.765
4	Missouri	8-6	.571	20-10	.667
5	Iowa State	6-8	.429	12-19	.387
6	Oklahoma	5-9	.357	20-15	.571
7	Colorado	5-9	.357	19-14	.576
8	Kansas State	3-11	.214	13-15	.464

== Schedule ==
Date time, TV	Rank^{#}	Opponent^{#}	Result	Record	Site city, state
11/23/1990*		at Arizona State	L 68–70	0–1	ASU Activity Center; Tempe, AZ
11/24/1990*		at Northern Arizona	W 84-57	1-1	Walkup Skydome; Flagstaff, AZ
12/1/1990*		Marquette	W 108-71	2-1	Allen Fieldhouse; Lawrence, KS
12/4/1990*		SMU	W 80-60	3-1	Allen Fieldhouse; Lawrence, KS
12/8/1990*		at No. 25 Kentucky	L 71-88	3-2	Rupp Arena; Lexington, KY
12/15/1990*		Rider	W 103-51	4-2	Allen Fieldhouse; Lawrence, KS
12/22/1990*		UTSA	W 101-69	5-2	Allen Fieldhouse; Lawrence, KS
12/28/1990*		at Hawaii Loa	W 111-58	6-2	Oahu, HI
1/2/1991*		at Pepperdine	W 88-62	7-2	Firestone Fieldhouse; Malibu, CA
1/5/1991*		NC State	W 105-94	8-2	Allen Fieldhouse; Lawrence, KS
1/8/1991		at No. 12 Oklahoma	L 82-88	8-3	Lloyd Noble Center; Norman, OK
1/10/1991*		UMBC	W 97-46	9-3	Allen Fieldhouse; Lawrence, KS
1/12/1991		at Oklahoma State	L 73-78 ^{OT}	9-4	Gallagher-Iba Arena; Stillwater, OK
1/16/1991*		Miami	W 73-60	10-4	Allen Fieldhouse; Lawrence, KS
1/19/1991		Missouri; Border War	W 91-64	11-4	Allen Fieldhouse; Lawrence, KS
1/23/1991*		Wichita State	W 84-50	12-4	Allen Fieldhouse; Lawrence, KS
1/26/1991		Colorado	W 95-62	13-4	Allen Fieldhouse; Lawrence, KS
1/29/1991	No. 24	at Kansas State; Sunflower Showdown	W 78-69	14-4	Bramlage Coliseum; Manhattan, KS
2/2/1991	No. 24	at Iowa State	W 85-78	15-4	Hilton Coliseum; Ames, IA
2/6/1991	No. 18	No. 15 Nebraska	W 85-77	16-4	Allen Fieldhouse; Lawrence, KS
2/9/1991	No. 18	No. 22 Oklahoma State	W 79-69	17-4	Allen Fieldhouse; Lawrence, KS
2/12/1991	No. 11	at Missouri; Border War	W 74-70	18-4	Hearnes Center; Columbia, MO
2/16/1991	No. 11	Kansas State; Sunflower Showdown	W 69-67	19-4	Allen Fieldhouse; Lawrence, KS
2/20/1991	No. 8	at Colorado	L 71-79	19-5	Coors Events Center; Boulder, CO
2/23/1991	No. 8	No. 12 Oklahoma	W 109-87	20-5	Allen Fieldhouse; Lawrence, KS
2/26/1991	No. 10	Iowa State	W 88-57	21-5	Allen Fieldhouse; Lawrence, KS
3/3/1991	No. 10	at No. 15 Nebraska	L 75-85	21-6	Bob Devaney Sports Center; Lincoln, NE
Big Eight Tournament
3/8/1991	(2) No. 12	vs. (7) Colorado; First round	W 82-76	22-6	Kemper Arena; Kansas City, MO
3/9/1991	(2) No. 12	vs. (3) No. 13 Nebraska; Semifinals	L 83-87	22-7	Kemper Arena; Kansas City, MO
NCAA tournament
3/14/1991*	(3 SE) No. 12	vs. (14 SE) New Orleans; First round	W 55-49	23-7	Freedom Hall; Louisville, KY
3/16/1991*	(3 SE) No. 12	vs. (6 SE) Pittsburgh; Second Round	W 77-66	24-7	Freedom Hall; Louisville, KY
3/21/1991*	(3 SE) No. 12	vs. (2 SE) No. 3 Indiana; Regional semifinals	W 83-65	25-7	Charlotte Coliseum; Charlotte, NC
3/23/1991*	(3 SE) No. 12	vs. (1 SE) No. 2 Arkansas; Regional Finals	W 93-81	26-7	Charlotte Coliseum; Charlotte, NC
3/30/1991*	(3 SE) No. 12	vs. (1 E) No. 4 North Carolina; National semifinals	W 79-73	27-7	Hoosier Dome; Indianapolis, IN
4/1/1991*; CBS	(3 SE) No. 12	vs. (2 MW) No. 6 Duke; National Championship game	L 65-72	27-8	Hoosier Dome; Indianapolis, IN
*Non-conference game. ^{#}Rankings from AP Poll, NCAA tournament seeds shown in parentheses. (#) Tournament seedings in parentheses. All times are in Central Standard Time.

== Rankings ==
Poll	Pre	Wk 1	Wk 2	Wk 3	Wk 4	Wk 5	Wk 6	Wk 7	Wk 8	Wk 9	Wk 10	Wk 11	Wk 12	Wk 13	Wk 14	Wk 15	Wk 16
AP											24	18	11	8	10	12	12
Coaches																	

*There was no coaches poll in week 1.
