= 1990–91 Iowa Hawkeyes men's basketball team =

American college basketball season

1990–91 Iowa Hawkeyes men's basketball

Amana-Hawkeye Classic champion Big Island Invitational champion

NCAA men's Division I tournament, Round of 32
- Conference: Big Ten Conference
- Record: 21–11 (9–9 Big Ten)
- Head coach: Tom Davis (5th season)
- Assistant coaches: Bruce Pearl; Gary Close
- MVPs: Acie Earl; James Moses
- Home arena: Carver-Hawkeye Arena

1990–91 Big Ten Conference men's basketball standings
	Conf.				Overall
Team	W		L	PCT	W		L	PCT
No. 5 Ohio State	15	–	3	.833	27	–	4	.871
No. 3 Indiana	15	–	3	.833	29	–	5	.853
Illinois	11	–	7	.611	21	–	10	.677
Michigan State	11	–	7	.611	19	–	11	.633
Iowa	9	–	9	.500	21	–	11	.656
Purdue	9	–	9	.500	17	–	12	.586
Wisconsin	8	–	10	.444	15	–	15	.500
Michigan	7	–	11	.389	14	–	15	.483
Minnesota	5	–	13	.278	12	–	16	.429
Northwestern	0	–	18	.000	5	–	23	.179
Rankings from AP Poll

The 1990–91 Iowa Hawkeyes men's basketball team represented the University of Iowa as members of the Big Ten Conference. The team was led by fifth-year head coach Tom Davis and played their home games at Carver-Hawkeye Arena. They finished the season 21–11 overall and 9–9 in Big Ten play to finish tied for fifth place. The Hawkeyes received an at-large bid to the NCAA tournament as #7 seed in the Midwest Region. After defeating East Tennessee State 76–73 in the first round, the Hawkeyes lost to #2 seed, and eventual National Champion, Duke 85–70 in the Round of 32.

== Roster ==
1990–91 Iowa Hawkeyes men's basketball team
Players
Coaches

Pos.	#	Name	Height	Weight	Year	Hometown
G	10	Kevin Smith	5 ft 11 in (1.8 m)	—	Fr	Fort Worth, Texas
G	11	Troy Skinner	6 ft 0 in (1.83 m)	—	Jr	Palmer, Iowa
G	13	Paul Lusk (injured)	—	—	Fr	New Baden, Illinois
G/F	15	Rodell Davis	6 ft 3 in (1.91 m)	—	Jr	Chicago, Illinois
G	20	Val Barnes	6 ft 2 in (1.88 m)	—	So	Wichita, Kansas
F	23	James Winters	6 ft 5 in (1.96 m)	—	Fr	Joliet, Illinois
F	24	James Moses	6 ft 4 in (1.93 m)	—	Jr	Carson, California
F	32	Jim Bartels	6 ft 6 in (1.98 m)	—	Fr	Freedom, Wisconsin
F	34	Wade Lookingbill	6 ft 5 in (1.96 m)	—	So	Fort Dodge, Iowa
F	40	Chris Street	6 ft 8 in (2.03 m)	210 lb (95 kg)	Fr	Indianola, Iowa
F	42	Jay Webb	6 ft 8 in (2.03 m)	—	So	San Jose, California
F	43	Brig Tubbs	6 ft 9 in (2.06 m)	—	Jr	DeWitt, Iowa
F/C	55	Acie Earl	6 ft 10 in (2.08 m)	225 lb (102 kg)	So	Moline, Illinois

Head coach

- Tom Davis (UW–Platteville)

Assistant coach(es)

- Bruce Pearl
- Gary Close

Legend

- (C) Team captain
- (S) Suspended
- (I) Ineligible
- (W) Walk-on
- Injured
- Current redshirt

== Schedule/results ==
Date time, TV	Rank^{#}	Opponent^{#}	Result	Record	Site city, state
Non-conference regular season
11/15/1990*		No. 19 Temple; Preseason NIT	W 73–71	1–0	Carver-Hawkeye Arena; Iowa City, IA
11/17/1990*		at Notre Dame; Preseason NIT	L 68–77	1–1	Joyce Center; South Bend, IN
11/27/1990*		Drake; Iowa Big Four	W 80–61	2–1	Carver-Hawkeye Arena (10,248); Iowa City, IA
11/30/1990*		Colgate; Amana-Hawkeye Classic	W 80–59	3–1	Carver-Hawkeye Arena; Iowa City, IA
12/1/1990*		Creighton; Amana-Hawkeye Classic	W 83–77	4–1	Carver-Hawkeye Arena (15,500); Iowa City, IA
12/4/1990*		Northern Iowa; Iowa Big Four	W 72–68	5–1	Carver-Hawkeye Arena (15,500); Iowa City, IA
12/8/1990*		Iowa State; Rivalry	W 75–73	6–1	Carver-Hawkeye Arena (15,500); Iowa City, IA
12/15/1990*		UMBC	W 98–81	7–1	Carver-Hawkeye Arena; Iowa City, IA
12/18/1990*		Chicago State	W 93–70	8–1	Carver-Hawkeye Arena; Iowa City, IA
12/22/1990*		No. 5 UCLA	W 88–71	9–1	Carver-Hawkeye Arena (15,500); Iowa City, IA
12/28/1990*	No. 23	vs. Hawaii-Hilo; Big Island Invitational	W 78–65	10–1	Hilo Civic Auditorium; Hilo, HI
12/30/1990*	No. 23	vs. Chaminade; Big Island Invitational	W 104–64	11–1	Hilo Civic Auditorium; Hilo, HI
Big Ten Regular Season
1/3/1991	No. 22	at No. 6 Ohio State	L 59–63	11–2 (0–1)	St. John Arena; Columbus, OH
1/5/1991	No. 22	No. 25 Michigan State	W 79–66	12–2 (1–1)	Carver-Hawkeye Arena; Iowa City, IA
1/10/1991	No. 22	Michigan	W 79–78	13–2 (2–1)	Carver-Hawkeye Arena; Iowa City, IA
1/12/1991	No. 22	at Minnesota	L 77–79	13–3 (2–2)	Williams Arena (16,555); Minneapolis, MN
1/17/1991	No. 24	at Wisconsin	L 79–91	13–4 (2–3)	Wisconsin Field House; Madison, WI
1/19/1991	No. 24	No. 3 Indiana	L 79–99	13–5 (2–4)	Carver-Hawkeye Arena (15,500); Iowa City, IA
1/28/1991		at Illinois	L 50–53	13–6 (2–5)	Assembly Hall (14,486); Champaign, IL
1/31/1991		at Purdue	W 78–69	14–6 (3–5)	Mackey Arena (14,123); West Lafayette, IN
2/2/1991		Northwestern	W 82–66	15–6 (4–5)	Carver-Hawkeye Arena (15,500); Iowa City, IA
2/7/1991		at No. 25 Michigan State	W 71–67	16–6 (5–5)	Breslin Center (15,138); East Lansing, MI
2/9/1991		at Michigan	L 70–84	16–7 (5–6)	Crisler Arena (12,644); Ann Arbor, MI
2/14/1991		Minnesota	W 82–69	17–7 (6–6)	Carver-Hawkeye Arena (15,500); Iowa City, IA
2/16/1991		Wisconsin	L 55–56	17–8 (6–7)	Carver-Hawkeye Arena (15,500); Iowa City, IA
2/21/1991		at No. 4 Indiana	W 80–79 ^{OT}	18–8 (7–7)	Assembly Hall (16,895); Bloomington, IN
2/23/1991		Illinois	L 74–79	18–9 (7–8)	Carver-Hawkeye Arena (15,500); Iowa City, IA
3/2/1991		Purdue	L 65–70	18–10 (7–9)	Carver-Hawkeye Arena; Iowa City, IA
3/7/1991		at Northwestern	W 79–76	19–10 (8–9)	Welsh-Ryan Arena (7,112); Evanston, IL
3/9/1991		No. 2 Ohio State	W 80–69	20–10 (9–9)	Carver-Hawkeye Arena (15,500); Iowa City, IA
NCAA tournament
3/14/1991*	(7 MW)	vs. (10 MW) No. 17 East Tennessee State; First Round	W 76–73	21–10	Hubert H. Humphrey Metrodome; Minneapolis, MN
3/16/1991*; CBS	(7 MW)	vs. (2 MW) No. 6 Duke; Second Round	L 70–85	21–11	Hubert H. Humphrey Metrodome; Minneapolis, MN
*Non-conference game. ^{#}Rankings from AP Poll. (#) Tournament seedings in parentheses. MW=Midwest.
