= 1991 Midwestern Collegiate Conference men's basketball tournament =

- Classification: Division I
- Season: 1990–91
- Teams: 8
- Site: UD Arena; Dayton, Ohio
- Champions: Xavier (6th title)
- Winning coach: Pete Gillen (5th title)
- MVP: Jamie Gladden (Xavier)

1990–91 Midwestern Collegiate Conference men's basketball standings
	Conf.				Overall
Team	W		L	PCT	W		L	PCT
Xavier †	11	–	3	.786	22	–	10	.688
Butler	10	–	4	.714	18	–	11	.621
Saint Louis	8	–	6	.571	19	–	14	.576
Dayton	8	–	6	.571	14	–	15	.483
Evansville	7	–	7	.500	14	–	14	.500
Marquette	7	–	7	.500	11	–	18	.379
Loyola (IL)	3	–	11	.214	10	–	19	.345
Detroit Mercy	2	–	12	.143	9	–	19	.321
† 1991 MCC tournament winner Rankings from AP Poll

The 1991 Midwestern Collegiate Conference men's basketball tournament (now known as the Horizon League men's basketball tournament) was held March 7–9 at UD Arena in Dayton, Ohio.

Xavier defeated Saint Louis in the championship game, 81–65, to win their sixth MCC/Horizon League men's basketball tournament title.

The Musketeers received an automatic bid to the 1991 NCAA tournament as the #14 seed in the Midwest region.

== Format ==
All eight conference members participated in the tournament and were seeded based on regular season conference records.

== Bracket ==
Quarterfinals; Friday, March 7
1	Xavier	66
8	Detroit	59
4	Dayton	71
5	Evansville	59
3	Saint Louis	92
6	Marquette	82
7	Loyola-Chicago	75
2	Butler	62

Semifinals; Saturday, March 8
1	Xavier	90
4	Dayton	71
6	Loyola-Chicago	78
2	Saint Louis	89

Championship; Sunday, March 9
1	Xavier	81
2	Saint Louis	65
