= Eric Manuel =

American basketball player (born 1968)

Personal information
- Born: December 21, 1968 (age 57) Macon, Georgia, U.S.
- Listed height: 6 ft 6 in (1.98 m)

Career information
- High school: Southwest (Macon, Georgia)
- College: Kentucky (1987–1988); Hiwassee College (1989–1990); Oklahoma City (1990–1992)
- NBA draft: 1991: undrafted
- Position: Small forward / shooting guard

Career highlights
- 2× NAIA champion (1991, 1992); NAIA tournament MVP (1991); McDonald's All-American (1987); First-team Parade All-American (1987); Third-team Parade All-American (1986); Mr. Georgia Basketball (1985)

Eric Manuel (born December 21, 1968) is an American former college basketball player.

Born in Macon, Georgia; Manuel made the Parade and McDonald's All-America teams as a high school senior in 1987. The 6-foot-6-inch (1.98 m) small forward/shooting guard signed with the Kentucky Wildcats, and broke into the starting lineup by the middle of his freshman year. He was named to the all-Southeastern Conference freshman team.

Just before the start of his sophomore season, however, questions surfaced about his college admissions exams. Manuel had fallen short of a qualifying score on his previous attempts to take the SAT and ACT. When he took the ACT at Lafayette High School in Lexington—home to UK—he finally got a passing score. In July 1989, as part of a larger probe into the Wildcat program, the NCAA investigated Manuel's test scores after finding out he had made a dramatic nine-point improvement when he took his last ACT. When Manuel took the ACT at Lafayette High, 211 of a possible 219 answers were the same as those of another student, Chris Shearer. To the NCAA, this suggested that Manuel had cheated. Indeed, according to ACT officials, there was only a two-in-a-million chance that two students' answers could have resembled each other so closely without cheating.

Manuel adamantly denied any wrongdoing, but voluntarily stayed out of the lineup while the investigation progressed so as not to risk Kentucky being forced to forfeit any games if he were declared ineligible. As it turned out, the investigation dragged through the entire 1988–89 season.

It was to no avail. On May 20, 1989, the NCAA placed Kentucky on three years' probation for a number of serious recruiting and academic violations. As part of the ruling, the NCAA took the unprecedented step of banning Manuel from playing another game for any NCAA member school. The NCAA found that Manuel had committed "academic fraud" by cheating on the ACT, and had also lied to the NCAA and university staff. It also forced Kentucky to vacate its two wins in that year's NCAA tournament (though it allowed Kentucky to keep all of its regular season wins), saying that UK should have known Manuel was ineligible. In a separate action, the SEC stripped Kentucky of its 1988 regular season and conference tournament titles.

Raw Recruits, a book that took a critical look at the UK program, noted that there was an empty seat between all students, and that Shearer was right-handed and sitting to Manuel's left. The book's authors, Alexander Wolff and Armen Keteyian, said that Manuel would have had to look over an empty space and Shearer's right arm to copy off of him—something that would not (or should not) have gone unnoticed by Shearer, the five proctors for the test, or other students sitting near them. Shearer reportedly boasted that he'd helped Manuel get into Kentucky. Ed Dove, the public defender who represented Manuel in the NCAA case, believes that Manuel may have been tripped up by signing two answer sheets. He believes Manuel took the test honestly on one, but someone else—without Manuel's knowledge—copied Shearer's answers on the second and sent it to ACT headquarters in Iowa City.

Manuel transferred to Hiwassee College in Tennessee before enrolling at NAIA power Oklahoma City University. The NAIA initially tried to ban Manuel from playing for any of its member schools as well, but ultimately an Oklahoma district court judge said that the NAIA's reasoning was meritless (he noted that numerous players who were not only cleared to play for NAIA schools but actively recruited had backgrounds that included expulsions from other schools and criminal records) and struck down their ban; an NAIA appeal was abandoned after it was clear the organization would pay a huge amount of money for legal costs and definitely lose. He helped lead Oklahoma City to consecutive NAIA National Championships in 1991 and 1992. He was picked up by the New Jersey Nets of the NBA, but could not make the roster. He played for a few years in Europe, then returned to Oklahoma City to work as a sales merchandiser for a Coca-Cola bottling plant. At last report, he was working as a social worker in Oklahoma City.
