= 1990–91 Missouri Tigers men's basketball team =

American college basketball season

1990–91 Missouri Tigers men's basketball

Big Eight tournament champions
- Conference: Big Eight Conference
- Record: 20–10 (8–6 Big 8)
- Head coach: Norm Stewart (24th season)
- Assistant coach: Bob Sundvold
- Home arena: Hearnes Center

1990–91 Big Eight Conference men's basketball standings
	Conf.				Overall
Team	W		L	PCT	W		L	PCT
No. 14 Oklahoma State	10	–	4	.714	24	–	8	.750
No. 12 Kansas	10	–	4	.714	27	–	8	.771
No. 11 Nebraska	9	–	5	.643	26	–	8	.765
Missouri †	8	–	6	.571	20	–	10	.667
Iowa State	6	–	8	.429	12	–	19	.387
Oklahoma	5	–	9	.357	20	–	15	.571
Colorado	5	–	9	.357	19	–	14	.576
Kansas State	3	–	11	.214	13	–	15	.464
† 1991 Big Eight tournament winner As of April 1, 1991; Rankings from AP poll

The 1990–91 Missouri Tigers men's basketball team represented the University of Missouri as a member of the Big Eight Conference during the 1990–91 NCAA men's basketball season. Led by head coach Norm Stewart, the Tigers won the Big Eight tournament title. Ineligible to participate in the NCAA Tournament, the Tigers finished with an overall record of 20–10 (8–6 Big Eight).

== Roster ==
1990–91 Missouri Tigers men's basketball team
Players
Coaches

Pos.	#	Name	Height	Weight	Year	Hometown
F	0	Jevon Crudup	6 ft 9 in (2.06 m)	210 lb (95 kg)	Fr	Kansas City, Missouri
PG	15	Melvin Booker	6 ft 2 in (1.88 m)	185 lb (84 kg)	Fr	Moss Point, Mississippi
F	34	Doug Smith	6 ft 10 in (2.08 m)	220 lb (100 kg)	Sr	Detroit, Michigan
G	44	Anthony Peeler	6 ft 4 in (1.93 m)	205 lb (93 kg)	Jr	Kansas City, Missouri

Head coach

- Norm Stewart (Missouri)

Assistant coach(es)

Legend

- (C) Team captain
- (S) Suspended
- (I) Ineligible
- (W) Walk-on
- Injured
- Current redshirt

== Schedule and results ==
Date time, TV	Rank^{#}	Opponent^{#}	Result	Record	Site (attendance) city, state
Regular season
Nov 27, 1990*	No. 23	at Rutgers	L 60–68	0–1	Louis Brown Athletic Center; Piscataway, New Jersey
Nov 29, 1990*	No. 23	Florida A&M	W 81–52	1–1	Hearnes Center; Columbia, Missouri
Dec 1, 1990*	No. 23	Oregon	W 65–58	2–1	Hearnes Center; Columbia, Missouri
Dec 4, 1990*		at Creighton	L 68–74	2–2	Omaha Civic Auditorium; Omaha, Nebraska
Dec 8, 1990*		No. 3 Arkansas	L 82–95	2–3	Hearnes Center; Columbia, Missouri
Dec 12, 1990*		at Bradley	W 76–60	3–3	Carver Arena; Peoria, Illinois
Dec 19, 1990*		vs. Illinois; Braggin' Rights	L 81–84	3–4	St. Louis Arena (17,253); St. Louis, Missouri
Jan 5, 1991		Oklahoma State	W 80–79 ^{OT}	7–4 (1–0)	Hearnes Center; Columbia, Missouri
Jan 19, 1991		at Kansas; Border War	L 64–91	11–5	Allen Fieldhouse; Lawrence, Kansas
Jan 26, 1991; 3:00 p.m.		Iowa State	W 82–78	13–5	Hearnes Center; Columbia, Missouri
Jan 30, 1991		at No. 11 Nebraska	L 75–89	13–6	Bob Devaney Sports Center; Lincoln, Nebraska
Feb 16, 1991		at No. 21 Oklahoma State	L 56–71	14–9	Gallagher-Iba Arena; Stillwater, Oklahoma
Feb 20, 1991		No. 14 Nebraska	W 91–71	15–9	Hearnes Center; Columbia, Missouri
Feb 23, 1991; 1:00 p.m.		at Iowa State	L 76–89	15–10	Hilton Coliseum; Ames, Iowa
Mar 2, 1991		Colorado	W 76–51	16–10 (8–6)	Hearnes Center; Columbia, Missouri
Mar 4, 1991*		Notre Dame	W 84–54	17–10	Hearnes Center; Columbia, Missouri
Big Eight Conference tournament
Mar 8, 1991*; 12:10 p.m.		vs. Iowa State; Big Eight tournament Quarterfinal	W 97–81	18–10	Kemper Arena; Kansas City, Missouri
Mar 9, 1991*		vs. No. 14 Oklahoma State; Big Eight tournament Semifinal	W 94–92 ^{2OT}	19–10	Kemper Arena; Kansas City, Missouri
Mar 10, 1991*		vs. No. 13 Nebraska; Big Eight tournament championship	W 90–82	20–10	Kemper Arena; Kansas City, Missouri
*Non-conference game. ^{#}Rankings from AP. (#) Tournament seedings in parentheses. All times are in Central.

== Awards ==
- Doug Smith – Big Eight Player of the Year, All-American
