= 1990–91 Iowa State Cyclones men's basketball team =

American college basketball season

1990–91 Iowa State Cyclones men's basketball
- Conference: Big Eight Conference
- Record: 12-19 (6-8 Big Eight)
- Head coach: Johnny Orr (11th season)
- Home arena: Hilton Coliseum

1990–91 Big Eight Conference men's basketball standings
| | Conf. | | | | Overall |
| Team | W | | L | PCT | W | | L | PCT |
|---|---|---|---|---|---|---|---|---|
| No. 14 Oklahoma State | 10 | – | 4 | .714 | 24 | – | 8 | .750 |
| No. 12 Kansas | 10 | – | 4 | .714 | 27 | – | 8 | .771 |
| No. 11 Nebraska | 9 | – | 5 | .643 | 26 | – | 8 | .765 |
| Missouri † | 8 | – | 6 | .571 | 20 | – | 10 | .667 |
| Iowa State | 6 | – | 8 | .429 | 12 | – | 19 | .387 |
| Oklahoma | 5 | – | 9 | .357 | 20 | – | 15 | .571 |
| Colorado | 5 | – | 9 | .357 | 19 | – | 14 | .576 |
| Kansas State | 3 | – | 11 | .214 | 13 | – | 15 | .464 |
† 1991 Big Eight tournament winner As of April 1, 1991; Rankings from AP poll

The 1990–91 Iowa State Cyclones men's basketball team represented Iowa State University during the 1990–91 NCAA Division I men's basketball season. The Cyclones were coached by Johnny Orr, who was in his 11th season. They played their home games at Hilton Coliseum in Ames, Iowa.

They finished the season 12–19, 6–8 in Big Eight play to finish in fifth place. They lost to fourth-seeded Missouri in the 1991 Big Eight conference tournament quarterfinals.

Games were televised by ESPN, Raycom Sports, the Cyclone Television Network, the Hawkeye Television Network, KWWL and Prime Sports.

== Previous season ==
The previous season the Cyclones finished the season 10–18, 4–10 in Big Eight play to finish in sixth place. They lost to Kansas in the 1990 Big Eight conference tournament quarterfinals.

== Roster ==
Roster
| Name | Position |
|---|---|
| Victor Alexander | Center |
| Doug Collins | Guard |
| Justus Thigpen | Guard |
| Paul Doerrfeld | Forward |
| Phil Kunz | Center |
| Brian Pearson | Guard |
| Norman Brown | Forward |
| Skip McCoy | Guard |
| Donnell Bivens | Forward |
| Mike Bergman | Forward |
| Brad Pippett | Forward |
| Mark Chappell | Guard |
| Saun Jackson | Forward |
| Greg Hester | Guard |

== Schedule and results ==
| Date time, TV | Rank^{#} | Opponent^{#} | Result | Record | Site city, state |
Exhibition
| November 8, 1990*; 7:00 pm | | Latvian National Team; Exhibition | W 102-94 | | Hilton Coliseum (13,546); Ames, Iowa |
Regular season
| November 23, 1990*; 3:30 pm CT | | at Chaminade; Maui Invitational Quarterfinals | W 115-82 | 1-0 | Lahaina Civic Center; Lahaina, HI |
| November 25, 1990*; 1:00 am CT, ESPN | | vs. No. 13 Syracuse; Maui Invivational Semifinals | L 67-83 | 1-1 | Lahaina Civic Center (2,000); Lahaina, HI |
| November 25, 1990*; 9:00 pm CT | | vs. Santa Clara; Maui Invitation Third Place | L 62-78 | 1-2 | Lahaina Civic Center; Lahaina, HI |
| November 30, 1990*; 6:00 pm CT, Cyclone Television Network | | vs. Houston; Diet Pepsi Tournament of Champions Semifinals | L 72-87 | 1-3 | Charlotte Coliseum; Charlotte, North Carolina |
| December 1, 1990*; 6:00 pm, Cyclone Television Network | | vs. No. 4 North Carolina; Diet Pepsi Tournament of Champions Consolation | L 93-118 | 1-4 | Charlotte Coliseum; Charlotte, North Carolina |
| December 3, 1990*; 8:00 pm, Cyclone Television Network | | Minnesota | L 70-84 | 1-5 | Hilton Coliseum; Ames, Iowa |
| December 5, 1990*; 7:30 pm, Cyclone Television Network | | at Baylor | L 72-91 | 1-6 | Ferrell Center; Waco, Texas |
| December 8, 1990*; 7:00 pm, Hawkeye Television Network | | at Iowa; Cy-Hawk Rivalry | L 73-75 | 1-7 | Carver–Hawkeye Arena; Iowa City, Iowa |
| December 11, 1990*; 7:00 pm, NISN (KWWL) | | at Northern Iowa; Iowa Big Four | L 62-68 | 1-8 | UNI-Dome; Cedar Falls, Iowa |
| December 15, 1990*; 1:00 pm, Cyclone Television Network | | Michigan | W 81-72 | 2-8 | Hilton Coliseum; Ames, Iowa |
| December 21, 1990*; 7:00 pm, Cyclone Television Network | | No. 6 Indiana | L 76-87 | 2-9 | Hilton Coliseum; Ames, Iowa |
| December 27, 1990*; 6:00 pm, Cyclone Television Network | | vs. Temple; Fiesta Bowl Classic Semifinals | W 81-79 ^{OT} | 3-9 | McKale Center; Tucson, Arizona |
| December 29, 1990*; Cyclone Television Network | | at No. 4 Arizona; Fiesta Bowl Classic Championship | L 77-102 | 3-10 | McKale Center; Tucson, Arizona |
| January 2, 1991; 7:00 pm, Cyclone Television Network | | Drake; Iowa Big Four | W 86-69 | 4-10 | Hilton Coliseum; Ames, Iowa |
| January 5, 1991; 8:00 pm, Cyclone Television Network | | Colorado | L 81-105 | 4-11 (0-1) | Coors Events Center; Boulder, Colorado |
| January 8, 1991*; 7:00 pm, Cyclone Television Network | | at Creighton | W 97-88 | 5-11 | Omaha Civic Auditorium; Omaha, Nebraska |
| January 12, 1991; 1:00 pm, Raycom | | at No. 18 Nebraska | L 87-97 | 5-12 (0-2) | Devaney Sports Center; Lincoln, Nebraska |
| January 15, 1991*; 7:00 pm, Cyclone Television Network | | Illinois-Chicago | W 76-66 | 6-12 | Hilton Coliseum; Ames, Iowa |
| January 19, 1991; 7:00 pm, Cyclone Television Network | | Kansas State | W 94-91 | 7-12 (1-2) | Hilton Coliseum; Ames, Iowa |
Exhibition
| January 22, 1991*; 7:00 pm | | Marathon Oil; Exhibition | W 83-79 | | Hilton Coliseum; Ames, Iowa |
Regular season
| January 26, 1991; 3:00 pm, Raycom | | at Missouri | L 78-82 | 7-13 (1-3) | Hearnes Center; Columbia, Missouri |
| January 30, 1991; 7:00 pm, Cyclone Television Network | | No. 21 Oklahoma | W 82-79 | 8-13 (2-3) | Hilton Coliseum; Ames, Iowa |
| February 2, 1991; 1:00 pm, Raycom | | No. 24 Kansas | L 78-85 | 8-14 (2-4) | Hilton Coliseum; Ames, Iowa |
| February 6, 1991; 7:00 pm, PSN | | at No. 22 Oklahoma State | L 62-83 | 8-15 (2-5) | Gallagher-Iba Arena; Stillwater, Oklahoma |
| February 9, 1991; 1:00 pm, Raycom | | at Kansas State | W 98-78 | 9-15 (3-5) | Bramlage Coliseum; Manhattan, Kansas |
| February 13, 1991; 7:00 pm, Cyclone Television Network | | No. 17 Nebraska | L 57-65 | 9-16 (3-6) | Hilton Coliseum; Ames, Iowa |
| February 16, 1991; 1:00 pm, Raycom | | Colorado | L 78-84 | 9-17 (3-7) | Hilton Coliseum; Ames, Iowa |
| February 20, 1991; 8:00 pm, Cyclone Television Network | | at Oklahoma | W 97-88 | 10-17 (4-7) | Lloyd Noble Center; Norman, Oklahoma |
| February 23, 1991; 1:00 pm, Raycom | | Missouri | W 89-76 | 11-17 (5-7) | Hilton Coliseum; Ames, Iowa |
| February 26, 1991; 6:30 pm, ESPN | | at No. 10 Kansas | L 57-88 | 11-18 (5-8) | Allen Fieldhouse; Lawrence, Kansas |
| March 2, 1991; 7:00 pm, Cyclone Television Network | | at No. 12 Oklahoma State | W 68-67 | 12-18 (6-8) | Hilton Coliseum; Ames, Iowa |
Big Eight tournament
| March 8, 1991; 12:10 pm, Raycom | | vs. Missouri; Big Eight tournament Quarterfinals | L 81-97 | 12-19 | Kemper Arena; Kansas City, Missouri |
*Non-conference game. ^{#}Rankings from AP poll. (#) Tournament seedings in parentheses. All times are in Central Time.

== Awards and honors ==
- All-Big Eight Selections
  Victor Alexander (1st, AP, UPI)
  Doug Collins (HM, AP, UPI)
- NBA Draft Pick
  Victor Alexander – Golden State (1st round, 17th pick)
- Academic All-Big Eight
  Phil Kunz
- Ralph Olsen Award
  Victor Alexander
