= Middleton Township, Ohio =

Middleton Township, Ohio may refer to:

- Middleton Township, Columbiana County, Ohio
- Middleton Township, Wood County, Ohio

== See also ==
- Middleton, Ohio (disambiguation)
