= 1990–91 Purdue Boilermakers men's basketball team =

American college basketball season

1990–91 Purdue Boilermakers men's basketball

1991 NCAA Division I men's basketball tournament
- Conference: Big Ten Conference
- Record: 17–12 (9–9 Big Ten)
- Head coach: Gene Keady (11th season)
- Assistant coaches: Bruce Weber (11th season); Tom Reiter (5th season); Steve Lavin (3rd season)
- Home arena: Mackey Arena

1990–91 Big Ten Conference men's basketball standings
	Conf.				Overall
Team	W		L	PCT	W		L	PCT
No. 5 Ohio State	15	–	3	.833	27	–	4	.871
No. 3 Indiana	15	–	3	.833	29	–	5	.853
Illinois	11	–	7	.611	21	–	10	.677
Michigan State	11	–	7	.611	19	–	11	.633
Iowa	9	–	9	.500	21	–	11	.656
Purdue	9	–	9	.500	17	–	12	.586
Wisconsin	8	–	10	.444	15	–	15	.500
Michigan	7	–	11	.389	14	–	15	.483
Minnesota	5	–	13	.278	12	–	16	.429
Northwestern	0	–	18	.000	5	–	23	.179
Rankings from AP Poll

The 1990–91 Purdue Boilermakers men's basketball team represented Purdue University during the 1990–91 college basketball season. Led by head coach Gene Keady, the Boilermakers earned the #7 seed in the Midwest Region of the NCAA tournament, but were defeated in the first round by Temple, finishing the season with a 17–12 record (9–9 Big Ten).

== Roster ==
1990–91 Purdue Boilermakers men's basketball team
Players
Coaches

Pos.	#	Name	Height	Weight	Year	Hometown
G	12	Matt Painter	6 ft 6 in (1.98 m)	—	So	Ft. Wayne, Indiana
G/F	32	Jimmy Oliver	6 ft 5 in (1.96 m)	200 lb (91 kg)	Jr	Morrilton, Arkansas

Head coach

- Gene Keady (Kansas State)

Assistant coach(es)

- Bruce Weber (Milwaukee)
- Tom Reiter (Wisconsin)
- Steve Lavin

Legend

- (C) Team captain
- (S) Suspended
- (I) Ineligible
- (W) Walk-on
- Injured
- Current redshirt

== Schedule and results ==
Date time, TV	Rank^{#}	Opponent^{#}	Result	Record	Site city, state
Non-conference regular season
Nov 24, 1990*		Stetson	L 56–58	0–1	Mackey Arena; West Lafayette, Indiana
Nov 26, 1990*		UMass	W 64–53	1–1	Mackey Arena; West Lafayette, Indiana
Nov 30, 1990*		East Carolina	W 78–49	2–1	Mackey Arena; West Lafayette, Indiana
Dec 1, 1990*		Indiana State	W 77–56	3–1	Mackey Arena; West Lafayette, Indiana
Dec 6, 1990*		at California	W 66–65	4–1	Harmon Gym; Berkeley, California
Dec 8, 1990*		at Saint Louis	W 97–77	5–1	Kiel Auditorium; St. Louis, Missouri
Dec 15, 1990*		Furman	W 64–51	6–1	Mackey Arena; West Lafayette, Indiana
Dec 20, 1990*		Butler	W 97–81	7–1	Mackey Arena; West Lafayette, Indiana
Dec 22, 1990*		No. 8 North Carolina	L 74–86	7–2	Mackey Arena; West Lafayette, Indiana
Dec 29, 1990*		at No. 17 Georgia	W 64–63	8–2	Stegeman Coliseum; Athens, Georgia
Big Ten Regular Season
Jan 3, 1991		at Northwestern	W 73–70	9–2 (1–0)	Welsh-Ryan Arena; Evanston, Illinois
Jan 14, 1991		No. 3 Indiana; Rivalry	L 62–65	10–4 (2–2)	Mackey Arena; West Lafayette, Indiana
Feb 10, 1991		at No. 4 Indiana; Rivalry	L 63–81	11–10 (3–8)	Assembly Hall; Bloomington, Indiana
Mar 9, 1991		Northwestern	W 77–48	17–11 (9–9)	Mackey Arena; West Lafayette, Indiana
NCAA Tournament
Mar 14, 1991*	(7 E)	vs. (10 E) Temple; First Round	L 63–80	17–12	Cole Fieldhouse; College Park, Maryland
*Non-conference game. ^{#}Rankings from AP Poll. (#) Tournament seedings in parentheses. E=East.

== Team players drafted into the NBA ==
For the second consecutive year, a Purdue player was taken with the 39th overall pick.

Round	Pick	Player	NBA club
2	39	Jimmy Oliver	Cleveland Cavaliers
