= 1990–91 Xavier Musketeers men's basketball team =

American college basketball season

1990–91 Xavier Musketeers men's basketball

MCC Regular season champions MCC tournament champions

NCAA tournament, second round
- Conference: Midwestern Collegiate Conference
- Record: 22–10 (11–3 MCC)
- Head coach: Pete Gillen (6th season)
- Assistant coach: Dino Gaudio (4th season)
- Home arena: Cincinnati Gardens

1990–91 Midwestern Collegiate Conference men's basketball standings
	Conf.				Overall
Team	W		L	PCT	W		L	PCT
Xavier †	11	–	3	.786	22	–	10	.688
Butler	10	–	4	.714	18	–	11	.621
Saint Louis	8	–	6	.571	19	–	14	.576
Dayton	8	–	6	.571	14	–	15	.483
Evansville	7	–	7	.500	14	–	14	.500
Marquette	7	–	7	.500	11	–	18	.379
Loyola (IL)	3	–	11	.214	10	–	19	.345
Detroit Mercy	2	–	12	.143	9	–	19	.321
† 1991 MCC tournament winner Rankings from AP Poll

The 1990–91 Xavier Musketeers men's basketball team represented Xavier University from Cincinnati, Ohio in the 1990–91 season. Led by head coach Pete Gillen, the Musketeers finished with a 22–10 record (11–3 MCC), won the MCC regular season and conference tournament titles, and received an automatic bid to the NCAA tournament as the #14 seed in the Midwest region. In the NCAA tournament, the Musketeers defeated #3 seed Nebraska, then lost to #11 seed Connecticut in the second round.

== Roster ==
1990–91 Xavier Musketeers men's basketball team
Players
Coaches

Pos.	#	Name	Height	Weight	Year	Hometown
G	10	Jamal Walker	5 ft 11 in (1.8 m)	—	Sr
G	22	Jamie Gladden	6 ft 0 in (1.83 m)	—	So
F/C	33	Brian Grant	6 ft 9 in (2.06 m)	240 lb (109 kg)	Fr	Georgetown, Ohio
F	44	Aaron Williams	6 ft 9 in (2.06 m)	210 lb (95 kg)	So	Rolling Meadows, Illinois

Head coach

- Pete Gillen (Fairfield)

Assistant coach(es)

Legend

- (C) Team captain
- (S) Suspended
- (I) Ineligible
- (W) Walk-on
- Injured
- Current redshirt

== Schedule and results ==
Date time, TV	Rank^{#}	Opponent^{#}	Result	Record	Site city, state
Regular season
Nov 24, 1990*		Mount St. Mary's	W 103–96	1–0	Cincinnati Gardens; Cincinnati, Ohio
Nov 26, 1990*		Bethune-Cookman	W 82–56	2–0	Cincinnati Gardens; Cincinnati, Ohio
Nov 28, 1990*		Ball State	L 94–100	2–1	Cincinnati Gardens; Cincinnati, Ohio
Dec 1, 1990*		at Canisius	W 62–59	3–1	Koessler Athletic Center; Buffalo, New York
Dec 5, 1990*		Loyola (MD)	W 87–68	4–1	Cincinnati Gardens; Cincinnati, Ohio
Dec 8, 1990*		Miami (OH)	L 95–100	4–2	Cincinnati Gardens; Cincinnati, Ohio
Dec 22, 1990*		Winthrop	W 83–53	5–2	Cincinnati Gardens; Cincinnati, Ohio
Dec 30, 1990		Detroit	W 91–66	6–2 (1–0)	Cincinnati Gardens; Cincinnati, Ohio
Jan 2, 1991*		New Hampshire	W 75–54	7–2	Cincinnati Gardens; Cincinnati, Ohio
Jan 5, 1991*		at Fordham	L 74–87	7–3	Rose Hill Gym; Bronx, New York
Jan 10, 1991		at Marquette	W 98–93	8–3 (2–0)	Bradley Center; Milwaukee, Wisconsin
Jan 12, 1991		at Loyola (IL)	W 81–74	9–3 (3–0)	Rosemont Horizon; Rosemont, Illinois
Jan 14, 1991*		UMass	W 71–66	10–3	Cincinnati Gardens; Cincinnati, Ohio
Jan 17, 1991		Evansville	W 100–85	11–3 (4–0)	Cincinnati Gardens; Cincinnati, Ohio
Jan 19, 1991		Saint Louis	L 56–58	11–4 (4–1)	Cincinnati Gardens; Cincinnati, Ohio
Jan 24, 1991		at Detroit	W 69–67	12–4 (5–1)	Calihan Hall; Detroit, Michigan
Jan 26, 1991*		at South Florida	L 88–92	12–5	Sun Dome; Tampa, Florida
Jan 30, 1991*		at Cincinnati	L 56–69	12–6	Fifth Third Arena; Cincinnati, Ohio
Feb 2, 1991		at Saint Louis	L 74–95	12–7 (5–2)	Kiel Auditorium; St. Louis, Missouri
Feb 7, 1991		Marquette	W 71–66	13–7 (6–2)	Cincinnati Gardens; Cincinnati, Ohio
Feb 9, 1991		Loyola (IL)	W 87–74	14–7 (7–2)	Cincinnati Gardens; Cincinnati, Ohio
Feb 12, 1991		Butler	W 80–73	15–7 (8–2)	Cincinnati Gardens; Cincinnati, Ohio
Feb 14, 1991		at Evansville	W 69–56	16–7 (9–2)	Roberts Stadium; Evansville, Indiana
Feb 17, 1991		at Dayton	L 79–83	16–8 (9–3)	UD Arena; Dayton, Ohio
Feb 19, 1991		at Wright State	L 83–91	16–9	Ervin J. Nutter Center; Fairborn, Ohio
Feb 23, 1991		at Butler	W 105–93	17–9 (10–3)	Hinkle Fieldhouse; Indianapolis, Indiana
Mar 2, 1991		Dayton	W 102–79	18–9 (11–3)	Cincinnati Gardens; Cincinnati, Ohio
Midwestern Collegiate Conference tournament
Mar 7, 1991*	(1)	vs. (8) Detroit; Quarterfinals	W 66–59	19–9	UD Arena; Dayton, Ohio
Mar 8, 1991*	(1)	at (4) Dayton; Semifinals	W 90–71	20–9	UD Arena; Dayton, Ohio
Mar 9, 1991*	(1)	vs. (2) Saint Louis; Championship	W 81–65	21–9	UD Arena; Dayton, Ohio
NCAA Tournament
Mar 14, 1991*	(14 MW)	vs. (3 MW) No. 11 Nebraska; First Round	W 89–84	22–9	Hubert H. Humphrey Metrodome; Minneapolis, Minnesota
Mar 16, 1991*	(14 MW)	vs. (11 MW) Connecticut; Second Round	L 50–66	22–10	Hubert H. Humphrey Metrodome; Minneapolis, Minnesota
*Non-conference game. ^{#}Rankings from AP poll. (#) Tournament seedings in parentheses. MW=Midwest. All times are in Eastern Time.
