= Demetrius Calip =

American basketball player (1969–2023)

Personal information
- Born: November 18, 1969 Flint, Michigan, U.S.
- Died: February 5, 2023 (aged 53)
- Listed height: 6 ft 1 in (1.85 m)
- Listed weight: 165 lb (75 kg)

Career information
- High school: Flint Northern (Flint, Michigan)
- College: Michigan (1987–1991)
- NBA draft: 1991: undrafted
- Playing career: 1991–1995
- Position: Point guard
- Number: 7

Career history
- 1991: Los Angeles Lakers
- 1991: Rapid City Thrillers
- 1991–1992: Yakima Sun Kings
- 1993–1994: Columbus Horizon
- 1994–1995: Mexico Aztecas
- Stats at NBA.com
- Stats at Basketball Reference

Demetrius Arvell Calip (November 18, 1969 – February 5, 2023) was an American professional basketball player. Born in Flint, Michigan, he helped the University of Michigan Wolverines to the 1989 Men's Division I Basketball Championship. As a member of the 1988–1989 National Champions, his teammates included Glen Rice, Terry Mills, Loy Vaught, Rumeal Robinson, Sean Higgins, and Rob Pelinka. As a member of the 1990–91 team he led the team in scoring, assists and minutes. Other Michigan teammates included Eric Riley and Gary Grant.

Calip appeared in the basketball-themed films Blue Chips (1994) and Eddie (1996).

Calip died on February 5, 2023, at age 53.
