= 1990–91 Oklahoma State Cowboys basketball team =

American college basketball season

1990–91 Oklahoma State Cowboys basketball

Big Eight Regular season co-champions

NCAA tournament, Sweet Sixteen
- Conference: Big Eight Conference

Ranking
- Coaches: No. 13
- AP: No. 14
- Record: 24–8 (10–4 Big Eight)
- Head coach: Eddie Sutton (1st season)
- Assistant coaches: Bill Self (5th season); Rob Evans (1st season); Russ Pennell (1st season)
- Home arena: Gallagher-Iba Arena (Capacity: 6,381)

1990–91 Big Eight Conference men's basketball standings
	Conf.				Overall
Team	W		L	PCT	W		L	PCT
No. 14 Oklahoma State	10	–	4	.714	24	–	8	.750
No. 12 Kansas	10	–	4	.714	27	–	8	.771
No. 11 Nebraska	9	–	5	.643	26	–	8	.765
Missouri †	8	–	6	.571	20	–	10	.667
Iowa State	6	–	8	.429	12	–	19	.387
Oklahoma	5	–	9	.357	20	–	15	.571
Colorado	5	–	9	.357	19	–	14	.576
Kansas State	3	–	11	.214	13	–	15	.464
† 1991 Big Eight tournament winner As of April 1, 1991; Rankings from AP poll

The 1990–91 Oklahoma State Cowboys basketball team represented Oklahoma State University as a member of the Big Eight Conference during the 1990–91 NCAA Division I men's basketball season. The team was led by head coach Eddie Sutton and played their home games at Gallagher-Iba Arena. The Cowboys finished with a record of 24–8 (10–4 Big Eight) and won the Big Eight regular season title.

Oklahoma State received an at-large bid to the NCAA tournament as No. 3 seed in the East region. After defeating New Mexico in the opening round, the school's first NCAA Tournament win in 26 years, the Cowboys defeated NC State to reach the Sweet Sixteen. The run ended in the East regional semifinal, as Temple defeated OSU to reach the Elite Eight.

== Roster ==
1990–91 Oklahoma State Cowboys men's basketball team
Players
Coaches

Pos.	#	Name	Height	Weight	Year	Previous school	Hometown
G	5	Corey Williams	6 ft 2 in (1.88 m)	185 lb (84 kg)	Jr	Northeast	Macon, Georgia
G	20	Sean Sutton	—	—	Jr
PF	35	Byron Houston	6 ft 5 in (1.96 m)	240 lb (109 kg)	Jr	Star Spencer	Spencer, Oklahoma

Head coach

- Eddie Sutton

Assistant coach(es)

Legend

- (C) Team captain
- (S) Suspended
- (I) Ineligible
- (W) Walk-on
- Injured
- Current redshirt

== Schedule and results ==
Date time, TV	Rank^{#}	Opponent^{#}	Result	Record	Site (attendance) city, state
Non-conference regular season
November 24, 1990*		Colgate	W 111–47	1–0	Gallagher-Iba Arena; Stillwater, OK
November 27, 1990*		at New Orleans	W 74–64	2–0	Lakefront Arena; New Orleans, LA
December 1, 1990*		Tulsa	W 75–73	3–0	Gallagher-Iba Arena; Stillwater, OK
December 5, 1990*		Centenary	W 110–58	4–0	Gallagher-Iba Arena; Stillwater, OK
December 8, 1990*		at Wichita State	L 69–72	4–1	Levitt Arena; Wichita, KS
December 13, 1990*		Louisiana Tech	W 89–58	5–1	Gallagher-Iba Arena; Stillwater, OK
December 15, 1990*		Grambling State	W 98–54	6–1	Gallagher-Iba Arena; Stillwater, OK
December 19, 1990*		Jacksonville	W 91–58	7–1	Gallagher-Iba Arena; Stillwater, OK
December 22, 1990*		vs. Southern Illinois; Old Style Classic	L 73–85	7–2	Rosemont Horizon; Rosemont, IL
December 23, 1990*		at DePaul; Old Style Classic	W 72–70	8–2	Rosemont Horizon; Rosemont, IL
December 30, 1990*		at Marquette	W 70–43	9–2	Bradley Center; Milwaukee, WI
January 2, 1991*		at Missouri-Kansas City	W 84–67	10–2	Municipal Auditorium; Kansas City, MO
Big Eight regular season
January 5, 1991		at Missouri	L 79–80 ^{OT}	10–3 (0–1)	Hearnes Center; Columbia, MO
January 12, 1991		Kansas	W 78–73 ^{OT}	11–3 (1–1)	Gallagher-Iba Arena; Stillwater, OK
January 19, 1991		at No. 11 Oklahoma; Bedlam Series	L 72–76	11–4 (1–2)	Lloyd Noble Center; Norman, OK
January 23, 1991*		Southeastern Louisiana	W 88–46	12–4	Gallagher-Iba Arena; Stillwater, OK
January 26, 1991		Kansas State	W 85–70	13–4 (2–2)	Gallagher-Iba Arena; Stillwater, OK
January 30, 1991		at Colorado	W 76–66	14–4 (3–2)	Coors Events/Conference Center; Boulder, CO
February 2, 1991		at No. 11 Nebraska	W 81–68	15–4 (4–2)	Bob Devaney Sports Center; Lincoln, NE
February 6, 1991	No. 22	Iowa State	W 83–62	16–4 (5–2)	Gallagher-Iba Arena; Stillwater, OK
February 9, 1991	No. 22	at No. 18 Kansas	L 69–79	16–5 (5–3)	Allen Fieldhouse; Lawrence, KS
February 13, 1991	No. 21	Oklahoma; Bedlam Series	W 77–74	17–5 (6–3)	Gallagher-Iba Arena; Stillwater, OK
February 16, 1991	No. 21	Missouri	W 71–56	18–5 (7–3)	Gallagher-Iba Arena; Stillwater, OK
February 19, 1991	No. 16	at Kansas State	W 76–65	19–5 (8–3)	Bramlage Coliseum; Manhattan, KS
February 24, 1991	No. 16	Colorado	W 79–67	20–5 (9–3)	Gallagher-Iba Arena; Stillwater, OK
February 27, 1991	No. 12	No. 15 Nebraska	W 80–69	21–5 (10–3)	Gallagher-Iba Arena; Stillwater, OK
March 2, 1991	No. 12	at Iowa State	L 67–68	21–6 (10–4)	Hilton Coliseum; Ames, IA
Big Eight tournament
March 8, 1991*	(1) No. 14	vs. (8) Kansas State; Quarterfinals	W 77–66	22–6	Kemper Arena; Kansas City, MO
March 9, 1991*	(1) No. 14	vs. (4) Missouri; Semifinals	L 92–94 ^{2OT}	22–7	Kemper Arena; Kansas City, MO
NCAA tournament
March 14, 1991*	(3 E) No. 14	vs. (14 E) New Mexico; First Round	W 67–54	23–7	Cole Fieldhouse; College Park, MD
March 16, 1991*	(3 E) No. 14	vs. (6 E) NC State; Second Round	W 73–64	24–7	Cole Fieldhouse; College Park, MD
March 22, 1991*	(3 E) No. 14	vs. (10 E) Temple; Sweet Sixteen	L 63–72 ^{OT}	24–8	Brendan Byrne Arena; East Rutherford, NJ
*Non-conference game. ^{#}Rankings from AP Poll. (#) Tournament seedings in parentheses. E=East. All times are in Eastern Time.

== Awards and honors ==
- Byron Houston – Big Eight co-Player of the Year
