= 1990–91 Marquette Warriors men's basketball team =

American college basketball season

1990–91 Marquette Warriors men's basketball
- Conference: Midwestern Collegiate Conference
- Record: 11–18 (7–7 MW Coll)
- Head coach: Kevin O'Neill (2nd season)
- Home arena: Bradley Center

1990–91 Midwestern Collegiate Conference men's basketball standings
	Conf.				Overall
Team	W		L	PCT	W		L	PCT
Xavier †	11	–	3	.786	22	–	10	.688
Butler	10	–	4	.714	18	–	11	.621
Saint Louis	8	–	6	.571	19	–	14	.576
Dayton	8	–	6	.571	14	–	15	.483
Evansville	7	–	7	.500	14	–	14	.500
Marquette	7	–	7	.500	11	–	18	.379
Loyola (IL)	3	–	11	.214	10	–	19	.345
Detroit Mercy	2	–	12	.143	9	–	19	.321
† 1991 MCC tournament winner Rankings from AP Poll

The 1990–91 Marquette Warriors men's basketball team represented Marquette University during the 1990–91 men's college basketball season.

== Schedule ==
Date time, TV	Rank^{#}	Opponent^{#}	Result	Record	Site city, state
November 14*		at No. 6 Duke; Preseason NIT	L 74–87	0–1	Cameron Indoor Stadium (9,341); Durham, NC
December 1*		at Kansas	L 71–108	0–2	Allen Fieldhouse (15,600); Lawrence, Kansas
December 4*		Wisconsin	W 69–58	1–2	Bradley Center (16,536); Milwaukee, WI
December 7*		Mississippi Valley State	W 96–71	2–2	Bradley Center (12,726); Milwaukee, WI
December 8*		Little Rock	W 75–44	3–2	Bradley Center (13,597); Milwaukee, WI
December 19*		Prairie View	W 95–68	4–2	Bradley Center (11,364); Milwaukee, WI
December 22*		at Michigan	L 81–89	4–3	Crisler Arena (10,854); Ann Arbor, Michigan
December 30*		Oklahoma State	L 43–70	4–4	Bradley Center (12,919); Milwaukee, WI
January 2*		No. 18 Virginia	L 88–94	4–5	Bradley Center (12,785); Milwaukee, WI
January 5		at Dayton	L 81–103	4–6	University of Dayton Arena (12,747); Dayton, Ohio
January 7*		at DePaul	L 63–68	4–7	Allstate Arena (9,367); Rosemont, Illinois
January 10		Xavier	L 93–98	4–8	Bradley Center (12,837); Milwaukee, WI
January 17*		at Notre Dame	L 73–80	4–9	Joyce Center (9,621); South Bend, IN
January 19		Loyola (IL)	W 82–36	5–9	Bradley Center (13,860); Milwaukee, WI
January 21*		at North Carolina State	L 76–89	5–10	Reynolds Coliseum (7,600); Raleigh, NC
January 24		at Evansville	W 68–57	6–10	Roberts Municipal Stadium (10,842); Evansville, Indiana
January 26		at Saint Louis	L 69–73	6–11	Kiel Auditorium (8,457); St. Louis, Missouri
January 28*		DePaul	L 56–84	6–12	Bradley Center (13,368); Milwaukee, WI
January 31		Detroit Mercy	W 75–54	7–12	Bradley Center (12,062); Milwaukee, WI
February 2		Butler	L 65–76	7–13	Bradley Center (12,999); Milwaukee, WI
February 7		at Xavier	L 66–71	7–14	Cincinnati Gardens (6,485); Cincinnati, Ohio
February 9		Dayton	W 67–65	8–14	Bradley Center (14,708); Milwaukee, WI
February 12*		Notre Dame	L 62–63	8–15	Bradley Center (14,933); Milwaukee, WI
February 17		at Loyola (IL)	W 75–70	9–15	Alumni Gym (5,163); Chicago, IL
February 21		Evansville	L 55–59	9–16	Bradley Center (12,526); Milwaukee, WI
February 23		Saint Louis	W 72–69	10–16	Bradley Center (14,279); Milwaukee, WI
February 28		at Detroit Mercy	W 74–68	11–16	Calihan Hall (2,946); Detroit, Michigan
March 2		at Butler	L 74–84	11–17	Hinkle Fieldhouse (3,393); Indianapolis, Indiana
March 7		vs. Saint Louis; Midwestern Collegiate Conference Tournament • Quarterfinal	L 82–92	11–18	University of Dayton Arena (10,426); Dayton, Ohio
*Non-conference game. ^{#}Rankings from AP Poll. (#) Tournament seedings in parentheses.
