= 1990–91 Wisconsin Badgers men's basketball team =

American college basketball season

1990–91 Wisconsin Badgers men's basketball

National Invitation Tournament, Second Round
- Conference: Big Ten Conference
- Record: 15–15 (8–10 Big Ten)
- Head coach: Steve Yoder (9th season)
- Home arena: Wisconsin Field House

1990–91 Big Ten Conference men's basketball standings
	Conf.				Overall
Team	W		L	PCT	W		L	PCT
No. 5 Ohio State	15	–	3	.833	27	–	4	.871
No. 3 Indiana	15	–	3	.833	29	–	5	.853
Illinois	11	–	7	.611	21	–	10	.677
Michigan State	11	–	7	.611	19	–	11	.633
Iowa	9	–	9	.500	21	–	11	.656
Purdue	9	–	9	.500	17	–	12	.586
Wisconsin	8	–	10	.444	15	–	15	.500
Michigan	7	–	11	.389	14	–	15	.483
Minnesota	5	–	13	.278	12	–	16	.429
Northwestern	0	–	18	.000	5	–	23	.179
Rankings from AP Poll

The 1990–91 Wisconsin Badgers men's basketball team represented the University of Wisconsin as a member of the Big Ten Conference during the 1990–91 NCAA Division I men's basketball season. The team was coached by Steve Yoder, coaching his ninth season with Wisconsin. The Badgers finished 15–15, 8–10 in Big Ten play to finish in seventh place. Wisconsin earned a postseason bid to the National Invitation Tournament for the second time in three seasons.

== Roster ==
1990–91 Wisconsin Badgers men's basketball team
Players
Coaches

Pos.	#	Name	Height	Weight	Year	Hometown
G	3	Jason Johnsen	6 ft 3 in (1.91 m)	192 lb (87 kg)	RS Fr	New Hope, Minnesota
G	4	Larry Hisle	6 ft 5 in (1.96 m)	208 lb (94 kg)	So	Mequon, Wisconsin
G	10	Billy Douglass	6 ft 5 in (1.96 m)	198 lb (90 kg)	RS Jr	Lake Forest, Illinois
G	12	Brian Good	6 ft 1 in (1.85 m)	180 lb (82 kg)	Jr	Rossville, Indiana
G	20	Kass Weaver	6 ft 3 in (1.91 m)	173 lb (78 kg)	Fr	Olympia Fields, Illinois
G	21	Jay Peters	6 ft 2 in (1.88 m)	187 lb (85 kg)	RS Jr	Janesville, Wisconsin
G/F	23	Willie Simms	6 ft 6 in (1.98 m)	210 lb (95 kg)	Sr	Pontiac, Michigan
F	32	Carlton McGee	6 ft 7 in (2.01 m)	202 lb (92 kg)	RS Fr	Milwaukee, Wisconsin
F	33	Louis Ely	6 ft 7 in (2.01 m)	192 lb (87 kg)	So	Harvey, Illinois
F	34	Howard Moore (redshirt)	6 ft 7 in (2.01 m)	191 lb (87 kg)	Fr	Chicago, Illinois
F	40	John Ellenson	6 ft 7 in (2.01 m)	204 lb (93 kg)	RS Sr	Menomonie, Wisconsin
F	41	Damon Harrell	6 ft 9 in (2.06 m)	215 lb (98 kg)	So	Madison, Wisconsin
F	43	Patrick Tompkins	6 ft 6 in (1.98 m)	255 lb (116 kg)	Sr	Waukegan, Illinois
G	44	Tim Locum	6 ft 4 in (1.93 m)	172 lb (78 kg)	Sr	Flora, Illinois
C	52	Grant Johnson	7 ft 0 in (2.13 m)	236 lb (107 kg)	RS Fr	Plymouth, Minnesota

Head coach

- Steve Yoder (Illinois Wesleyan)

Assistant coach(es)

- Ray McCallum (Ball State)
- Jonathan Williams (Ball State)
- Charles Schramm (Northern Illinois)

Legend

- (C) Team captain
- (S) Suspended
- (I) Ineligible
- (W) Walk-on
- Injured
- Current redshirt

*transfer from Ripon College

== Schedule ==
Date time, TV	Rank^{#}	Opponent^{#}	Result	Record	Site city, state
Regular Season
11/24/1990*		at Oregon	W 72–70 ^{OT}	1–0	McArthur Court; Eugene, OR
11/29/1990*		San Francisco State	W 72–53	2–0	UW Fieldhouse; Madison, WI
12/1/1990*		at Portland	W 65–49	3–0	Moody Coliseum; University Park, TX
12/4/1990*		at Marquette	L 58–69	3–1	Bradley Center; Milwaukee, WI
12/8/1990*		Southern Indiana	L 66–78	3–2	UW Fieldhouse; Madison, WI
12/11/1990*		Nebraska	L 63–75	3–3	UW Fieldhouse; Madison, WI
12/15/1990*		at Butler	L 88–94 ^{2OT}	3–4	Hinkle Fieldhouse; Indianapolis, IN
12/22/1990*		Texas–Arlington	W 105–74	4–4	UW Fieldhouse; Madison, WI
12/31/1990*		Tennessee Tech	W 71–65	5–4	UW Fieldhouse; Madison, WI
1/5/1991*		Portland	W 74–50	6–4	UW Fieldhouse; Madison, WI
1/7/1991		Minnesota	W 72–62	7–4 (1–0)	UW Fieldhouse; Madison, WI
1/10/1991		at Michigan State	L 50–65	7–5 (1–1)	Breslin Center; East Lansing, MI
1/12/1991		at No. 4 Ohio State	L 60–92	7–6 (1–2)	St. John Arena; Columbus, OH
1/17/1991		No. 24 Iowa	W 91–79	8–6 (2–2)	UW Fieldhouse; Madison, WI
1/19/1991		Michigan	L 68–69 ^{OT}	8–7 (2–3)	UW Fieldhouse; Madison, WI
1/24/1991		at Northwestern	W 74–57	9–7 (3–3)	Welsh–Ryan Arena; Evanston, IL
1/26/1991		Purdue	W 66–44	10–7 (4–3)	UW Fieldhouse; Madison, WI
1/30/1991		at No. 4 Indiana	L 57–73	10–8 (4–4)	Assembly Hall; Bloomington, IN
2/2/1991		at Illinois	L 62–70	10–9 (4–5)	Assembly Hall; Champaign, IL
2/9/1991		No. 25 Michigan State	W 84–78 ^{2OT}	11–9 (5–5)	UW Fieldhouse; Madison, WI
2/14/1991		No. 2 Ohio State	L 71–73	11–10 (5–6)	UW Fieldhouse; Madison, WI
2/16/1991		at Iowa	W 56–55	12–10 (6–6)	Carver–Hawkeye Arena; Iowa City, IA
2/21/1991		at Michigan	L 62–65	12–11 (6–7)	Crisler Arena; Ann Arbor, MI
2/24/1991		Northwestern	W 79–76	13–11 (7–7)	UW Fieldhouse; Madison, WI
2/28/1991		at Purdue	L 62–69	13–12 (7–8)	Mackey Arena; West Lafayette, IN
3/2/1991		No. 5 Indiana	L 61–74	13–13 (7–9)	UW Fieldhouse; Madison, WI
3/6/1991		Illinois	W 85–77	14–13 (8–9)	UW Fieldhouse; Madison, WI
3/9/1991		at Minnesota	L 70–80	14–14 (8–10)	Williams Arena; Minneapolis, MN
National Invitation Tournament
3/13/1991*		Bowling Green; First Round	W 87–79 ^{OT}	15–14	UW Fieldhouse; Madison, WI
3/18/1991*		Stanford; Second Round	L 72–80	15–15	UW Fieldhouse; Madison, WI
*Non-conference game. ^{#}Rankings from AP Poll. (#) Tournament seedings in parentheses.

== Player statistics ==
Individual player statistics (Final)
			Minutes		Scoring		Total FGs			3-point FGs			Free Throws			Rebounds								
Player	GP	GS	Tot	Avg	Pts	Avg	FG	FGA	Pct	3FG	3FA	Pct	FT	FTA	Pct	Off	Def	Tot	Avg	A	TO	Blk	Stl	PF
Simms, Willie	29	28	921	31.8	421	14.5	153	267	.573	1	3	.333	114	179	.637	-	-	149	5.1	98	101	4	27	91
Tompkins, Patrick	30	30	1091	36.4	423	14.1	164	258	.636	0	2	.000	95	147	.646	-	-	264	8.8	78	81	25	23	66
Locum, Tim	30	26	871	29.0	330	11.0	107	212	.505	65	134	.485	51	59	.864	-	-	75	2.5	53	54	3	25	52
Hisle, Larry	28	16	660	23.6	244	8.7	71	170	.418	34	97	.351	68	94	.723	-	-	62	2.2	52	57	1	13	44
Ellenson, John	30	23	712	23.7	202	6.7	71	159	.447	33	87	.379	27	34	.794	-	-	83	2.8	46	45	10	18	55
McGee, Carlton	26	8	380	14.6	130	5.0	51	105	.486	0	0	.000	28	46	.609	-	-	45	1.7	18	32	16	10	44
Good, Brian	13	0	312	24.0	45	3.5	11	29	.379	10	21	.476	13	14	.929	-	-	8	0.6	12	7	0	2	6
Ely, Louis	20	0	177	8.9	65	3.3	27	48	.563	0	0	.000	11	22	.500	-	-	35	1.8	2	14	20	2	17
Peters, Jay	28	6	419	15.0	83	3.0	29	59	.492	18	43	.419	7	11	.636	-	-	24	0.9	50	31	3	21	47
Weaver, Kass	16	0	95	5.9	46	2.9	15	34	.441	10	18	.556	6	9	.667	-	-	14	0.9	4	13	2	3	7
Douglass, Billy	21	13	305	14.5	23	1.1	12	45	.267	3	12	.250	16	21	.762	-	-	23	1.1	30	23	3	8	32
Harrell, Damon	23	2	159	6.9	23	1.0	11	33	.333	0	0	.000	1	7	.143	-	-	32	1.4	6	10	6	4	28
Johnsen, Jason	12	0	41	3.4	6	0.5	2	14	.143	0	5	.000	2	2	1.000	-	-	6	0.5	7	4	0	2	6
Johnson, Grant	8	0	33	4.1	3	0.4	1	2	.500	0	0	.000	1	3	.333	-	-	8	1.0	1	3	3	1	7
Total	30	-	6175	41.2	2123	70.8	743	1476	.503	186	450	.413	451	661	.682	-	-	900	30.0	469	482	96	160	514
Opponents	30	-	6175	41.2	2094	69.8	801	1701	.471	134	370	.362	358	517	.693	-	-	893	29.8	410	386	62	221	569

Legend
GP	Games played	GS	Games started	Tot	Total count	Avg	Average per game	Pts	Points
FG	Field goals made	FGA	Field goal attempts	3FG	3-pointers made	3FA	3-point attempts	FT	Free throws made
FTA	Free throw attempts	Off	Offensive rebounds	Def	Defensive rebounds	A	Assists	TO	Turnovers
Blk	Blocks	Stl	Steals	PF	Personal fouls	Team high

== Awards and honors ==
All-Big Ten

- Patrick Tompkins - 1st Team (media), 2nd Team (coaches)
- Willie Simms - Honorable Mention
