= 1991 NAIA women's basketball tournament =

- Teams: 32
- Finals site: Oman Arena, Jackson, Tennessee
- Champions: Fort Hays State Tigers (1st title, 1st title game, 1st Fab Four)
- Runner-up: SW Oklahoma State Bulldogs (6th title game, 6th Fab Four)
- Semifinalists: Claflin Lady Panthers (4th Fab Four); IUPUI Jaguars (1st Fab Four)
- Coach of the year: John Klein (Fort Hays State)
- Charles Stevenson Hustle Award: Julie Kizzar (Fort Hays State)
- Chuck Taylor MVP: Annette Wiles (Fort Hays State)
- Top scorer: Annette Wiles (Fort Hays State) (150 points)

The 1991 NAIA women's basketball tournament was the 11th annual tournament held by the NAIA to determine the national champion of women's college basketball among its members in the United States and Canada.

Fort Hays State defeated defending champions Southwestern Oklahoma State in the championship game, 57–53, to claim the Tigers' first NAIA national title.

The tournament was played at the Oman Arena in Jackson, Tennessee.

== Qualification ==
The tournament field remained expanded for the second time in its history, increasing from sixteen to thirty-two teams. The top sixteen teams received seeds.

The tournament continue to utilize a simple single-elimination format.

== Bracket ==
First round
1 | Claflin | 104
Seton Hill | 84
Berry | 80
16 | Central Arkansas | 86
9 | St. Edward's | 60
Mobile | 46
Georgian Court | 73
8 | Rosary (IL) | 78
5 | Wayland Baptist | 74
Point Loma Nazarene | 69
St. Joseph's (ME) | 68
12 | Minnesota Duluth | 82
13 | Northern Montana | 61
Campbellsville | 60
Wisconsin–Stout | 58
4 | Fort Hays State | 92
3 | Simon Fraser | 77
IUPUI | 79
Western New Mexico | 67
14 | Midland Lutheran | 97
11 | Central State (OH) | 67
Rockhurst | 61
Charleston (WV) | 49
6 | Wingate | 94
7 | Mount Mercy | 67
Auburn Montgomery | 54
10 | Belmont | 85
Holy Family | 50
15 | Belmont Abbey | 73
Western Oregon | 81
Northwood | 58
2 | SW Oklahoma State | 77

Second round
1 | Claflin | 93
16 | Central Arkansas | 77
9 | St. Edward's | 92
8 | Rosary (IL) | 51
5 | Wayland Baptist | 58
12 | Minnesota Duluth | 51
13 | Northern Montana | 53
4 | Fort Hays State | 70
IUPUI | 99
14 | Midland Lutheran | 79
11 | Central State (OH) | 78
6 | Wingate | 81
7 | Mount Mercy | 83
10 | Belmont | 99
Western Oregon | 55
2 | SW Oklahoma State | 67

Quarterfinals
1 | Claflin | 67
9 | St. Edward's | 66
5 | Wayland Baptist | 65
4 | Fort Hays State | 78
IUPUI | 99
6 | Wingate | 96
10 | Belmont | 65
2 | SW Oklahoma State | 70*

Semifinals
1 | Claflin | 63
4 | Fort Hays State | 75
IUPUI | 49
2 | SW Oklahoma State | 69

National championship
4 | Fort Hays State | 57
2 | SW Oklahoma State | 53

== See also ==
- 1991 NCAA Division I women's basketball tournament
- 1991 NCAA Division II women's basketball tournament
- 1991 NCAA Division III women's basketball tournament
- 1991 NAIA men's basketball tournament
