= Eric Riley =

American basketball player (born 1970)

Personal information
- Born: June 2, 1970 (age 56) Cleveland, Ohio, U.S.
- Listed height: 7 ft 0 in (2.13 m)
- Listed weight: 245 lb (111 kg)

Career information
- High school: Saint Joseph (Cleveland, Ohio)
- College: Michigan (1989–1993)
- NBA draft: 1993: 2nd round, 33rd overall pick
- Drafted by: Dallas Mavericks
- Playing career: 1993–2004
- Position: Center
- Number: 42, 40, 54, 44

Career history
- 1993–1994: Houston Rockets
- 1994–1995: Los Angeles Clippers
- 1995–1996: Minnesota Timberwolves
- 1996–1997: Apollon Patras
- 1997–1998: Dallas Mavericks
- 1999: Boston Celtics
- 2000–2001: Indiana Legends
- 2001: Cocodrilos de Caracas
- 2001–2002: Euro Roseto
- 2002–2003: Liaoning Dinosaurs
- 2003–2004: Proteas EKA AEL

Career highlights
- NBA champion (1994); Greek League All-Star (1996 II)

Career NBA statistics
- Points: 574 (3.1 ppg)
- Rebounds: 479 (2.6 rpg)
- Stats at NBA.com
- Stats at Basketball Reference

Eric Riley (born June 2, 1970) is an American former professional basketball player who was selected by the Dallas Mavericks in the second round (33rd pick overall) of the 1993 NBA draft. Riley played for the Mavericks, Houston Rockets, Los Angeles Clippers, Minnesota Timberwolves and Boston Celtics in five NBA seasons, averaging 3.1 points per game. He was an injured reserve member of the 1993–94 Houston Rockets who won the NBA championship.

Born in Cleveland, Ohio, he played for Cleveland's St. Joseph High School and then collegiately at the University of Michigan. At Michigan, he redshirted on the 1989 NCAA national champion Wolverines team, and then was the sixth man on Michigan's 1991–92 & 1992–93 Fab Five teams that reached the 1992 & 1993 NCAA Men's Division I Basketball Championship final game.

== College career ==
In 1991, as a sophomore, Riley led the entire 1990–91 Michigan team in both rebounding and blocked shots. In fact, Riley was second in the Big Ten Conference in rebounds for the 1990–91 season. He earned honorable mention All-Big Ten recognition in 1991. On the Fab Five teams, Riley led all reserve players in points, rebounds and blocks. After being relegated to reserve status following the arrival of the Fab Five, he had the best game of his career in the Southeast Regional semifinals of the 1992 NCAA Division I men's basketball tournament.

== Professional career ==
Riley's draft rights were acquired by the Houston Rockets in a trade made prior to the 1993 NBA draft. Riley spent his rookie season on the 1993–94 Rockets, coached by fellow Michigan alumnus Rudy Tomjanovich, who won the franchise's first NBA title. Though a member of the team, Riley was put on the injured list prior to the playoffs. Riley was waived on December 12, 1994 but was soon acquired by the Los Angeles Clippers. During his playing career (1993–2004), Riley played for a total of five NBA franchises, as well as several professional teams outside the United States.

== Later work ==
In 2009 Eric Riley started a non-profit called High Rise Foundation. HRF is a non-profit charity with the mission to mentor young adults through sports programs, sports clinics and academic tutoring.
