= 1991 NCAA Division III women's basketball tournament =

- Teams: 32
- Finals site: , Saint Paul, Minnesota
- Champions: St. Thomas (MN) Tommies (1st title)
- Runner-up: Muskingum Fighting Muskies (1st title game)
- Third place: Eastern Connecticut State Warriors (1st Final Four)
- Fourth place: Washington University Bears (2nd Final Four)
- Winning coach: Ted Riverso (1st title)

The 1991 NCAA Division III women's basketball tournament was the tenth annual tournament hosted by the NCAA to determine the national champion of Division III women's collegiate basketball in the United States.

St. Thomas (MN) defeated Muskingum in the championship game, 73–55, to claim the Tommies' first Division III national title.

The championship rounds were hosted by the University of St. Thomas in Saint Paul, Minnesota.

== Format ==
There was a slight adjustment to the tournament's format in 1991, even though the field size remained fixed at 32 teams.

The bracket was reorganized from eight regional tournaments of four teams, with each regional winner advancing to the national quarterfinal round, to a new structure of four sectionals of eight teams. Under the new format, the four sectional champions advanced to the national semifinal, or Final Four, round.

== Bracket ==
- An asterisk by a team indicates the host of first and second round games
- An asterisk by a score indicates an overtime period

=== Atlantic sectional ===
Regionals; March 1–2, 1991; Campus sites
St. John Fisher*	74
Buffalo State	66
East Regional
NYU*	54
Hartwick	55*
(Pairings are reseeded after the first round)
Kean	57
Frostburg State*	61
Atlantic Regional
Capital (OH)*	74
Muskingum	76

Sectional semifinals March 8, 1991; New Concord, OH
St. John Fisher	79
Frostburg State	50
Hartwick	57
Muskingum	67

Sectional finals March 9, 1991; New Concord, OH
St. John Fisher	70
Muskingum	81

=== South sectional ===
Regionals; March 1–2, 1991; Campus sites
Washington St. Louis*	69
Augustana (IL)	62
Central Regional
Luther*	78
Wartburg	54
(Pairings are reseeded after the first round)
Maryville (TN)*	88
Centre (KY)	80
South Regional
Roanoke*	86
Marymount	66

Sectional semifinals March 8, 1991; Salem, VA
Washington St. Louis	73
Maryville (TN)	59
Luther	74
Roanoke	84

Sectional finals March 9, 1991; Salem, VA
Washington St. Louis	67
Roanoke	51

=== Northeast sectional ===
Regionals; March 1–2, 1991; Campus sites
Susquehanna*	70
Carnegie Mellon	54
Mid-Atlantic Regional
Franklin & Marshall	76
Moravian*	81
(Pairings are reseeded after the first round)
Southern Maine	60
Salem State*	57
Northeast Regional
Eastern Connecticut	62
Western Connecticut*	50

Sectional semifinals March 8, 1991; Willimantic, CT
Susquehanna	74
Southern Maine	83
Moravian	62
Eastern Connecticut	71

Sectional finals March 9, 1991; Willimantic, CT
Southern Maine	62
Eastern Connecticut	63

=== West sectional ===
Regionals; March 1–2, 1991; Campus sites
Wisconsin–Stevens Point	62
Wisconsin–Oshkosh*	67
Great Lakes Regional
Calvin	50
Adrian*	57
(Pairings are reseeded after the first round)
Saint Benedict	62
St. Thomas (MN)*	76
West Regional
Gustavus Adolphus	62
Concordia Moorhead*	75

Sectional semifinals March 8, 1991; St. Paul, MN
Wisconsin–Oshkosh	63
St. Thomas (MN)	87
Adrian	75
Concordia Moorhead	100

Sectional finals March 9, 1991; St. Paul, MN
St. Thomas (MN)	76
Concordia Moorhead	62

=== Final Four ===
Final Four
Muskingum	85
Washington St. Louis	60
Eastern Connecticut	55
St. Thomas (MN)	91

National championship
Muskingum	55
St. Thomas (MN)	73
Third place
Washington St. Louis	74
Eastern Connecticut	83

== All-tournament team ==
- Tonja Englund, St. Thomas (MN)
- Laurie Trow, St. Thomas (MN)
- Michelle Snow, Muskingum
- Kate Titus, Muskingum
- Bernice Laferriere, Eastern Connecticut State

== See also ==
- 1991 NCAA Division I women's basketball tournament
- 1991 NCAA Division II women's basketball tournament
- 1991 NCAA Division III men's basketball tournament
- 1991 NAIA women's basketball tournament
