= Middleton, Columbiana County, Ohio =

Unincorporated community in Ohio, U.S.

Coordinates: 40°50′36″N 80°39′04″W

Middleton is an unincorporated community in Columbiana County, in the U.S. state of Ohio.

== History ==
Middleton was among the first settlements made in Fairfield Township. A variant name of Middleton was Mosk. The Mosk post office was established in 1882, and remained in operation until 1902.
