= 1991 NCAA Division II women's basketball tournament =

American collegiate basketball tournament

- Teams: 32
- Finals site: , Cape Girardeau, Missouri
- Champions: North Dakota State Bison (1st title)
- Runner-up: Southeast Missouri State Otahkians (1st title game)
- Third place: Bentley Falcons (3rd Final Four)
- Fourth place: Norfolk State Spartans (1st Final Four)
- Winning coach: Amy Ruley, NDSU (1st title)
- MOP: Nadine Schmidt (North Dakota State)

The 1991 NCAA Division II women's basketball tournament was the tenth annual tournament hosted by the NCAA to determine the national champion of Division II women's collegiate basketball in the United States.

North Dakota State defeated Southeast Missouri State in the championship game, 81–74, claiming the Bison's first NCAA Division II national title.

The championship rounds were contested at the Show Me Center at Southeast Missouri State University in Cape Girardeau, Missouri.

== Regionals ==
=== East - Johnstown, Pennsylvania ===
Location: Sports Center Host: University of Pittsburgh at Johnstown

Regional semifinals Round of 32; March 8
Lock Haven	75
Pitt Johnstown	70
Clarion	80
Bloomsburg	76

Regional final Sweet 16; March 9
Lock Haven	70
Clarion	77

=== South Atlantic - Norfolk, Virginia ===
Location: Joseph G. Echols Memorial Hall Host: Norfolk State University

Regional semifinals Round of 32; March 8
Norfolk State	88
Pace	47
UNC Greensboro	72
Hampton	63

Regional final Sweet 16; March 9
Norfolk State	72
UNC Greensboro	62

=== West - Turlock, California ===
Location: Warrior Gym Host: California State University, Stanislaus

Regional semifinals Round of 32; March 8
Cal Poly Pomona	67
Barry	64
UC Davis	64
Stanislaus State	45

Regional final Sweet 16; March 9
Cal Poly Pomona	58
UC Davis	56

=== South Central - Cape Girardeau, Missouri ===
Location: Show Me Center Host: Southeast Missouri State University

Regional semifinals Round of 32; March 8
West Texas State	75
Washburn	51
Southeast Missouri State	80
Central Missouri State	65

Regional final Sweet 16; March 9
West Texas State	70
Southeast Missouri State	71

=== North Central - Grand Forks, North Dakota ===
Location: Hyslop Sports Center Host: University of North Dakota

Regional semifinals Round of 32; March 8
North Dakota State	90
Augustana (SD)	89
North Dakota	94
Florida Atlantic	78

Regional final Sweet 16; March 9
North Dakota State	81
North Dakota	59

=== Great Lakes - Highland Heights, Kentucky ===
Location: Regents Hall Host: Northern Kentucky University

Regional semifinals Round of 32; March 8
Bellarmine	84
Michigan Tech	66
Northern Michigan	67
Northern Kentucky	63

Regional final Sweet 16; March 9
Bellarmine	78
Northern Michigan	70

=== South - Jacksonville, Alabama ===
Location: Pete Mathews Coliseum Host: Jacksonville State University

Regional semifinals Round of 32; March 8
Delta State	107
Alabama A&M	90
Jacksonville State	81
North Alabama	80

Regional final Sweet 16; March 9
Delta State	67
Jacksonville State	71

=== New England - Waltham, Massachusetts ===
Location: Dana Center Host: Bentley College

Regional semifinals Round of 32; March 8
Saint Anselm	82
Lowell	65
Bentley	79
Stonehill	29

Regional final Sweet 16; March 9
Saint Anselm	73
Bentley	86

== National Finals - Cape Girardeau, Missouri ==
Final Four Location: Show Me Center Host: Southeast Missouri State University

National quarterfinals Elite Eight; March 16
Clarion	69
Norfolk State	91
Norfolk, Virginia; Cape Girardeau, Missouri
Cal Poly Pomona	52
Southeast Missouri State	82
North Dakota State	87
Bellarmine	64
Louisville, Kentucky; Waltham, Mass.
Jacksonville State	92
Bentley	97

National semifinals Final Four; March 22
Norfolk State	52
Southeast Missouri State	85
North Dakota State	83
Bentley	76

National championship March 23
Southeast Missouri State	74
North Dakota State	81
Third place
Norfolk State	58
Bentley	60

== All-tournament team ==
- Nadine Schmidt, North Dakota State
- Jill DeVries, North Dakota State
- Jerri Wiley, Southeast Missouri State
- Sarita Wesley, Southeast Missouri State
- Kim Penwell, Bentley

== See also ==
- NCAA Women's Division II Basketball Championship
- 1991 NCAA Division I women's basketball tournament
- 1991 NCAA Division III women's basketball tournament
- 1991 NCAA Division II men's basketball tournament
