= List of Louisiana Tech Bulldogs basketball seasons =

The Louisiana Tech Bulldogs college basketball team competes in the National Collegiate Athletic Association's (NCAA) Division I, representing Louisiana Tech University in Conference USA. Louisiana Tech has played its home games at the Thomas Assembly Center in Ruston, Louisiana since its opening in 1982.

== Seasons ==
Official record as of April 1, 2026.

Conference champion^{†}	Conference tournament champions^{‡}	Postseason bid^{^}	Shared standing T

Season	Team	Head coach	Conference	Season results							Tournament results		Final polls	
Season	Team	Head coach	Conference	Overall			Conference				Conference	Postseason	AP	Coaches'
Season	Team	Head coach	Conference	Wins	Losses	Pct.	Wins	Losses	Pct.	Standing	Conference	Postseason	AP	Coaches'
1909–10	Louisiana Tech	Percy S. Prince	LSIAA	2	2	.500	2	0	1.000	1st	–	—	—	—
1910–11	Louisiana Tech	Percy S. Prince	–	3	2	.600	–	—	—	—	—	—	—	—
Louisiana Tech did not field a men's basketball team from 1911–1925.
1925–26	Louisiana Tech	R. C. Kenney	SIAA	7	7	.500	5	3	.625	–	–	—	—	—
1926–27	Louisiana Tech	Robert S. Wynn	SIAA	14	8	.636	8	2	.800	1st	–	—	—	—
1927–28	Louisiana Tech	Robert S. Wynn	SIAA	15	10	.600	6	2	.750	1st	–	—	—	—
1928–29	Louisiana Tech	Robert S. Wynn	SIAA	11	14	.440			–	–	–	—	—	—
1929–30	Louisiana Tech	Robert S. Wynn	SIAA	13	12	.520			–	–	–	—	—	—
1930–31	Louisiana Tech	Robert S. Wynn	SIAA	7	12	.368			–	–	–	—	—	—
1931–32	Louisiana Tech	Hal Lee	SIAA	4	9	.308			–	–	–	—	—	—
1932–33	Louisiana Tech	Hal Lee	SIAA	8	4	.667			–	–	–	—	—	—
1933–34	Louisiana Tech	Hal Lee	SIAA	12	6	.667	4	3	.571	1st	–	—	—	—
1934–35	Louisiana Tech	Eddie McLane	SIAA	14	7	.667			–	–	–	—	—	—
1935–36	Louisiana Tech	Eddie McLane	SIAA	12	5	.706			–	–	–	—	—	—
1936–37	Louisiana Tech	Herb Duggins	SIAA	7	12	.368			–	–	–	—	—	—
1937–38	Louisiana Tech	Herb Duggins	SIAA	5	9	.357			–	–	–	—	—	—
1938–39	Louisiana Tech	Herb Duggins	SIAA	10	8	.556			–	–	–	—	—	—
1939–40	Louisiana Tech	Herb Duggins	Louisiana Intercollegiate	5	17	.227	4	12	.250	–	–	—	—	—
1940–41	Louisiana Tech	Cecil Crowley	Louisiana Intercollegiate	7	10	.412	7	7	.500	–	–	—	—	—
1941–42	Louisiana Tech	Cecil Crowley	Louisiana Intercollegiate	13	8	.619	7	1	.875	1st	–	NAIB first round	—	—
Louisiana Tech did not field a men's basketball team from 1942–1944.
1944–45	Louisiana Tech	Joe Aillet	Louisiana Intercollegiate	5	12	.294					–	—	—	—
1945–46	Louisiana Tech	Cecil Crowley	Louisiana Intercollegiate	16	8	.667	9	1	.900	1st	–	NAIB first round	—	—
1946–47	Louisiana Tech	Cecil Crowley	Louisiana Intercollegiate	12	6	.667	6	2	.750	T–1st	–	—	—	—
1947–48	Louisiana Tech	Cecil Crowley	Louisiana Intercollegiate	14	10	.583	7	1	.875	T–1st	–	—	—	—
1948–49	Louisiana Tech	Cecil Crowley	Gulf States	11	11	.500	8	8	.500	–	–	—	—	—
1949–50	Louisiana Tech	Cecil Crowley	Gulf States	11	9	.550	8	8	.500	–	–	—	—	—
1950–51	Louisiana Tech	Cecil Crowley	Gulf States	11	10	.524	6	10	.375	–	–	—	—	—
1951–52	Louisiana Tech	Cecil Crowley	Gulf States	13	11	.542	7	9	.438	–	–	—	—	—
1952–53	Louisiana Tech	Cecil Crowley	Gulf States	17	10	.630	9	3	.750	1st	–	NAIA first round	—	—
1953–54	Louisiana Tech	Cecil Crowley	Gulf States	11	14	.440	3	9	.250	–	–	—	—	—
1954–55	Louisiana Tech	Cecil Crowley	Gulf States	20	10	.667	9	3	.750	T–1st	–	NAIA second round	—	—
1955–56	Louisiana Tech	Cecil Crowley	Gulf States	11	14	.440	7	5	.583	–	–	—	—	—
1956–57	Louisiana Tech	Cecil Crowley	Gulf States	14	11	.560	6	4	.600	–	–	—	—	—
1957–58	Louisiana Tech	Cecil Crowley	Gulf States	15	10	.600	4	6	.400	–	–	—	—	—
1958–59	Louisiana Tech	Cecil Crowley	Gulf States	21	4	.840	9	1	.900	1st	–	—	—	—
1959–60	Louisiana Tech	Cecil Crowley	Gulf States	17	9	.654	6	4	.600	–	–	—	—	—
1960–61	Louisiana Tech	Cecil Crowley	Gulf States	7	16	.304	3	7	.300	–	–	—	—	—
1961–62	Louisiana Tech	Cecil Crowley	Gulf States	6	17	.261	3	7	.300	–	–	—	—	—
1962–63	Louisiana Tech	Cecil Crowley	Gulf States	10	13	.435	4	6	.400	–	–	—	—	—
1963–64	Louisiana Tech	Cecil Crowley	Gulf States	12	10	.545	7	3	.700	T–1st	–	—	—	—
1964–65	Louisiana Tech	Scotty Robertson	Gulf States	10	11	.476	6	4	.600	–	–	—	—	—
1965–66	Louisiana Tech	Scotty Robertson	Gulf States	14	11	.560	7	5	.583	–	–	—	—	—
1966–67	Louisiana Tech	Scotty Robertson	Gulf States	20	8	.714	11	1	.917	T–1st	–	NCAA Regional Runner-up	—	—
1967–68	Louisiana Tech	Scotty Robertson	Gulf States	16	9	.640	6	6	.500	–	–	—	—	—
1968–69	Louisiana Tech	Scotty Robertson	Gulf States	12	13	.480	7	5	.583	–	–	—	—	—
1969–70	Louisiana Tech	Scotty Robertson	Gulf States	17	5	.773	9	3	.750	T–1st	–	—	—	—
1970–71	Louisiana Tech	Scotty Robertson	Gulf States	23	5	.821	11	1	.917	1st	–	NCAA Regional Third Place	—	—
1971–72	Louisiana Tech	Scotty Robertson	Southland	25	1	.962	8	0	1.000	1st	–	—	—	—
1972–73	Louisiana Tech	Scotty Robertson	Southland	20	6	.769	10	2	.833	T–1st	–	—	—	—
1973–74	Louisiana Tech	Scotty Robertson	Southland	8	13	.381	0	0	–	–	–	—	—	—
1974–75	Louisiana Tech	Emmett Hendricks	Southland	12	13	.480	5	3	.625	2nd	—	—	—	—
1975–76	Louisiana Tech	Emmett Hendricks	Southland	15	11	.577	9	1	.900	1st	—	—	—	—
1976–77	Louisiana Tech	Emmett Hendricks	Southland	13	13	.500	4	6	.400	T–4th	—	—	—	—
1977–78	Louisiana Tech	J. D. Barnett	Southland	6	21	.222	2	8	.200	T–5th	—	—	—	—
1978–79	Louisiana Tech	J. D. Barnett	Southland	17	8	.680	6	4	.600	T–2nd	—	—	—	—
1979–80	Louisiana Tech	Andy Russo	Southland	17	10	.630	4	6	.400	5th	—	—	—	—
1980–81	Louisiana Tech	Andy Russo	Southland	20	10	.667	7	3	.700	T–2nd	Finals	—	—	—
1981–82	Louisiana Tech	Andy Russo	Southland	11	16	.407	2	8	.200	6th	Quarterfinals	—	—	—
1982–83	Louisiana Tech	Andy Russo	Southland	19	9	.679	8	4	.667	2nd	Quarterfinals	—	—	—
1983–84	Louisiana Tech	Andy Russo	Southland	26	7	.788	8	4	.667	3rd	Champions	NCAA second round	—	—
1984–85	Louisiana Tech	Andy Russo	Southland	29	3	.906	11	1	.917	1st	Champions	NCAA Sweet Sixteen	8	8
1985–86	Louisiana Tech	Tommy Joe Eagles	Southland	20	14	.588	6	6	.500	T–4th	semifinals	NIT Third Place	—	—
1986–87	Louisiana Tech	Tommy Joe Eagles	Southland	22	8	.733	9	1	.900	1st	Champions	NCAA first round	—	—
1987–88	Louisiana Tech	Tommy Joe Eagles	American South	22	9	.710	7	3	.700	T–1st	Champions	NIT second round	—	—
1988–89	Louisiana Tech	Tommy Joe Eagles	American South	23	9	.719	6	4	.600	T–2nd	Champions	NCAA second round	—	—
1989–90	Louisiana Tech	Jerry Loyd	American South	20	8	.714	8	2	.800	T–1st	semifinals	NIT first round	—	—
1990–91	Louisiana Tech	Jerry Loyd	American South	21	10	.677	8	4	.667	3rd	Champions	NCAA first round	—	—
1991–92	Louisiana Tech	Jerry Loyd	Sun Belt	22	9	.710	13	3	.813	1st	Finals	NIT first round	—	—
1992–93	Louisiana Tech	Jerry Loyd	Sun Belt	7	21	.250	3	15	.167	T–8th	Quarterfinals	—	—	—
1993–94	Louisiana Tech	Jerry Loyd	Sun Belt	2	25	.074	0	18	.000	10th	first round	—	—	—
1994–95	Louisiana Tech	Jim Wooldridge	Sun Belt	14	13	.519	9	9	.500	T–5th	Quarterfinals	—	—	—
1995–96	Louisiana Tech	Jim Wooldridge	Sun Belt	11	17	.393	6	12	.333	T–9th	Quarterfinals	—	—	—
1996–97	Louisiana Tech	Jim Wooldridge	Sun Belt	15	14	.517	10	8	.556	T–4th	Finals	—	—	—
1997–98	Louisiana Tech	Jim Wooldridge	Sun Belt	12	15	.444	9	9	.500	T–5th	Quarterfinals	—	—	—
1998–99	Louisiana Tech	Keith Richard	Sun Belt	19	9	.679	10	4	.714	1st	semifinals	—	—	—
1999–00	Louisiana Tech	Keith Richard	Sun Belt	21	8	.724	12	4	.750	3rd	semifinals	—	—	—
2000–01	Louisiana Tech	Keith Richard	Sun Belt	17	12	.586	10	6	.625	T–2nd (East)	Quarterfinals	—	—	—
2001–02	Louisiana Tech	Keith Richard	WAC	22	10	.688	14	4	.778	3rd	Quarterfinals	NIT second round	—	—
2002–03	Louisiana Tech	Keith Richard	WAC	12	15	.444	9	9	.500	T–6th	Quarterfinals	—	—	—
2003–04	Louisiana Tech	Keith Richard	WAC	15	15	.500	8	10	.444	7th	Quarterfinals	—	—	—
2004–05	Louisiana Tech	Keith Richard	WAC	14	15	.483	9	9	.500	T–4th	Quarterfinals	—	—	—
2005–06	Louisiana Tech	Keith Richard	WAC	20	13	.606	11	5	.688	T–2nd	semifinals	NIT first round	—	—
2006–07	Louisiana Tech	Keith Richard	WAC	10	20	.333	7	9	.438	7th	Quarterfinals	—	—	—
2007–08	Louisiana Tech	Kerry Rupp	WAC	6	24	.200	3	13	.188	9th	first round	—	—	—
2008–09	Louisiana Tech	Kerry Rupp	WAC	15	18	.455	6	10	.375	T–6th	semifinals	—	—	—
2009–10	Louisiana Tech	Kerry Rupp	WAC	24	11	.686	9	7	.563	4th	semifinals	CIT second round	—	—
2010–11	Louisiana Tech	Kerry Rupp	WAC	12	20	.375	2	14	.125	9th	Did not qualify	—	—	—
2011–12	Louisiana Tech	Michael White	WAC	18	16	.529	6	8	.429	T–5th	Finals	—	—	—
2012–13	Louisiana Tech	Michael White	WAC	27	7	.794	16	2	.889	T–1st	Quarterfinals	NIT second round	—	—
2013–14	Louisiana Tech	Michael White	C-USA	29	8	.784	13	3	.813	T–1st	Finals	NIT Quarterfinals	—	—
2014–15	Louisiana Tech	Michael White	C-USA	27	9	.750	15	3	.833	1st	semifinals	NIT Quarterfinals	—	—
2015–16	Louisiana Tech	Eric Konkol	C-USA	23	10	.697	12	6	.667	T–3rd	Quarterfinals	Vegas 16 Quarterfinals	—	—
2016–17	Louisiana Tech	Eric Konkol	C-USA	23	10	.697	14	4	.778	2nd	semifinals	—	—	—
2017–18	Louisiana Tech	Eric Konkol	C-USA	17	16	.515	7	11	.389	T–9th	Quarterfinals	—	—	—
2018–19	Louisiana Tech	Eric Konkol	C-USA	20	13	.606	9	9	.500	8th	Quarterfinals	—	—	—
2019–20	Louisiana Tech	Eric Konkol	C-USA	22	8	.733	13	5	.722	T–2nd	Canceled	Canceled due to COVID-19 pandemic	—	—
2020–21	Louisiana Tech	Eric Konkol	C-USA	24	8	.750	12	4	.750	1st (West)	semifinals	NIT Third Place	—	—
2021–22	Louisiana Tech	Eric Konkol	C-USA	24	10	.706	12	6	.667	3rd (West)	Finals	—	—	—
2022–23	Louisiana Tech	Talvin Hester	C-USA	15	18	.455	7	13	.350	10th	Quarterfinals	—	—	—
2023–24	Louisiana Tech	Talvin Hester	C-USA	22	10	.688	12	4	.750	2nd	Quarterfinals	—	—	—
2024–25	Louisiana Tech	Talvin Hester	C-USA	20	12	.625	9	9	.500	6th	Quarterfinals	—	—	—
2025–26	Louisiana Tech	Talvin Hester	C-USA	20	14	.588	11	9	.550	T–3rd	Finals	—	—	—
