= Tim Floyd =

American basketball player and coach

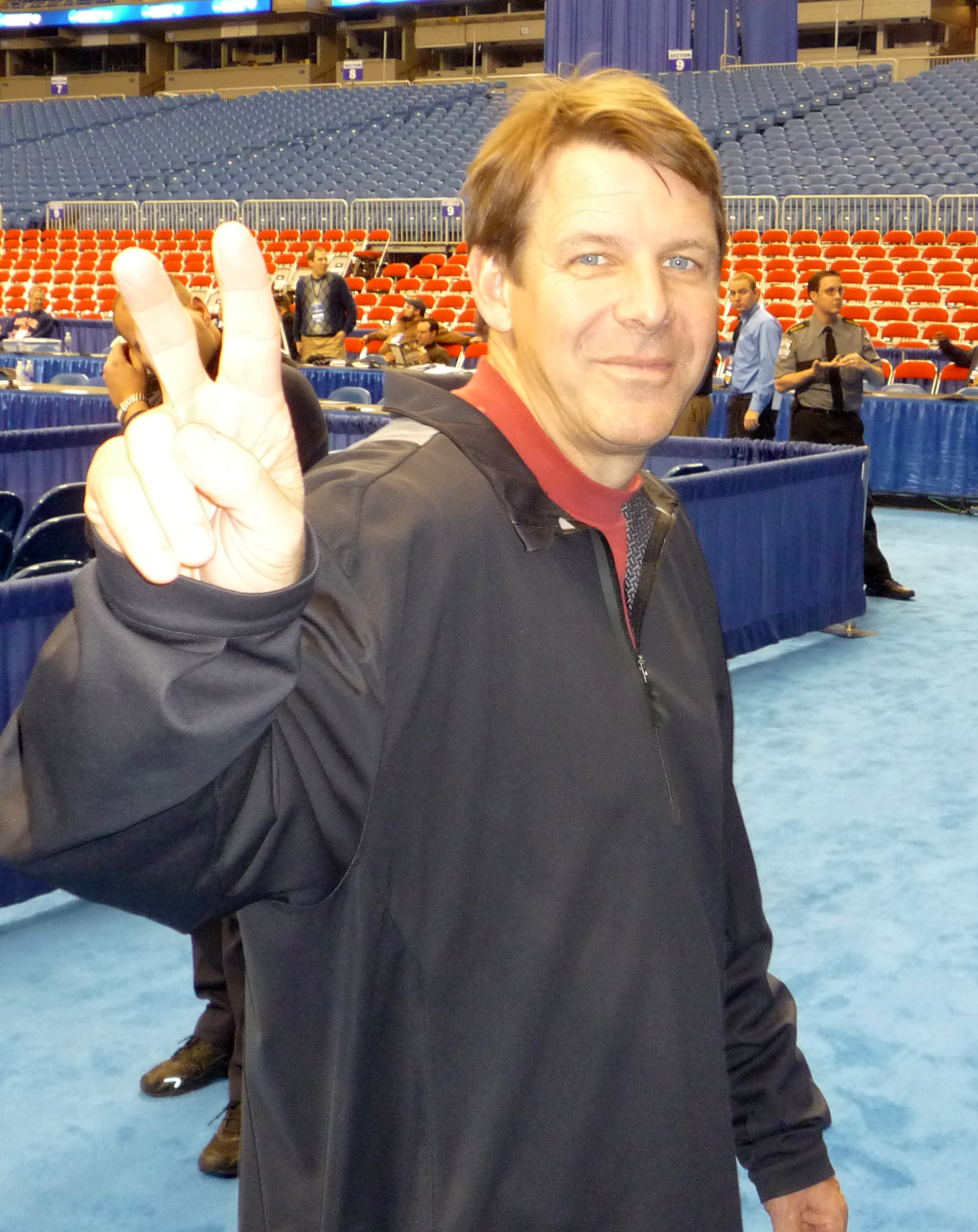
- Floyd during a practice before the 2009 NCAA tournament

Biographical details
- Born: February 25, 1954 (age 72); Hattiesburg, Mississippi, U.S.

Playing career
- ?: Southern Miss
- 1975–1976: Louisiana Tech

Coaching career (HC unless noted)
- 1976–1977: Louisiana Tech (assistant)
- 1977–1986: UTEP (assistant)
- 1986–1988: Idaho
- 1988–1994: New Orleans
- 1994–1998: Iowa State
- 1998–2001: Chicago Bulls
- 2003–2004: New Orleans Hornets
- 2005–2009: USC
- 2010–2017: UTEP

Head coaching record
- Overall: 444–248 (college); 90–231 (NBA)

Accomplishments and honors

Championships
- 3 ASC regular season (1989–1991); ASC tournament (1990); Sun Belt regular season (1993); Big Eight tournament (1996); Pac-10 tournament (2009)

Awards
- ASC Coach of the Year (1989); Sun Belt Coach of the Year (1993); Big Eight Coach of the Year (1996)

Timothy Fitzpatrick Floyd (born February 25, 1954) is a former American college basketball coach, most recently the head coach at the University of Texas at El Paso (UTEP). He was formerly the head coach of several teams in the NCAA and the NBA. Floyd is also known as the coach of the Chicago Bulls for four seasons. He announced his retirement from coaching after the UTEP game on November 27, 2017.

== Personal life ==
Born in Hattiesburg, Mississippi, Floyd is a 1977 graduate of Louisiana Tech University where he earned a Bachelor of Science degree in health and physical education. He originally was a walk-on player at the University of Southern Mississippi in Hattiesburg, but he transferred to Louisiana Tech in Ruston and was a scholarship player there. His father, who was also a coach, died when Floyd was 18.

Floyd and wife Beverly have one daughter, Shannon. Shannon married Chicago Bears player Hunter Hillenmeyer in 2008.

In November 2009, a video surfaced on YouTube depicting Floyd breaking up a fight in the food court of a casino in Palm Desert, California. Floyd confirmed the video's accuracy, telling ESPN.com that "I was leaving and then this thing happened in the food court", referring to the fight.

== Coaching career ==
=== University of Texas at El Paso ===
Floyd's first coaching job was as an assistant at UTEP under Hall of Famer Don Haskins from 1977 to 1986. While Floyd was at UTEP, the Miners went to three straight NCAA Tournaments (from 1984 to 1986). They also went to the NIT three times (1980, 1981, 1983) and won four Western Athletic Conference championships in those years.

=== University of Idaho ===
Floyd's first assignment as a head coach came at the University of Idaho in Moscow; hired in March 1986, he succeeded Bill Trumbo, who finished last in the Big Sky conference in each of his three seasons. Floyd coached the Vandals for two years; in his first season, the Vandals posted their first winning record since alumnus Don Monson left for Oregon after the 20–9 1983 season. The next season, they were the regular season runner-up, their best result since 1982. (After Floyd's 1988 departure, assistant Kermit Davis was promoted to head coach and Idaho won the conference title in 1989 and 1990.)

=== University of New Orleans ===
At the University of New Orleans, Floyd tallied a 127–58 (.686) mark in six seasons as head coach. During his tenure, the Privateers advanced to postseason play five times, including two NCAA Tournament appearances in 1991 and 1993 and the NIT three times. At UNO, Floyd averaged 21 wins a season; he is one of only four Division I coaches who have won four conference championships in the first five years at their school. In his final season at New Orleans in 1994, the team finished 20–10. Floyd reached the 20-win plateau for the sixth time in eight seasons, and UNO made its seventh postseason appearance in eight years.

=== Iowa State University ===
Floyd was hired at Iowa State University in May 1994 as the 15th basketball coach in ISU history. In his four years at ISU, Floyd posted an 81–49 (.623) record. He is one of two coaches in Iowa State history to post three consecutive 20-win seasons along with his former player and former ISU basketball coach Fred Hoiberg. He also led the team to three straight appearances in the NCAA Tournament and three straight first-round victories.

In his first season with the Cyclones, Floyd guided the team to a then-school-record 23 victories and the second round of the NCAA tournament. During that season, the Cyclones were ranked in the AP Top 25 poll for 11 consecutive weeks, peaking at number eleven. Four of the eleven ISU losses were to 1995 NCAA Final Four teams. The Cyclones returned to the Big Eight Conference tournament championship for the first time since 1986. In addition, during the 1995 season, Fred Hoiberg became the first Cyclone to earn All-American honors since Jeff Grayer in 1988.

Picked in preseason polls to finish last in the Big Eight, the 1995–96 Cyclones finished second in the league with a 9–5 mark and won the Big Eight Conference tournament with a win over the Kansas Jayhawks, then ranked the number five team in the nation. The Cyclones received the highest NCAA Tournament seed in school history up to that time. As the number five seed, the Cyclones defeated the California Bears but lost to the Utah Utes, then coached by Rick Majerus (who, in 2004, accepted and immediately resigned from the USC head coaching job that later went to Floyd). Iowa State's 24 victories that season was a school record. For his coaching efforts, Floyd was named Big Eight Coach of the Year and runner-up to Gene Keady of Purdue University for AP National Coach of the Year.

In the 1996–1997 season, with high expectations and a national ranking as high as number four, Floyd and the Cyclones posted a 22–9 mark and advanced to their first NCAA Sweet Sixteen appearance in 11 years. In the NCAA Tournament, the sixth-seeded Cyclones defeated the Illinois State Redbirds in the first round and the Cincinnati Bearcats before losing to the UCLA Bruins in overtime in a game they led by double digits most of the game.

Floyd was also responsible for landing would-be recruits, including Nick Collison and Kirk Hinrich, who would later withdraw their verbal commitments upon Floyd's departure from Iowa State.

While at Iowa State, Floyd coached future pros Dedric Willoughby, Fred Hoiberg, Kelvin Cato, Marcus Fizer and Paul Shirley.

=== Chicago Bulls ===
In 1998, Floyd was hired as the head coach of the NBA Chicago Bulls on July 23, replacing Phil Jackson. That offseason, the players of the Bulls championship teams retired or left, leaving the equivalent of an expansion team. During the lockout season of 1998–1999, the Bulls went 13–37 (.260), and were 17–65 (.207) the next season. The team continued to lose, posting a 15–67 (.183) record in the 2000–01 season. His fourth year as coach was marred by fights with players and management; after a 4–21 start, Floyd resigned on December 24, 2001.

In his four seasons with the Bulls, Floyd posted a record of 49–190 (.205). The team did not make the NBA playoffs in any of those seasons. Known as a favorite of Jerry Krause by the Chicago media, Floyd proclaimed at a July 1998 press conference introducing him to reporters, "Don't call me Jerry's boy."

=== New Orleans Hornets ===
As head coach of the New Orleans Hornets in 2003–04, Floyd posted a 41–41 record, despite the mid-season loss of Hornets star Jamal Mashburn. The Hornets lost in the first round of the playoffs, taking the Miami Heat the full seven games. Ownership was dissatisfied and dismissed Floyd after just one season.

Floyd ended his NBA career with a 93–235 (.284) record, including the playoffs, admitting in interviews that, as an NBA coach, "I wasn't very good at it". It was announced on November 12, 2009, that Floyd would be rejoining the Hornets as a top assistant to head coach and General Manager Jeff Bower.

=== University of Southern California ===
On January 14, 2005, Floyd was hired as head coach of the USC Trojans, he succeeded interim coach Jim Saia, who filled in after the school fired Henry Bibby. USC had originally hired Rick Majerus on December 15, 2004, however he unexpectedly resigned five days later. Floyd was the Trojans' immediate next choice.

Floyd's initial season may be regarded as a success. The 2005–06 Trojans finished the regular season with a 17–12 (8–10) record and sixth place in the Pac-10, including three conference losses by a combined nine points. Floyd was the subject of heightened media attention in October 2006, when 14-year-old high school freshman Dwayne Polee Jr., son of former NBA player Dwayne Polee, verbally accepted a scholarship offer from Floyd. Polee Jr. had yet to play in a high school basketball game.

For the 2006–2007 season, Floyd led the Trojans to a 25–12 (13–8) record (most wins in school history) and third place in the Pac-10. He also led this team to finals of the Pacific Life Pac-10 Tournament, where they lost to Oregon. Floyd took the Trojans to the 2007 NCAA tournament's Sweet 16, only the second USC team to do so since 1979. However, USC lost to number one seeded UNC on March 23, 2007.

In the 2008 NCAA Tournament, the #6 seeded Trojans fell 80–67 to the #11 seed Kansas State Wildcats in the first round.

Floyd's Trojans won the 2009 Pac-10 Tournament by defeating Arizona State, then made it to the second round of the 2009 NCAA tournament, losing to eventual runner-up Michigan State. This marked the first time the Trojans had made a third consecutive NCAA tournament. After USC's exit from the tournament, Floyd was offered the vacant coaching position at Arizona but turned it down.

==== USC scandal and resignation ====
The off-season immediately following the 2009 tournament proved to be tumultuous for Floyd and the USC program: Key starters DeMar DeRozan, Taj Gibson and Daniel Hackett all declared for the NBA draft on the same day. Floyd was accused of providing improper benefits by handing cash to Los Angeles event promoter Rodney Guillory, one of the handlers for O. J. Mayo, to influence the then-high school star to choose USC, resulting in an NCAA investigation. The NCAA's 2010 infractions report for USC concluded that Floyd and other USC staffers knew about "two separate NCAA violations, one involving [Mayo] and one where [Guillory] was found to be a runner for an agent" but failed to take due diligence in Mayo's recruitment, thus a lack of institutional control on their part.

Due to the NCAA investigation and academic issues, several key recruits decommitted or chose different universities. After Marcus Johnson, who played only 16 games for USC, averaging 3.6 points, opted to turn professional, Floyd lamented to a gathering of boosters: "Kansas has two players who would have been NBA lottery picks, Cole Aldrich and Sherron Collins, and they are returning to school. Good for them. Our guys get an offer from Islamabad and they're gone."

Claiming to have lost enthusiasm for his job, Floyd resigned as the head coach of USC on June 9, 2009. Floyd first notified a paper in his home state of Mississippi; his resignation was accepted by USC, which was faced with looking for a replacement late in the off-season. Following an internal investigation, USC vacated its 21 wins from the 2007–08 season and withdrew from postseason consideration (including the Pac-10 tournament) for the 2009–10 season.

=== Return to University of Texas at El Paso ===
On March 30, 2010, UTEP announced the hiring of Floyd. Floyd replaced Tony Barbee who left to take a head coach job at Auburn. Following a loss to Lamar on November 27, 2017, that saw the Miners drop to 1–5 on the season, Floyd announced that he was retiring effective immediately. The school had previously announced a new athletic director, Jim Senter, a week prior, but Floyd said that had nothing to do with his decision. Assistant Phil Johnson was named interim head coach of the Miners the next day. Floyd led the Miners to three 20-win seasons, but no NCAA Tournament appearances.

== Controversies ==
=== O. J. Mayo ===
"Tim Floyd, who brought respectability on the court and controversy off it to the Southern California basketball program, resigned Tuesday. Floyd stepped down a month after a published report that he gave $1,000 in cash to the man who acted as a go-between when star player O.J Mayo decided to attend USC and play his freshman season at the school."

=== USC's Andy Enfield ===
In 2013, a feud developed between Floyd and USC coach Andy Enfield. The dispute started over a top-flight prospect reneging on his letter-of-intent to UTEP, followed by disparaging comments Enfield made about Floyd and El Paso in a magazine article. The two had "heated words" at a November 2013 reception in the Bahamas.

== Head coaching record ==
=== College ===
Record table
Season	Team	Overall	Conference	Standing	Postseason
Idaho Vandals (Big Sky Conference) (1986–1988)
1986–87	Idaho	16–14	6–10	6th	
1987–88	Idaho	19–11	11–6	2nd	
Idaho:		35–25 (.583)	17–16 (.515)		
New Orleans Privateers (American South Conference) (1988–1991)
1988–89	New Orleans	19–11	7–3	1st	NIT first round
1989–90	New Orleans	21–11	8–2	T–1st	NIT quarterfinal
1990–91	New Orleans	23–8	9–3	T–1st	NCAA Division I first round
New Orleans Privateers (Sun Belt Conference) (1991–1994)
1991–92	New Orleans	17–15	8–8	7th	
1992–93	New Orleans	26–4	18–0	1st	NCAA Division I first round
1993–94	New Orleans	20–10	12–6	3rd	NIT second round
New Orleans:		126–59 (.681)	62–22 (.738)		
Iowa State Cyclones (Big Eight Conference) (1994–1996)
1994–95	Iowa State	23–11	6–8	5th	NCAA Division I second round
1995–96	Iowa State	24–9	9–5	2nd	NCAA Division I second round
Iowa State Cyclones (Big 12 Conference) (1996–1998)
1996–97	Iowa State	22–9	10–6	3rd	NCAA Division I Sweet 16
1997–98	Iowa State	12–18	5–11	11th	
Iowa State:		81–47 (.633)	30–30 (.500)		
USC Trojans (Pacific-10 Conference) (2005–2009)
2005–06	USC	17–12	8–10	6th	
2006–07	USC	25–12	11–7	T–3rd	NCAA Division I Sweet 16
2007–08	USC	21–12*	11–7*	T–3rd	NCAA Division I first round*
2008–09	USC	22–13	9–9	T–5th	NCAA Division I second round
USC:		85–50** (.630)	38–33** (.535)		
UTEP Miners (Conference USA) (2010–2017)
2010–11	UTEP	25–10	11–5	T–2nd	NIT first round
2011–12	UTEP	15–17	7–9	8th	
2012–13	UTEP	18–14	10–6	3rd	
2013–14	UTEP	23–11	12–4	5th	CBI first round
2014–15	UTEP	22–11	13–5	T–2nd	NIT first round
2015–16	UTEP	19–14	10–8	6th	
2016–17	UTEP	15–17	12–6	T–3rd	
2017–18	UTEP	1–5	0–0		
UTEP:		138–99 (.582)	75–41 (.647)		
Total:		444–282** (.612)			
National champion Postseason invitational champion Conference regular season champion Conference regular season and conference tournament champion Division regular season champion Division regular season and conference tournament champion Conference tournament champion

* USC vacated all 21 of its wins for 2007–08 after O. J. Mayo was ruled ineligible. Official record is 0–12 (0–7 Pac–10). ** Record does not include vacated wins at USC.

=== NBA ===
Legend
Regular season	G	Games coached	W	Games won	L	Games lost	W–L %	Win–loss %
Playoffs	PG	Playoff games	PW	Playoff wins	PL	Playoff losses	PW–L %	Playoff win–loss %

Team	Year	G	W	L	W–L%	Finish	PG	PW	PL	PW–L%	Result
Chicago	1998–99	50	13	37	.260	8th in Central	—	—	—	—	Missed Playoffs
Chicago	1999–2000	82	17	65	.207	8th in Central	—	—	—	—	Missed Playoffs
Chicago	2000–01	82	15	67	.183	8th in Central	—	—	—	—	Missed Playoffs
Chicago	2001–02	25	4	21	.160	(resigned)	—	—	—	—	—
New Orleans	2003–04	82	41	41	.500	3rd in Central	7	3	4	.429	Lost in first round
Career		321	90	231	.280		7	3	4	.429	
