= American South Conference women's basketball tournament =

American South Conference women's basketball tournament (defunct)
- Conference basketball championship
- Sport: College basketball
- Conference: American South Conference
- Format: Single-elimination tournament
- Played: 1988–1991
- Current champion: Louisiana Tech
- Most championships: Louisiana Tech (4)

Host stadiums
- Thomas Assembly Center (1988-1991)

Host locations
- Ruston, Louisiana (1988-1991)

The American South Conference women's basketball tournament was the conference championship tournament in women's basketball for the American South Conference (ASC). The tournament was held annually between 1988 and 1991, after which most of the conference's members were absorbed into the Sun Belt Conference.

== Tournament results ==
Year	Champion	Score	Runner-up	Venue
1988	Louisiana Tech	86–64	New Orleans	Thomas Assembly Center
1989	Louisiana Tech	109–56	Lamar	Thomas Assembly Center
1990	Louisiana Tech	79–58	Lamar	Thomas Assembly Center
1991	Louisiana Tech	77–76	Lamar	Thomas Assembly Center

== Finals appearances by school ==
School	Championships	Finals Appearances	Years
Louisiana Tech	4	4	1988, 1989, 1990 1991
Lamar	0	3	
New Orleans	0	1	
