= Tank Collins =

Retired American expatriate professional basketball player

Personal information
- Born: January 28, 1969 (age 57) Pomona, California, U.S.
- Listed height: 6 ft 5 in (1.96 m)
- Listed weight: 215 lb (98 kg)

Career information
- High school: Pomona (Pomona, California)
- College: Salt Lake CC (1987–1989); New Orleans (1989–1991)
- NBA draft: 1991: undrafted
- Playing career: 1991–1993
- Position: Power forward

Career history
- 1991: Bakersfield Jammers
- 1992: Huntsville Lasers
- 1992: Presto Ice Cream
- 1992–1993: Yakima Sun Kings
- 1993: Halifax Windjammers

Career highlights
- CBA All-Star (1993); American South Player of the Year (1991); First-team All-American South (1991)

Derwin F. "Tank" Collins (born January 28, 1969) is an American former professional basketball player. He played for Presto Ice Cream in the Philippine Basketball Association but is best known for his high school and college careers in the United States.

== Early life and high school ==
A native of Pomona, California, Collins was not athletic as a child and gave up playing sports. When he was in seventh grade, Collins' father suddenly died. His mother forced him to play basketball to distract him from the death during the summer between his seventh and eighth grade years and would even play Tank herself. She would beat him in one-on-one until he became too good, at which point his older brothers began playing physically with Tank. This laid the foundation for his aggressive style which would come to benefit him later.

By the time he got to high school, Collins was utilizing his 6-foot-5-inch (1.96 m), 215-pound (98 kg) stature to dominate his opponents. He earned the nickname "Tank" from his physique and physicality. One coach said, "He's like a 500-pound gorilla. He can do anything he wants." Collins kept improving, learned to shoot accurately from beyond 15 feet and quickly became one of the most sought-after high school recruits in California.

During his senior year at Pomona High School, however, he was declared academically ineligible to play most of the season due to poor grades. Through his first seven games he had been averaging 28.6 points and 17.1 rebounds per game. Collins claimed that his focus on basketball as well as the attention he was receiving from 100+ college scouts distracted him from concentrating on his classwork. He did manage to play in the final few games of the season, but he had already proven himself enough to college recruiters where it did not affect his desirability to college recruiters.

== College and later life ==
Tank Collins had to play basketball at a junior college for two seasons to improve his grades before he was able to play NCAA Division I basketball. After his brief junior college career, he chose to play basketball for the Privateers of the University of New Orleans (UNO). Between 1989–90 and 1990–91, Collins helped guide UNO to a period of great success. The Privateers won American South Conference (ASC) regular season championships, outright or shared, in both years Collins played. Their season records were:

- 1989–90 season — 21–11 (8–2 ASC) → co-regular season and ASC conference tournament champions
- 1990–91 season — 23–8 (9–3 ASC) → co-regular season champions

New Orleans also qualified for NCAA postseason tournaments in each of his two seasons. They earned a berth into the National Invitation Tournament (NIT) in 1990 and advanced to the quarterfinal round. In Collins' senior season he led UNO in scoring with a 17.3 points per game average. They advanced to the 1991 NCAA Tournament but lost to Kansas, 55–49, in the opening round. To conclude his collegiate career, Tank was named the American South Conference Men's Basketball Player of the Year.

== Professional career ==
Collins started his professional career with the Bakersfield Jammers of the Continental Basketball Association (CBA) until the team folded in December 1991. He averaged 18.3 points and 5.5 rebounds in 23 games played. On January 14, 1992, Collins was acquired by the Huntsville Lasers of the Global Basketball Association (GBA). On February 5, he departed the Lasers after he received an offer to play in the Philippines. Collins played for Presto Ice Cream in the Philippine Basketball Association (PBA) during the 1992 PBA First Conference.

Collins joined the Utah Jazz for the 1992 NBA Summer League. He played for the Yakima Sun Kings of the CBA for the 1992–93 season. Collins averaged 20.2 points and 5.2 rebounds per game and was selected to the 1993 CBA All-Star Game.

Collins played for the Halifax Windjammers of the Canadian National Basketball League (NBL) during the 1993 season. On September 16, 1993, Collins was traded by the Yakima Sun Kings to the Fargo-Moorhead Fever. He was expected to miss the start of the season due to a knee injury that he suffered during his stint in Canada.
