= 1990 American South Conference men's basketball tournament =

- Classification: Division I
- Season: 1989–90
- Teams: 6
- Finals site: Convocation Center; Jonesboro, AR
- Champions: New Orleans (1st title)
- Winning coach: Tim Floyd (1st title)

1989–90 American South Conference men's basketball standings
	Conf.				Overall
Team	W		L	PCT	W		L	PCT
Louisiana Tech	8	–	2	.800	20	–	8	.714
New Orleans †	8	–	2	.800	21	–	11	.656
Texas–Pan American	7	–	3	.700	21	–	9	.700
Southwestern Louisiana	4	–	6	.400	20	–	9	.690
Arkansas State	2	–	8	.200	15	–	13	.536
Lamar	1	–	9	.100	7	–	21	.250
† 1990 American South tournament winner Rankings from AP Poll

The 1990 American South Conference men's basketball tournament was held March 2–4 at the Convocation Center at Arkansas State University in Jonesboro, Arkansas.

New Orleans defeated Texas–Pan American in the championship game, 48–44, to take home their first American South men's basketball tournament title.

The Privateers did not receive an automatic invitation to the 1990 NCAA Tournament. Instead, they participated in the 1990 National Invitation Tournament.

== Format ==
All six of the conference's founding members participated in the tournament field. They were seeded based on regular season conference records. The top two teams were given byes into the semifinals while the bottom four teams were placed and paired into the initial quarterfinal round.

All games were played at the Convocation Center in Jonesboro, Arkansas.

== Bracket ==
Quarterfinals; Friday, March 2
5	Arkansas State	69
4	Southwestern Louisiana	83
3	Texas–Pan American	92
6	Lamar	82

Semifinals; Saturday, March 3
1	New Orleans	91
4	Southwestern Louisiana	76
3	Texas–Pan American	82
2	Louisiana Tech	76

Championship; Sunday, March 4
1	New Orleans	48
3	Texas–Pan American	44
