= Ledell Eackles =

American basketball player (born 1966)

Personal information
- Born: November 24, 1966 (age 59) Baton Rouge, Louisiana, U.S.
- Listed height: 6 ft 5 in (1.96 m)
- Listed weight: 220 lb (100 kg)

Career information
- High school: Broadmoor (Baton Rouge, Louisiana)
- College: San Jacinto (1984–1986); New Orleans (1986–1988)
- NBA draft: 1988: 2nd round, 36th overall pick
- Drafted by: Washington Bullets
- Playing career: 1988–2000
- Position: Shooting guard
- Number: 21

Career history
- 1988–1992: Washington Bullets
- 1992–1993: Rapid City Thrillers
- 1994–1995: Miami Heat
- 1995–1998: Washington Bullets / Wizards
- 1999–2000: Richmond Rhythm

Career highlights
- American South Player of the Year (1988); 2× First-team All-American South (1987, 1988); American South Newcomer of the Year (1987)

Career NBA statistics
- Points: 4,783 (10.8 ppg)
- Stats at NBA.com
- Stats at Basketball Reference

Ledell Eackles (born November 24, 1966) is an American former professional basketball player who was selected by the Washington Bullets in the second round (36th overall pick) of the 1988 NBA draft. Eackles played in seven NBA seasons for the Bullets, Miami Heat and Washington Wizards, averaging 10.8 ppg in his career. His best season came during 1989–90 when he appeared in 78 games for the Bullets averaging 13.5 points.

Eackles played college basketball for the New Orleans Privateers and prepped at Broadmoor High School in Baton Rouge.

One of Eackles' sons, Ledell Eackles Jr., won two state championships at Woodlawn High School in Baton Rouge and played college basketball for Campbell College. Another son, Ledrick, played basketball at McNeese State after transferring from Oakland University.

== Career statistics ==
Legend
GP	Games played	GS	Games started	MPG	Minutes per game
FG%	Field goal percentage	3P%	3-point field goal percentage	FT%	Free throw percentage
RPG	Rebounds per game	APG	Assists per game	SPG	Steals per game
BPG	Blocks per game	PPG	Points per game	**Bold**	Career high

=== NBA ===
==== Regular season ====
Year	Team	GP	GS	MPG	FG%	3P%	FT%	RPG	APG	SPG	BPG	PPG
1988–89	Washington	**80**	6	18.2	.434	.225	.786	2.3	1.5	.5	**.1**	11.5
1989–90	Washington	78	8	21.7	.439	.322	.750	2.2	**2.3**	.6	**.1**	**13.5**
1990–91	Washington	67	17	**24.1**	.453	.237	.739	1.9	2.0	**.7**	**.1**	13.0
1991–92	Washington	65	25	22.5	**.468**	.200	.743	**2.7**	1.9	**.7**	**.1**	13.2
1994–95	Miami	54	6	16.6	.439	**.439**	.722	1.8	1.3	.4	.0	7.3
1995–96	Washington	55	**26**	22.5	.427	.422	.831	**2.7**	1.6	.5	**.1**	8.6
1997–98	Washington	42	0	13.0	.429	.348	**.881**	1.8	.4	.4	.0	5.2
Career		441	88	20.2	.445	.336	.767	2.2	1.7	.6	.1	10.8
