= American South Conference Men's Basketball Player of the Year =

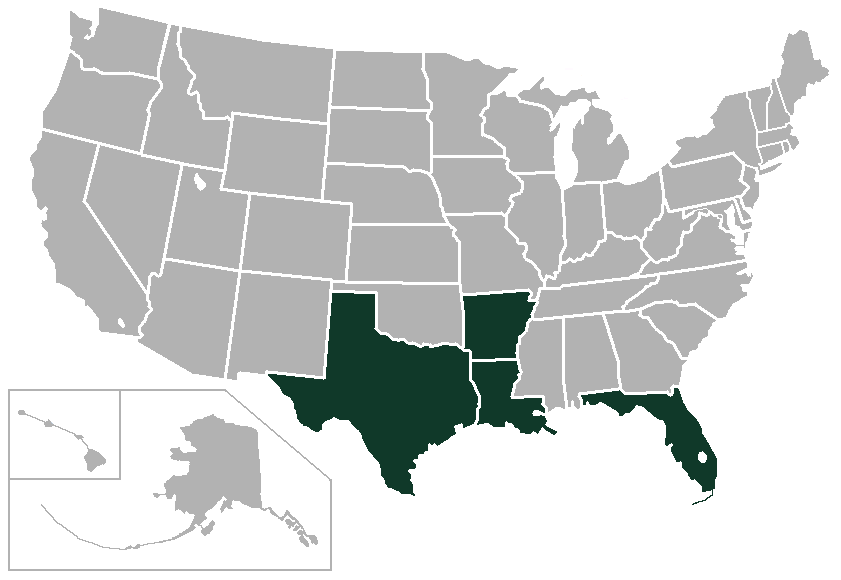
- Awarded for: the most outstanding basketball player in the American South Conference
- Country: United States

History
- First award: 1988
- Final award: 1991

The American South Conference Men's Basketball Player of the Year is an award given to the American South Conference's most outstanding player. Both the conference and the award were short-lived and only handed out from 1988 to 1991. Four recipients received the award, three of which played for the University of New Orleans. The American South Conference merged with the Sun Belt Conference following the 1990–91 season.

== Winners ==
Season	Player	School	Position	Class	Reference
1987–88	Ledell Eackles	New Orleans	SG	Senior	
1988–89	Randy White	Louisiana Tech	PF	Senior	
1989–90	Tony Harris	New Orleans	SG	Senior	
1990–91	Tank Collins	New Orleans	PF	Senior	

== Winners by school ==
School (year joined)	Winners	Years
New Orleans (1987)	3	1988, 1990, 1991
Louisiana Tech (1987)	1	1989
Arkansas State (1987)	0	—
Central Florida (1990)	0	—
Lamar (1987)	0	—
Southwestern Louisiana (1987)	0	—
Texas–Pan American (1987)	0	—
