= Tommy Joe Eagles =

American college basketball coach (1949–1994)

Biographical details
- Born: April 3, 1949
- Died: July 30, 1994 (aged 45); Salt Lake City, Utah, U.S.

Playing career
- 1967–1971: Louisiana Tech

Coaching career (HC unless noted)
- 1971–1974: Simsboro HS (LA)
- 1974–1979: Cedar Creek HS (LA)
- 1979–1985: Louisiana Tech (assistant)
- 1985–1989: Louisiana Tech
- 1989–1994: Auburn

Head coaching record
- Overall: 151–118 (.561) (college)
- Tournaments: 1–2 (NCAA Division I); 5–3 (NIT)

Accomplishments and honors

Championships
- Southland regular season (1987); Southland tournament (1987); ASC regular season (1988); 2 ASC tournament (1988, 1989)

Awards
- Southland Coach of the Year (1987); ASC Coach of the Year (1988); SEC Coach of the Year (1990)

Tommy Joe Eagles (April 3, 1949 – July 30, 1994) was the head basketball coach of the Louisiana Tech Bulldogs from 1985 to 1989 and the Auburn Tigers from 1989 to 1994. He was head coach of the University of New Orleans men's basketball team, but died before he ever coached a game there due to a heart attack he suffered during a recruiting trip on July 30, 1994. Before his coaching stint at Louisiana Tech, Eagles served as head coach at Cedar Creek High School in Ruston and Simsboro High School in Simsboro, both in Lincoln Parish.

Each year, Louisiana Tech University presents the Tommy Joe Eagles Award to the member of the Louisiana Tech Men's Basketball team who shows the best all-around combination of work ethic, academic ability, character, and attitude. Past recipients include Brian Martin (2004) and Shawn Oliverson (2010). Auburn University presents the Paul Lambert/Tommy Joe Eagles Memorial Trophy for Leadership, the most prestigious award of the men's basketball program, at the end of each season. Past recipients include Wes Flanigan (1996, 1997) and Daymeon Fishback (2000).

Eagles played basketball and graduated in 1967 from Doyline High School in Doyline, Louisiana, located in Webster Parish, Louisiana. He was one of three children of the late Edward P. and Juanita W. Eagles. His siblings were M. E. "Bo" Eagles, a businessman from Houston, Texas, and Anita E. Darbonne of Minden.

== Head coaching record ==
Record table
Season	Team	Overall	Conference	Standing	Postseason
Louisiana Tech Bulldogs (Southland Conference) (1985–1987)
1985–86	Louisiana Tech	20–14	6–6	T–4th	NIT Third Place
1986–87	Louisiana Tech	22–8	9–1	1st	NCAA Division I First Round
Louisiana Tech Bulldogs (American South Conference) (1987–1989)
1987–88	Louisiana Tech	22–9	7–3	T–1st	NIT Second Round
1988–89	Louisiana Tech	23–9	6–4	T–2nd	NCAA Division I Second Round
Louisiana Tech:		87–40 (.685)	28–14 (.667)		
Auburn Tigers (Southeastern Conference) (1989–1994)
1989–90	Auburn	13–18	8–10	T–6th	
1990–91	Auburn	13–16	5–13	8th	
1991–92	Auburn	12–15	5–11	5th (West)	
1992–93	Auburn	15–12	8–8	3rd (West)	NIT First Round
1993–94	Auburn	11–17	3–13	6th (West)	
Auburn:		64–78 (.451)	29–55 (.345)		
Total:		151–118 (.561)			
National champion Postseason invitational champion Conference regular season champion Conference regular season and conference tournament champion Division regular season champion Division regular season and conference tournament champion Conference tournament champion
