= American South Conference men's basketball tournament =

American South Conference men's basketball tournament (defunct)
- Conference basketball championship
- Sport: College basketball
- Conference: American South Conference
- Format: Single-elimination tournament
- Played: 1988–1991
- Current champion: Louisiana Tech
- Most championships: Louisiana Tech (3)

Host stadiums
- Montagne Center (1988) Cajundome (1989); Convocation Center (1990) Lakefront Arena (1991)

Host locations
- Beaumont, TX (1988) Lafayette, LA (1989); Jonesboro, AR (1990) New Orleans, LA (1991)

The American South Conference men's basketball tournament was the conference championship tournament in men's basketball for the American South Conference (ASC). The tournament was held annually between 1988 and 1991, after which most of the conference's members were absorbed into the Sun Belt Conference.

Due to NCAA rules regarding minimum number of tournament eligible members, the conference champion did not receive an automatic bid into the tournament in each of its first three editions, before Louisiana Tech received the conference's first and only automatic bid in 1991.

== Tournament results ==
Year	Champion	Score	Runner-up	Venue (and city)
1988	Louisiana Tech	69–66	New Orleans	Montagne Center (Beaumont, TX)
1989	Louisiana Tech	84–62	New Orleans	Cajundome (Lafayette, LA)
1990	New Orleans	48–44	Texas–Pan American	Convocation Center (Jonesboro, AR)
1991	Louisiana Tech	61–56	New Orleans	Lakefront Arena (New Orleans, LA)

== Finals appearances by school ==
School	Championships	Finals Appearances	Years
Louisiana Tech	3	3	1988, 1989, 1991
New Orleans	1	4	1990
Texas–Pan American	0	1	
