= 1990 NAIA women's basketball tournament =

- Teams: 16
- Finals site: Oman Arena, Jackson, Tennessee
- Champions: SW Oklahoma State Bulldogs (5th title, 5th title game, 5th Fab Four)
- Runner-up: Arkansas–Monticello Cotton Blossoms (1st title game, 1st Fab Four)
- Semifinalists: Claflin Lady Panthers (3rd Fab Four); St. Ambrose Fighting Bees (2nd Fab Four)
- Coach of the year: John Loftin (SW Oklahoma State)
- Charles Stevenson Hustle Award: Rose Avery (Arkansas–Monticello)
- Chuck Taylor MVP: Tina Webb (Arkansas–Monticello)
- Top scorer: Tina Webb (Arkansas–Monticello) (129 points)

The 1990 NAIA women's basketball tournament was the tenth annual tournament held by the NAIA to determine the national champion of women's college basketball among its members in the United States and Canada.

Southwestern Oklahoma State defeated Arkansas–Monticello in the championship game, 82–75, to claim the Bulldogs' fifth NAIA national title and first since 1987.

The tournament was played at the Oman Arena in Jackson, Tennessee.

== Qualification ==
The tournament field remained fixed at sixteen teams, with seeds assigned to the top eight teams.

The tournament utilized a simple single-elimination format.

== Bracket ==
Round of 16
1	St. Ambrose	97
Campbellsville	83
Central State (OH)	97
8	Wingate	77
5	Northern Montana	65
Western New Mexico	72
Georgian Court	54
4	SW Oklahoma State	77
3	Claflin	92
Charleston (WV)	68
Minnesota Duluth	56
6	Simon Fraser	79
7	David Lipscomb	74
Wayland Baptist	86
Aquinas (MI)	55
2	Arkansas–Monticello	80

Quarterfinals
1	St. Ambrose	81
Central State (OH)	73
Western New Mexico	42
4	SW Oklahoma State	76
3	Claflin	104*
6	Simon Fraser	98
Wayland Baptist	67
2	Arkansas–Monticello	105

Semifinals
1	St. Ambrose	76
4	SW Oklahoma State	83
3	Claflin	86
2	Arkansas–Monticello	93

National championship
4	SW Oklahoma State	82
2	Arkansas–Monticello	75

== See also ==
- 1990 NCAA Division I women's basketball tournament
- 1990 NCAA Division II women's basketball tournament
- 1990 NCAA Division III women's basketball tournament
- 1990 NAIA men's basketball tournament
