= 1988–89 Louisiana Tech Bulldogs basketball team =

American college basketball season

1988–89 Louisiana Tech Bulldogs men's basketball

American South tournament champions

NCAA tournament, second round
- Conference: American South Conference
- Record: 23–9 (6–4 American South)
- Head coach: Tommy Joe Eagles
- Home arena: Thomas Assembly Center

1988–89 American South Conference men's basketball standings
| | Conf. | | | | Overall |
| Team | W | | L | PCT | W | | L | PCT |
|---|---|---|---|---|---|---|---|---|
| New Orleans | 7 | – | 3 | .700 | 19 | – | 11 | .633 |
| Louisiana Tech † | 6 | – | 4 | .600 | 23 | – | 9 | .719 |
| Arkansas State | 6 | – | 4 | .600 | 20 | – | 10 | .667 |
| Southwestern Louisiana | 4 | – | 6 | .400 | 17 | – | 12 | .586 |
| Pan American | 4 | – | 6 | .400 | 15 | – | 13 | .536 |
| Lamar | 3 | – | 7 | .300 | 12 | – | 16 | .429 |
† 1989 American South tournament winner Rankings from AP Poll

The 1988–89 Louisiana Tech Bulldogs basketball team represented Louisiana Tech University in Ruston, Louisiana as members of the American South Conference during the 1988–89 season. The Bulldogs were led by head coach Tommy Joe Eagles. Louisiana Tech finished second in the American South regular season standings (6–4), but would earn an automatic berth in the NCAA tournament by winning the conference tournament championship. After defeating La Salle in the opening round, the Bulldogs lost to No. 1 seed Oklahoma in the second round.

== Roster ==
1988–89 Louisiana Tech Bulldogs men's basketball team
Players
Coaches

| Pos. | # | Name | Height | Weight | Year | Hometown |
|---|---|---|---|---|---|---|
| F | 15 | Anthony Dade | 6 ft 6 in (1.98 m) | 225 lb (102 kg) | Fr |
| G | 40 | Byron Newton | 6 ft 5 in (1.96 m) | — | Sr |
| C | 42 | P. J. Brown | 6 ft 11 in (2.11 m) | 225 lb (102 kg) | Fr | Winnfield, Louisiana |
| C | 44 | Robert McAlister | 6 ft 9 in (2.06 m) | — | Sr |
| F | 52 | Randy White | 6 ft 8 in (2.03 m) | 235 lb (107 kg) | Sr | Shreveport, Louisiana |
| F | 53 | Michael Ames | 6 ft 6 in (1.98 m) | — | Sr |
| G | | Darryl Knight | 6 ft 4 in (1.93 m) | — | Sr |
| G | | Brett Guillory | 6 ft 1 in (1.85 m) | — | Jr |
| G | | Kennedy Louis | 6 ft 4 in (1.93 m) | — | Sr |
| G | | Mark Watley | 6 ft 0 in (1.83 m) | — | Jr |
| G | | JoJo Goldsmith | 6 ft 3 in (1.91 m) | — | Fr |
| F | | Vernon Norris | 6 ft 6 in (1.98 m) | — | Jr |
| F | | Dickie Crawford | 6 ft 5 in (1.96 m) | — | Jr |

Head coach

- Tommy Joe Eagles

Assistant coach(es)

Legend

- (C) Team captain
- (S) Suspended
- (I) Ineligible
- (W) Walk-on
- Injured
- Current redshirt

== Schedule and results ==
| Date time, TV | Rank^{#} | Opponent^{#} | Result | Record | Site city, state |
Regular season
| Nov 26, 1988* | | at North Texas | W 87–72 | 1–0 | Super Pit; Denton, Texas |
| Nov 29, 1988* | | Fresno State | W 75–59 | 2–0 | Thomas Assembly Center; Ruston, Louisiana |
| Dec 2, 1988* | | vs. Miami (OH); Carrier Classic | W 69–62 | 3–0 | Carrier Dome; Syracuse, New York |
| Dec 3, 1988* | | at No. 4 Syracuse; Carrier Classic | L 98–106 ^{OT} | 3–1 | Carrier Dome; Syracuse, New York |
| Dec 6, 1988* | | at LSU | W 111–109 | 4–1 | Maravich Assembly Center; Baton Rouge, Louisiana |
| Dec 20, 1988* | | at Middle Tennessee | L 87–91 | 6–4 | Murphy Athletic Center; Murfreesboro, Tennessee |
| Jan 12, 1989* | | Middle Tennessee | W 72–71 | 10–4 | Thomas Assembly Center; Ruston, Louisiana |
| Jan 16, 1989* | | at McNeese State | W 70–64 | 11–4 | Burton Coliseum; Lake Charles, Louisiana |
American South Conference tournament
| Mar 3, 1989* | | vs. Lamar; American South Conference tournament Quarterfinal | W 103–80 | 20–8 | Cajundome; Lafayette, Louisiana |
| Mar 4, 1989* | | vs. Arkansas State; American South Conference tournament Semifinal | W 82–65 | 21–8 | Cajundome; Lafayette, Louisiana |
| Mar 5, 1989* | | vs. New Orleans; American South Conference tournament championship | W 84–62 | 22–8 | Cajundome; Lafayette, Louisiana |
NCAA tournament
| Mar 16, 1989* | (9 SE) | vs. (8 SE) La Salle; First Round | W 83–74 | 23–8 | Memorial Gymnasium; Nashville, Tennessee |
| Mar 18, 1989* | (9 SE) | vs. (1 SE) No. 4 Oklahoma; Second Round | L 81–124 | 23–9 | Memorial Gymnasium; Nashville, Tennessee |
*Non-conference game. ^{#}Rankings from AP Poll. (#) Tournament seedings in parentheses. SE=Southeast.

== NBA draft ==
| Round | Pick | Player | NBA Club |
|---|---|---|---|
| 1 | 8 | Randy White | Dallas Mavericks |
