= Simsboro High School =

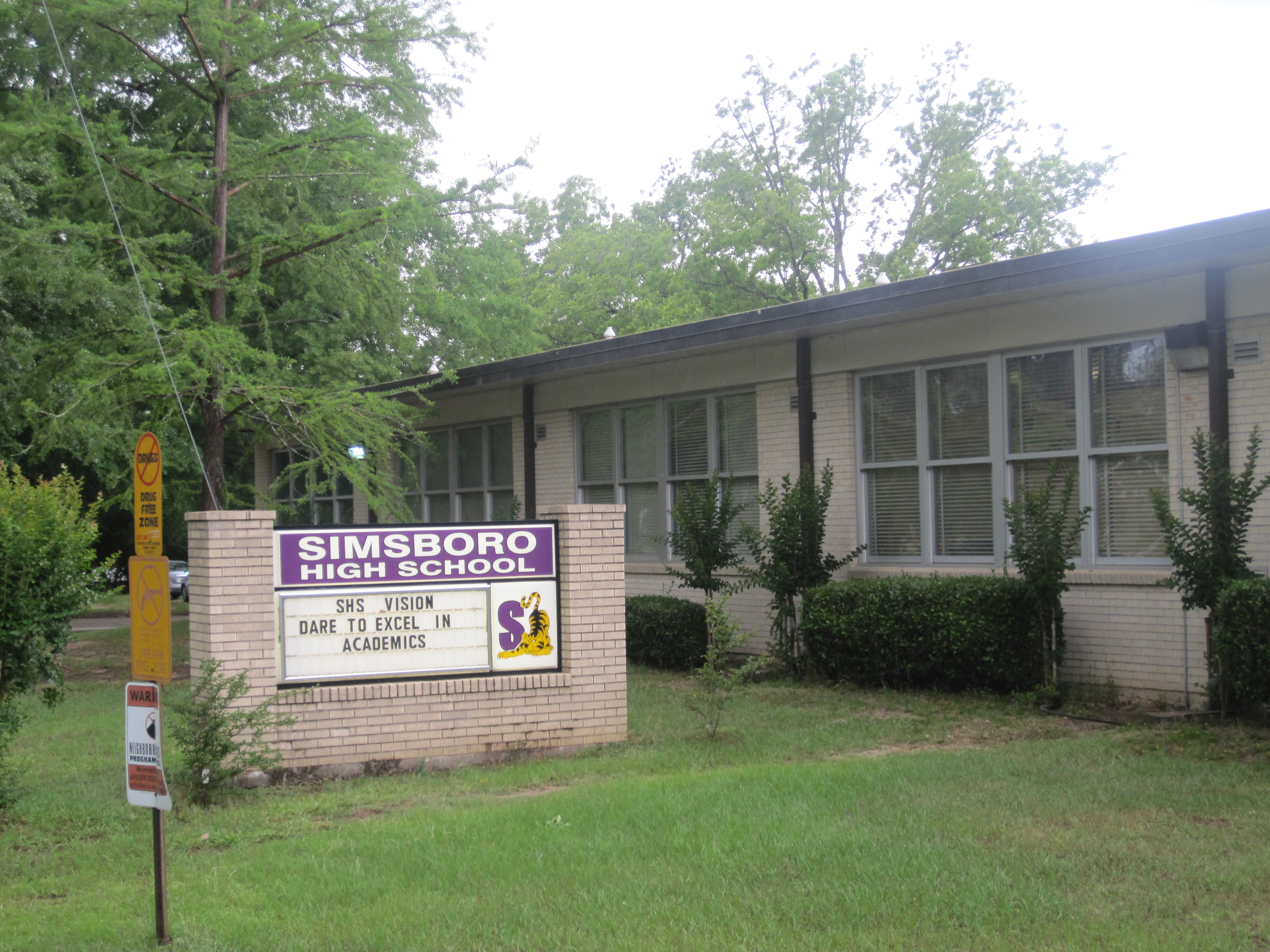
- Simsboro High School in May 2010

Location
- 1 Tiger Drive; Simsboro, Louisiana; United States; 32.53404°N 92.78672°W

Information
- Type: Public
- Principal: Lacey Holcomb
- Teaching staff: 44.22 (FTE)
- Grades: PK-12th
- Enrollment: 553 (2023-2024)
- Student to teacher ratio: 12.51
- Colors: Purple and gold
- Mascot: Tiger
- Nickname: T Bone
- Rival: Choudrant High School
- Website: simsboro.lincolnschools.org/o/shs

Simsboro High School is in Simsboro, Louisiana, United States, and is a part of the Lincoln Parish School Board

== History ==
Simsboro High School was founded in 1855 by James M. Sims. The school became recognized by the state in 1904 and saw the addition of a junior high wing in 2006. The principal is Ms.Lacey Holcomb

== Student life ==
Simsboro High School educates children in grades Kindergarten through 12. Students can also participate in cheerleading, student government, or clubs and activities such as 4-H. Junior high cheerleading has been added for the 2024-2025 school year.

== Athletics ==
Simsboro High athletics competes in the LHSAA.

The school fields teams in baseball, boys & girls basketball, softball, and track & field.

== Notable alumni ==
- L.D. "Buddy" Napper, state representative for Lincoln Parish from 1952 to 1964

== Notable faculty ==
- Tommy Joe Eagles, basketball coach prior to taking head coaching position at Louisiana Tech University
