= 1990 NCAA Division II women's basketball tournament =

American collegiate basketball tournament

- Teams: 32
- Finals site: , Pomona, California
- Champions: Delta State Lady Statesmen (2nd title)
- Runner-up: Bentley Falcons (1st title game)
- Third place: Cal Poly Pomona Broncos (7th Final Four)
- Fourth place: Oakland Pioneers (2nd Final Four)
- Winning coach: Lloyd Clark (2nd title)
- MOP: Crystal Hardy (Delta State)

The 1990 NCAA Division II women's basketball tournament was the ninth annual tournament hosted by the NCAA to determine the national champion of Division II women's collegiate basketball in the United States.

Defending champions Delta State defeated Bentley in the championship game, 77–43, claiming the Lady Statesmen's second NCAA Division II national title.

The championship rounds were contested in Pomona, California.

== Regionals ==
=== New England - Waltham, Massachusetts ===
Location: Dana Center Host: Bentley College

Regional semifinals Round of 32; March 9
Bentley	75
Keene State	48
Saint Anselm	86
New Hampshire College	73

Regional final Sweet 16; March 10
Bentley	65
Saint Anselm	44

=== South Atlantic - Louisville, Kentucky ===
Location: Knights Hall Host: Bellarmine College

Regional semifinals Round of 32; March 9
Florida Atlantic	73
Virginia State	62
Bellarmine	71
Pace	60

Regional final Sweet 16; March 10
Florida Atlantic	55
Bellarmine	62

=== South Central - Warrensburg, Missouri ===
Location: CMSU Fieldhouse Host: Central Missouri State University

Regional semifinals Round of 32; March 9
West Texas State	62
NW Missouri State	48
Central Missouri State	79
SE Missouri State	68

Regional final Sweet 16; March 10
West Texas State	63
Central Missouri State	67

=== Great Lakes - Rochester, Michigan ===
Location: Lepley Sports Center Host: Oakland University

Regional semifinals Round of 32; March 9
Saint Joseph's (IN)	83
Grand Valley State	72
Oakland	87
IPFW	83

Regional final Sweet 16; March 10
St. Joseph's (IN)	86
Oakland	89

=== East - Edinboro, Pennsylvania ===
Location: McComb Fieldhouse Host: Edinboro State College of Pennsylvania

Regional semifinals Round of 32; March 9
Lock Haven	76
Pitt Johnstown	72
Edinboro	82
Bloomsburg	62

Regional final Sweet 16; March 10
Lock Haven	89
Edinboro	70

=== South - Cleveland, Mississippi ===
Location: Walter Sillers Coliseum Host: Delta State University

Regional semifinals Round of 32; March 9
Jacksonville State	77
West Georgia	66
Delta State	74
Albany State	42

Regional final Sweet 16; March 10
Jacksonville State	56
Delta State	92

=== North Central - Grand Forks, North Dakota ===
Location: Hyslop Sports Center Host: University of North Dakota

Regional semifinals Round of 32; March 9
North Dakota State	91
St. Cloud State	74
North Dakota	93
Augustana (SD)	78

Regional final Sweet 16; March 10
North Dakota State	58
North Dakota	90

=== West - Davis, California ===
Location: Recreation Hall Host: University of California, Davis

Regional semifinals Round of 32; March 9
Stanislaus State	78
UC Davis	70
Cal Poly Pomona	89
Air Force	63

Regional final Sweet 16; March 10
Stanislaus State	54
Cal Poly Pomona	59

== National Finals - Pomona, California ==
Final Four Location: Kellogg Gym Host: California State Polytechnic University, Pomona

National quarterfinals Elite Eight; See below
Bentley	74
Bellarmine	59
March 17 - Waltham, Mass. March 16 - Warrensburg, Missouri
Central Missouri State	61
Oakland	66
Lock Haven	59
Delta State	90
March 17 - Cleveland, Mississippi; March 16 - Pomona, California
North Dakota	64
Cal Poly Pomona	67

National semifinals Final Four; March 23
Bentley	72
Oakland	68
Delta State	67
Cal Poly Pomona	53

National championship March 24
Bentley	43
Delta State	77
Third place
Oakland	68
Cal Poly Pomona	87

== All-tournament team ==
- Crystal Hardy, Delta State
- Pam Lockett, Delta State
- Tracie Seymour, Bentley
- Niki Bracken, Cal Poly Pomona
- Debbie Delie, Oakland

== See also ==
- 1990 NCAA Division I women's basketball tournament
- 1990 NCAA Division III women's basketball tournament
- 1990 NCAA Division II men's basketball tournament
- 1990 NAIA women's basketball tournament
