= 1986–87 Louisiana Tech Bulldogs basketball team =

American college basketball season

1986–87 Louisiana Tech Bulldogs men's basketball

Southland Regular season champions Southland tournament champions

NCAA tournament, second round
- Conference: Southland Conference
- Record: 22–8 (9–1 Southland)
- Head coach: Tommy Joe Eagles
- Home arena: Thomas Assembly Center

1986–87 Southland Conference men's basketball standings
	Conf.				Overall
Team	W		L	PCT	W		L	PCT
Louisiana Tech †	9	–	1	.900	22	–	8	.733
Arkansas State	5	–	5	.500	21	–	13	.618
McNeese State	5	–	5	.500	14	–	14	.500
Lamar	4	–	6	.400	14	–	15	.483
North Texas State	4	–	6	.400	11	–	17	.393
Northeast Louisiana	3	–	7	.300	13	–	15	.464
UT Arlington		–		–	12	–	18	.400
† 1987 Southland Conference tournament winner Rankings from AP Poll

The 1986–87 Louisiana Tech Bulldogs basketball team represented Louisiana Tech University in Ruston, Louisiana as members of the Southland Conference during the 1986–87 season. The Bulldogs were led by head coach Tommy Joe Eagles. Louisiana Tech finished atop the Southland regular season standings (9–1) and would earn an automatic berth in the NCAA tournament by winning the conference tournament championship. The Bulldogs lost to No. 3 seed DePaul in the opening round.

== Roster ==
1986–87 Louisiana Tech Bulldogs men's basketball team
Players	Coaches
Pos. / # / Name / Height / Weight / Year / Hometown; F / 52 / Randy White / 6 ft 8 in (2.03 m) / 235 lb (107 kg) / So / Shreveport, Louisiana	Head coach: Tommy Joe Eagles; Assistant coach(es) Legend: (C) Team captain; (S) Suspended; (I) Ineligible; (W) Walk-on; Injured; Current redshirt

== Schedule and results ==
Date time, TV	Rank^{#}	Opponent^{#}	Result	Record	Site city, state
Exhibition
Nov 23, 1986*		Windsor Club	W 86–67		Thomas Assembly Center (1,350); Ruston, Louisiana
Regular season
Nov 29, 1986*		vs. Arkansas	L 64–90	0–1	(7,854)
Dec 1, 1986*		Concordia Lutheran	W 122–70	1–1	Thomas Assembly Center (1,625); Ruston, Louisiana
Dec 3, 1986*		at Tennessee	L 56–63	1–2	(10,607)
Dec 6, 1986*		at Stephen F. Austin	L 79–81 ^{OT}	1–3	(1,630)
Dec 8, 1986*		Georgia College	W 70–59	2–3	Thomas Assembly Center (1,775); Ruston, Louisiana
Dec 13, 1986*		South Alabama	W 82–75	3–3	Thomas Assembly Center (1,525); Ruston, Louisiana
Dec 19, 1986*		vs. Duquesne	W 82–64	4–3	Thomas & Mack Center (2,500); Las Vegas, Nevada
Dec 20, 1986*		at No. 1 UNLV	L 75–79	4–4	Thomas & Mack Center (15,954); Las Vegas, Nevada
Dec 23, 1986*		at Weber State	W 70–69 ^{OT}	5–4	(7,552)
Dec 27, 1986*		vs. Washington	W 88–87	6–4	(11,983)
Dec 28, 1986*		vs. Oregon State	W 93–76	7–4	(8,680)
Dec 29, 1986*		vs. Oregon	W 57–50	8–4	(8,189)
Southland Conference tournament
Mar 4, 1987*		Lamar; Semifinals	W 70–64	21–7	Thomas Assembly Center; Ruston, Louisiana
Mar 5, 1987*		Arkansas State; Championship game	W 58–51	22–7	Thomas Assembly Center; Ruston, Louisiana
NCAA tournament
Mar 13, 1987*	(14 MW)	vs. (3 MW) No. 5 DePaul	L 62–76	22–8	Rosemont Horizon; Rosemont, Illinois
*Non-conference game. ^{#}Rankings from AP Poll. (#) Tournament seedings in parentheses. MW=Midwest.
