= 1990 NCAA Division III women's basketball tournament =

- Teams: 32
- Finals site: , Hope, Michigan
- Champions: Hope Flying Dutchmen (1st title)
- Runner-up: St. John Fisher Cardinals (2nd title game)
- Third place: Heidelberg Student Princes (1st Final Four)
- Fourth place: Centre Colonels (2nd Final Four)
- Winning coach: Sue Wise (1st title)

The 1990 NCAA Division III women's basketball tournament was the ninth annual tournament hosted by the NCAA to determine the national champion of Division III women's collegiate basketball in the United States.

Hope defeated St. John Fisher in the championship game, 65–63, to claim the Flying Dutchmen's first Division III national title.

The championship rounds were hosted by Hope College in Holland, Michigan.

== Bracket ==
- An asterisk by a team indicates the host of first and second round games
- An asterisk by a score indicates an overtime period

=== Regional rounds ===
First Round
Buffalo State	77
St. John Fisher	81*
Hartwick	71
Nazareth	61

Regional Championship
St. John Fisher	69*
Hartwick	64
Regional Third-place
Buffalo State	68
Nazareth	55

First Round
Moravian	84
Scranton	87
DeSales	77*
Franklin & Marshall	70

Regional Championship
Scranton	81
DeSales	70
Regional Third-place
Moravian	85
Franklin & Marshall	71

First Round
Salem State	51
Western Connecticut State	53
Eastern Connecticut State	50
Southern Maine	57

Regional Championship
Western Connecticut State	65
Southern Maine	72*
Regional Third-place
Salem State	69
Eastern Connecticut State	73

First Round
Heidelberg	69
Wittenberg	56
Kean	49
Montclair State	57

Regional Championship
Heidelberg	70
Montclair State	49
Regional Third-place
Wittenberg	80
Kean	73

First Round
Colorado College	63
Concordia Moorhead	76
Cal State San Bernardino	49
St. Thomas (MN)	78

Regional Championship
Concordia Moorhead	81*
St. Thomas (MN)	77
Regional Third-place
Colorado College	53
Cal State San Bernardino	64

First Round
Centre (KY)	95
Marymount (VA)	80
Maryville (TN)	64
Roanoke	62

Regional Championship
Centre (KY)	73
Maryville (TN)	63
Regional Third-place
Marymount (VA)	83
Roanoke	90

First Round
Buena Vista	78
Washington St. Louis	71
Augustana (IL)	57
Wartburg	72

Regional Championship
Buena Vista	78
Wartburg	63
Regional Third-place
Washington St. Louis	52
Augustana (IL)	54

First Round
Hope	73
St. Benedict	60
Wisconsin–Eau Claire	65
Wisconsin–Oshkosh	68

Regional Championship
Hope	68
Wisconsin–Oshkosh	67
Regional Third-place
St. Benedict	59
Wisconsin–Eau Claire	67

=== National finals ===
National quarterfinals
St. John Fisher	66
Scranton	60
Heidelberg	71
Southern Maine	62
Centre College	70
Concordia–Moorhead	65
Hope	85*
Buena Vista	79

National semifinals
St. John Fisher	77
Heidelberg	54
Centre College	62
Hope	75

National championship
St. John Fisher	63
Hope	65
National third-place game
Heidelberg	71
Centre (KY)	60

== All-tournament team ==
- Dina Disney, Hope
- Holly VandenBerg, Hope
- Susan Heidt, St. John Fisher
- Michelle Skovrinski, St. John Fisher
- Dortha Ford, Heidelberg

== See also ==
- 1990 NCAA Division I women's basketball tournament
- 1990 NCAA Division II women's basketball tournament
- 1990 NCAA Division III men's basketball tournament
- 1990 NAIA women's basketball tournament
