= 1986–87 Arkansas State Indians men's basketball team =

American college basketball season

1986–87 Arkansas State Indians men's basketball

NIT, First Round
- Conference: Southland Conference
- Record: 21–13 (5–5 Southland)
- Head coach: Nelson Catalina (3rd season)
- Home arena: Indian Fieldhouse

1986–87 Southland Conference men's basketball standings
	Conf.				Overall
Team	W		L	PCT	W		L	PCT
Louisiana Tech †	9	–	1	.900	22	–	8	.733
Arkansas State	5	–	5	.500	21	–	13	.618
McNeese State	5	–	5	.500	14	–	14	.500
Lamar	4	–	6	.400	14	–	15	.483
North Texas State	4	–	6	.400	11	–	17	.393
Northeast Louisiana	3	–	7	.300	13	–	15	.464
UT Arlington		–		–	12	–	18	.400
† 1987 Southland Conference tournament winner Rankings from AP Poll

The 1986–87 Arkansas State Indians men's basketball team was Arkansas State University from Jonesboro, Arkansas in the 1986–87 season. Led by third year head coach Nelson Catalina, Arkansas State made their first postseason appearance since their transition to NCAA Division I in 1975. Catalina remained head coach at ASU until 1995. Arkansas State faced University of Arkansas in the first round of the NIT, their only meeting in men's basketball.

== Postseason results ==
Southland Conference Tournament
3/3/1987 Vs. Louisiana-Monroe - W, 81-80 @ Thomas Assembly Center, Ruston, LA
3/4/1987 Vs. McNeese State - W, 60-59 @ Thomas Assembly Center, Ruston, LA
3/5/1987 Vs. Louisiana Tech - L, 51-58 @ Thomas Assembly Center, Ruston, LA
National Invitation Tournament
3/13/1987 Vs. Arkansas - L, 64-67 OT @ Barnhill Arena, Fayetteville, AR
