= 1990 NCAA Division II men's basketball tournament =

- Teams: 32
- Finals site: Springfield Civic Center, Springfield, Massachusetts
- Champions: Kentucky Wesleyan Panthers (6th title)
- Runner-up: Cal State Bakersfield Roadrunners (1st title game)
- Semifinalists: North Dakota Fighting Sioux (3rd Final Four); Morehouse Fighting Maroon Tigers (1st Final Four)
- Winning coach: Wayne Chapman (2nd title)
- MOP: Wade Green (Cal State Bakersfield)
- Attendance: 60,966

The 1990 NCAA Division II men's basketball tournament involved 32 schools playing in a single-elimination tournament to determine the national champion of men's NCAA Division II college basketball as a culmination of the 1989-90 NCAA Division II men's basketball season. It was won by Kentucky Wesleyan College, with Wade Green of runner-up California State University, Bakersfield named the Most Outstanding Player.

1990 NCAA Division II Men's sites - regionals (cyan) Elite Eight (red)

== Regional participants ==
School	Outcome
Bridgeport	Regional Champion
New Hampshire College	Third Place
New Haven	Fourth Place
St. Anselm	Runner-up

School	Outcome
Cal State Bakersfield	Regional Champion
Central Missouri State	Runner-up
Humboldt State	Third Place
UC Riverside	Fourth Place

School	Outcome
C.W. Post	Third Place
East Stroudsburg	Runner-up
Gannon	Regional Champion
Slippery Rock	Fourth Place

School	Outcome
Florida Tech	Runner-up
Morehouse	Regional Champion
Norfolk State	Third Place
Virginia Union	Fourth Place

School	Outcome
Missouri Western State	Runner-up
Southeast Missouri State	Regional Champion
Southern Indiana	Fourth Place
West Texas State	Third Place

School	Outcome
Ashland	Runner-up
Ferris State	Third Place
Kentucky Wesleyan	Regional Champion
Southwest Baptist	Fourth Place

School	Outcome
Alaska–Anchorage	Fourth Place
Metro State	Runner-up
North Dakota	Regional Champion
South Dakota	Third Place

School	Outcome
Florida Southern	Third Place
Jacksonville State	Regional Champion
North Carolina Central	Runner-up
Tampa	Fourth Place

*denotes tie

== Regionals ==
=== New England - Manchester, New Hampshire ===
Location: NHC Fieldhouse Host: New Hampshire College

Regional semifinals Round of 32; March 17
Bridgeport	83
New Haven	78
St. Anselm	94
New Hampshire College	89

Regional final Sweet 16; March 18
Bridgeport	91
St. Anselm	88

- Third Place - New Hampshire College 91, New Haven 88

=== West - Bakersfield, California ===
Location: CSUB Student Activities Center Host: California State University, Bakersfield

Regional semifinals Round of 32; March 16
Central Missouri State	69
UC Riverside	59
Cal State Bakersfield	76
Humboldt State	58

Regional final Sweet 16; March 17
Central Missouri State	64
Cal State Bakersfield	68

- Third Place - Humboldt State 71, UC Riverside 70

=== East - Erie, Pennsylvania ===
Location: Hammermill Center Host: Gannon University

Regional semifinals Round of 32; March 16
East Stroudsburg	99*
Slippery Rock	98
Gannon	83
C.W. Post	78

Regional final Sweet 16; March 17
East Stroudsburg	63
Gannon	72

- Third Place - C.W. Post 84, Slippery Rock 79

=== South Atlantic - Norfolk, Virginia ===
Location: Joseph G. Echols Memorial Hall Host: Norfolk State University

Regional semifinals Round of 32; March 16
Morehouse	82
Virginia Union	78
Florida Tech	73
Norfolk State	63

Regional final Sweet 16; March 17
Morehouse	81
Florida Tech	77

- Third Place - Norfolk State 102, Virginia Union 93

=== South Central - Cape Girardeau, Missouri ===
Location: Show Me Center Host: Southeast Missouri State University

Regional semifinals Round of 32; March 16
Missouri Western State	73
West Texas State	71
SE Missouri State	91
Southern Indiana	73

Regional final Sweet 16; March 17
Missouri Western State	73
SE Missouri State	88

- Third Place - West Texas State 98, Southern Indiana 92*

=== Great Lakes - Owensboro, Kentucky ===
Location: Owensboro Sportscenter Host: Kentucky Wesleyan College

Regional semifinals Round of 32; March 16
Ashland	68
Southwest Baptist	64
Kentucky Wesleyan	97
Ferris State	72

Regional final Sweet 16; March 17
Ashland	75
Kentucky Wesleyan	79

- Third Place - Ferris State 88, Southwest Baptist 80*

=== North Central - Grand Forks, North Dakota ===
Location: Hyslop Sports Center Host: University of North Dakota

Regional semifinals Round of 32; March 16
Metro State	82
South Dakota	73
North Dakota	78
Alaska–Anchorage	71

Regional final Sweet 16; March 17
Metro State	80
North Dakota	85

- Third Place - South Dakota 101, Alaska–Anchorage 92

=== South - Lakeland, Florida ===
Location: Jenkins Field House Host: Florida Southern College

Regional semifinals Round of 32; March 16
North Carolina Central	66
Tampa	61
Jacksonville State	97*
Florida Southern	96

Regional final Sweet 16; March 17
North Carolina Central	88
Jacksonville State	95*

- Third Place - Florida Southern 92, Tampa 82

*denotes each overtime played

== Elite Eight - Springfield, Massachusetts ==
Location: Springfield Civic Center Hosts: American International College and Springfield College

National Quarterfinals; Elite Eight; March 24
Bridgeport	72
Cal State Bakersfield	87
Gannon	69
Morehouse	75
SE Missouri State	90
Kentucky Wesleyan	91*
North Dakota	89
Jacksonville State	64

National semifinals Final Four; March 25
Cal State Bakersfield	85
Morehouse	60
Kentucky Wesleyan	101
North Dakota	92

National championship March 26
Cal State Bakersfield	79
Kentucky Wesleyan	93

- Third Place - North Dakota 98, Morehouse 77

*denotes each overtime played

== All-tournament team ==
- Corey Crowder (Kentucky Wesleyan)
- LeRoy Ellis (Kentucky Wesleyan)
- Wade Green (Cal State Bakersfield)
- Vincent Mitchell (Kentucky Wesleyan)
- Dave Vonesh (North Dakota)

== See also ==
- 1990 NCAA Division I men's basketball tournament
- 1990 NCAA Division III men's basketball tournament
- 1990 NAIA men's basketball tournament
- 1990 NCAA Division II women's basketball tournament
