= 1987 Southland Conference men's basketball tournament =

- Classification: Division I
- Season: 1986–87
- Teams: 6
- First round site: Campus Sites; Campus Arenas
- Finals site: Thomas Assembly Center; Ruston, Louisiana
- Champions: Louisiana Tech (3rd title)
- Winning coach: Tommy Joe Eagles (1st title)
- MVP: Robert Godbolt (Louisiana Tech)

1986–87 Southland Conference men's basketball standings
	Conf.				Overall
Team	W		L	PCT	W		L	PCT
Louisiana Tech †	9	–	1	.900	22	–	8	.733
Arkansas State	5	–	5	.500	21	–	13	.618
McNeese State	5	–	5	.500	14	–	14	.500
Lamar	4	–	6	.400	14	–	15	.483
North Texas State	4	–	6	.400	11	–	17	.393
Northeast Louisiana	3	–	7	.300	13	–	15	.464
UT Arlington		–		–	12	–	18	.400
† 1987 Southland Conference tournament winner Rankings from AP Poll

The 1987 Southland Conference men's basketball tournament was held March 8–10, 1987 with quarterfinal matchups being held at the home arena of the higher seed and the semifinals and championship game played at Thomas Assembly Center in Ruston, Louisiana.

Louisiana Tech defeated Arkansas State in the championship game, 58–51, to win their third Southland men's basketball tournament.

The Bulldogs received a bid to the 1987 NCAA Tournament as No. 14 seed in the Midwest region. They were the only Southland member invited to the NCAA tournament. Conference tournament runner-up Arkansas State received an invitation to the 1987 NIT Tournament.

== Format ==
Six of seven of the conference's members participated in the tournament field. They were seeded based on regular season conference records, with the top two seeds earning byes into the semifinal round. Texas-Arlington did not participate. The other four teams began play in the quarterfinal round.

First round games were played at the home court of the higher-seeded team. All remaining games were played at the Thomas Assembly Center in Ruston, Louisiana.

== Bracket ==
Quarterfinals; Tuesday, March 8
4	Lamar	87
5	North Texas State	82
3	Arkansas State	81
6	NE Louisiana	60

Semifinals; Wednesday, March 9
1	Louisiana Tech	70
4	Lamar	64
3	Arkansas State	60
2	McNeese State	59

Championship; Thursday, March 10
1	Louisiana Tech	58
3	Arkansas State	51
