= Randy White (basketball) =

American basketball player (born 1967)

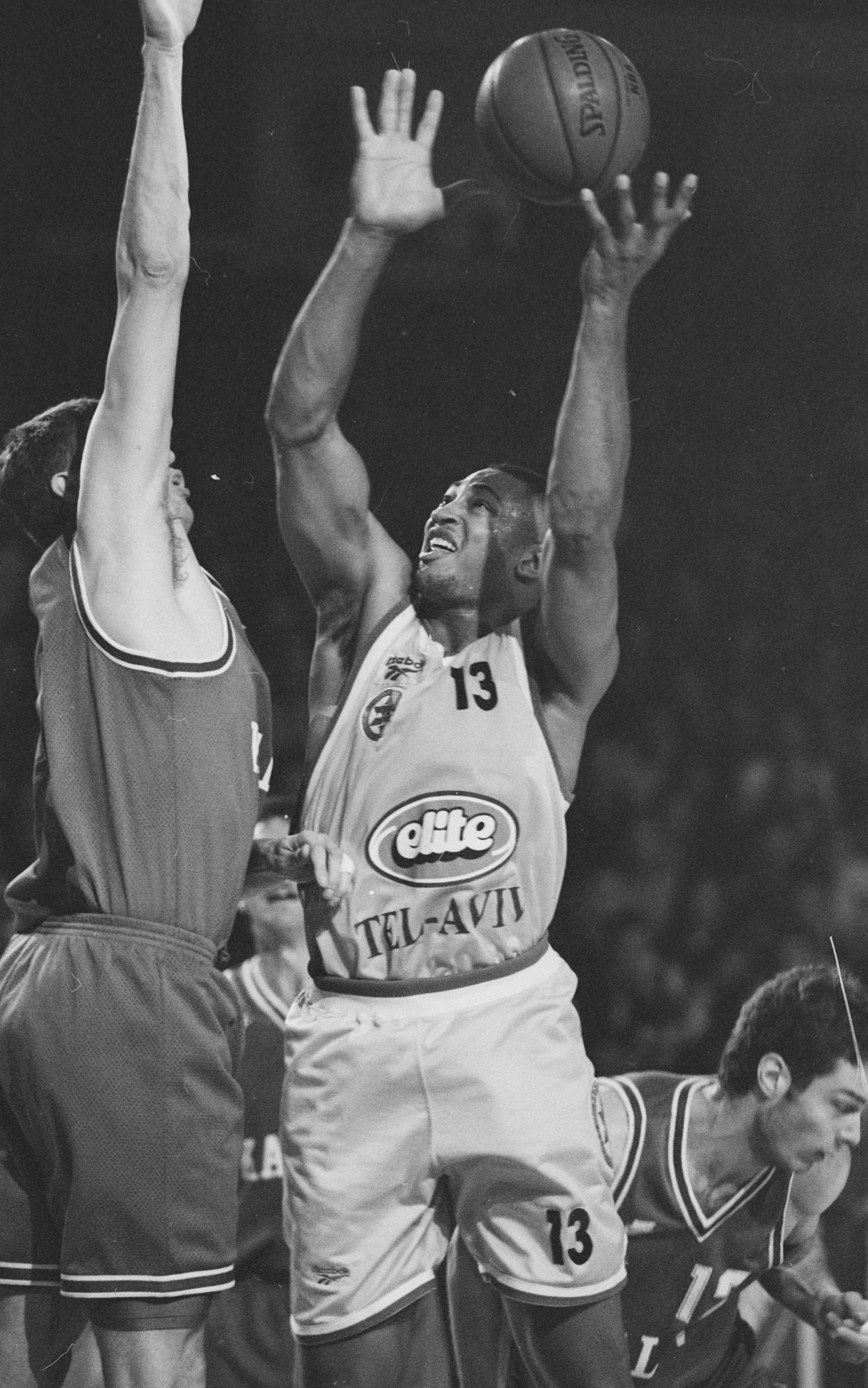
- White with Maccabi Tel Aviv during Haarlem Basketball Week in 1997

Personal information
- Born: November 4, 1967 (age 59) Shreveport, Louisiana, U.S.
- Listed height: 6 ft 8 in (2.03 m)
- Listed weight: 240 lb (109 kg)

Career information
- High school: Huntington (Shreveport, Louisiana)
- College: Louisiana Tech (1985–1989)
- NBA draft: 1989: 1st round, 8th overall pick
- Drafted by: Dallas Mavericks
- Playing career: 1989–1999
- Position: Power forward
- Number: 33, 52

Career history
- 1989–1994: Dallas Mavericks
- 1994: Peristeri
- 1994–1995: Pfizer Reggio Calabria
- 1995–1996: Joventut Badalona
- 1996: Oklahoma City Cavalry
- 1996–1998: Maccabi Tel Aviv
- 1998–1999: CSKA Moscow
- 1999: Aris
- 1999: Near East

Career highlights
- Russian Championship champion (1999); 2× Israeli League champion (1997, 1998); Israeli Cup winner (1998); FIBA EuroStar (1996); American South Player of the Year (1989); 2× First-team All-American South (1988, 1989); Second-team All-Southland (1987)
- Stats at NBA.com
- Stats at Basketball Reference

Randy White (born November 4, 1967) is an American former professional basketball player. During his playing career, at a height of 6 ft 8 in (2.03 m), and a weight of 240 pounds (110 kg), he played at the power forward position. He played college basketball for the Louisiana Tech Bulldogs.

== College career ==
White was a star at Louisiana Tech University, where he averaged 21.2 points and 10.5 rebounds as a senior, and earned the nicknames "Mailman II", and "Mailkid" (a reference to fellow Louisiana Tech alumnus Karl "The Mailman" Malone, who White was often compared to, since they shared many traits).

== Professional career ==
White was then selected by the Dallas Mavericks, with the eighth pick of the 1989 NBA draft, and played five seasons with them, averaging a career-high 9.7 points per game in 1992–93. He later played in the CBA, and in the international leagues, including a stop with European powerhouse Maccabi Tel Aviv, and in Italy with Pfizer Reggio Calabria, in the 1994–1995 season.

== NBA career statistics ==
Legend
GP	Games played	GS	Games started	MPG	Minutes per game
FG%	Field goal percentage	3P%	3-point field goal percentage	FT%	Free throw percentage
RPG	Rebounds per game	APG	Assists per game	SPG	Steals per game
BPG	Blocks per game	PPG	Points per game	**Bold**	Career high

=== Regular season ===
Year	Team	GP	GS	MPG	FG%	3P%	FT%	RPG	APG	SPG	BPG	PPG
1989–90	Dallas	55	2	12.9	.369	.071	.562	3.1	.4	.4	.1	4.3
1990–91	Dallas	**79**	**29**	**24.1**	.398	.162	.707	**6.4**	**.8**	**1.0**	.6	8.8
1991–92	Dallas	65	12	15.7	.380	.148	**.765**	3.6	.5	.5	.3	6.4
1992–93	Dallas	64	20	22.4	**.435**	.238	.750	5.8	**.8**	**1.0**	**.7**	**9.7**
1993–94	Dallas	18	3	17.8	.402	**.300**	.576	4.6	.6	.6	.6	6.4
Career		281	66	19.2	.401	.193	.707	4.9	.6	.7	.4	7.4

=== Playoffs ===
Year	Team	GP	GS	MPG	FG%	3P%	FT%	RPG	APG	SPG	BPG	PPG
1990	Dallas	1	0	2.0	.000	.000	.000	.0	.0	.0	.0	0.0
Career		1	0	2.0	.000	.000	.000	.0	.0	.0	.0	0.0
