= 1990 NAIA men's basketball tournament =

College basketball tournament

- Teams: 32
- Finals site: Kemper Arena; Kansas City, Missouri
- Champions: Birmingham Southern (1 title, 1 title game, 1 Fab Four)
- Runner-up: Wisconsin Eau Claire (2 title game, 2 Fab Four)
- Semifinalists: Georgetown (KY) (4 Final Four); David Lipscomb (2 Final Four)
- Charles Stevenson Hustle Award: Tim Blair (Wisconsin Eau Claire)
- Chuck Taylor MVP: Stacey Butler (Birmingham Southern)

The 1990 NAIA men's basketball tournament was held in March at Kemper Arena in Kansas City, Missouri. The 53rd annual NAIA basketball tournament featured 32 teams playing in a single-elimination format. Birmingham Southern won the championship after a close final (98–96) against Wisconsin Eau Claire.

== Awards and honors ==
- Leading scorers:
- Leading rebounder:
- Player of the Year: est. 1994.

== 1990 NAIA bracket ==
First round	Second round
1	David Lipscomb	92
-	Midland Lutheran (NE)	73
1	David Lipscomb	70
-	Central Arkansas	66'
-	Central Arkansas	62
16	Paul Quinn (TX)	53
TOP TIER
-	Pfeiffer (NC)	97
9	George Fox (OR)	73
-	Pfeiffer	92
-	IUPUI	86
-	IUPUI	87
8	Siena Heights (MI)	80
5	South Carolina Spartanburg	80
-	Geneva (PA)	56
5	South Carolina-Spartanburg	75
12	Grand Canyon (AZ)	69
12	Grand Canyon (AZ)	73
-	Briar Cliff (IA)	66
TOP TIER
-	Southwestern (TX)	65
13	Georgia College	45
-	Southwestern (TX)	67
4	Birmingham Southern (AL)	72
4	Birmingham Southern (AL)	97'
-	Husson (ME)	64
3	Oral Roberts	93
-	The King’s (NY)	79
-	Columbia (MO)	86
3	Oral Roberts	106
-	Columbia (MO)	93
14	Malone (OH)	88
BOTTOM TIER
-	Louisiana College	73
11	Georgetown (KY)	99
11	Georgetown	73
6	Minnesota Duluth	72
6	Minnesota-Duluth	73
-	Hawaii-Pacific	66
7	Central Washington	69
-	Northern State (SD)	45
7	Central Washington	92
10	Alderson Broaddus (WV)	81
10	Alderson-Broaddus (WV)	75
-	Olivet Nazarene (IL)	74
BOTTOM TIER
15	Southern California College	102
-	Washburn (KS)	82
15	Southern California College	59
2	Wisconsin Eau Claire	92
2	Wisconsin Eau Claire	75
-	Philadelphia Pharmacy (PA)	51

Elite Eight
1	David Lipscomb	125
-	Pfeiffer	83
5	South Carolina Spartanburg	80
4	Birmingham Southern	87
3	Oral Roberts (OK)	78
11	Georgetown	80
7	Central Washington	57
2	Wisconsin Eau Claire	84

NAIA national semifinals
1	David Lipscomb	96
4	Birmingham Southern	98
11	Georgetown	65
2	Wisconsin Eau Claire	76

NAIA national championship
4	Birmingham Southern	88
2	Wisconsin Eau Claire	80

- * denotes overtime.

== See also ==
- 1990 NCAA Division I men's basketball tournament
- 1990 NCAA Division II men's basketball tournament
- 1990 NCAA Division III men's basketball tournament
- 1990 NAIA women's basketball tournament
