= 1988 American South Conference men's basketball tournament =

- Classification: Division I
- Season: 1987–88
- Teams: 6
- Finals site: Montagne Center; Beaumont, TX
- Champions: Louisiana Tech (1st title)
- Winning coach: Tommy Joe Eagles (1st title)

1987–88 American South Conference men's basketball standings
	Conf.				Overall
Team	W		L	PCT	W		L	PCT
Louisiana Tech †	7	–	3	.700	22	–	9	.710
New Orleans	7	–	3	.700	21	–	11	.656
Lamar	5	–	5	.500	20	–	11	.645
Arkansas State	4	–	6	.400	21	–	14	.600
Pan American	4	–	6	.400	14	–	14	.500
Southwestern Louisiana	3	–	7	.300	12	–	16	.429
† 1988 American South tournament winner Rankings from AP Poll

The 1988 American South Conference men's basketball tournament was held March 4–6 at the Montagne Center at Lamar University in Beaumont, Texas. This was the inaugural edition of the tournament after the league's establishment in 1987.

Louisiana Tech defeated New Orleans in the championship game, 69–66, to take home the first American South men's basketball tournament.

The Bulldogs, however, did not receive an automatic invitation to the 1988 NCAA Tournament. They ultimately participated in the 1988 NIT.

== Format ==
All six of the conference's founding members participated in the tournament field. They were seeded based on regular season conference records. The top two teams were given byes into the semifinals while the bottom four teams were placed and paired into the initial quarterfinal round.

All games were played at Lamar's home court at the Montagne Center in Beaumont, Texas.

== Bracket ==
Quarterfinals; Friday, March 4
5	Pan American	62
4	Arkansas State	67
3	Lamar	76
6	Southwestern Louisiana	75

Semifinals; Saturday, March 5
1	Louisiana Tech	63
4	Arkansas State	61
3	Lamar	59
2	New Orleans	75

Championship; Sunday, March 6
1	Louisiana Tech	69
2	New Orleans	66
