= Cecil Crowley =

American basketball coach (1908–1991)

Biographical details
- Born: August 31, 1908; Corsicana, Texas, U.S.
- Died: July 31, 1991 (aged 82)

Coaching career (HC unless noted)

Football
- 1931–1935: Haynesville HS (assistant)
- 1936–1938: Haynesville HS (football)
- 1939: Louisville Male HS
- 1940–1941: Louisiana Tech (line)
- 1945–1956: Louisiana Tech (line)

Basketball
- 1940–1942: Louisiana Tech
- 1945–1964: Louisiana Tech

Head coaching record
- Overall: 270–221

Accomplishments and honors

Awards
- Louisiana Basketball Hall of Fame; Louisiana Tech Athletic Hall of Fame (1985)

Cecil Charles Crowley (August 31, 1908 – July 31, 1991) was an American college basketball coach. He was the head coach of the Louisiana Tech Bulldogs basketball program from 1940 to 1942 and 1945–1964. Crowley was a native of Corsicana, Texas and a graduate of North Dallas High School. He played football and basketball at Centenary College of Louisiana. In 1931, he began his coaching career as an assistant football coach at Haynesville High School.

Among players coached at Louisiana Tech by Crowley were Jackie Moreland and Ray Germany.

== Career ==
Cecil Charles Crowley was born on August 31, 1908, in Corsicana, Texas. Crowley attended North Dallas High School and played football and basketball at Centenary College of Louisiana.

== Head coaching record ==
Record table
Season	Team	Overall	Conference	Standing	Postseason
Louisiana Tech Bulldogs (Louisiana Intercollegiate Conference) (1940–1942)
1940–41	Louisiana Tech	7–10	7–7		
1941–42	Louisiana Tech	13–8	7–1	1st	
Louisiana Tech Bulldogs (Louisiana Intercollegiate Conference) (1945–1948)
1945–46	Louisiana Tech	16–8	9–1	1st	
1946–47	Louisiana Tech	12–6	6–2	T–1st	
1947–48	Louisiana Tech	14–10	7–1	T–1st	
Louisiana Tech Bulldogs (Gulf States Conference) (1948–1964)
1948–49	Louisiana Tech	11–11	8–8		
1949–50	Louisiana Tech	11–9	8–8		
1950–51	Louisiana Tech	11–10	6–10		
1951–52	Louisiana Tech	–	–		
1952–53	Louisiana Tech	–	–	1st	
1953–54	Louisiana Tech	–	–		
1954–55	Louisiana Tech	–	–	T–1st	
1955–56	Louisiana Tech	–	–		
1956–57	Louisiana Tech	–	–		
1957–58	Louisiana Tech	–	–		
1958–59	Louisiana Tech	–	–	1st	
1959–60	Louisiana Tech	–	–		
1960–61	Louisiana Tech	–	–		
1961–62	Louisiana Tech	–	–		
1962–63	Louisiana Tech	–	–		
1963–64	Louisiana Tech	–	–	T–1st	
Louisiana Tech:		–	–		
Total:		270–221			
National champion Postseason invitational champion Conference regular season champion Conference regular season and conference tournament champion Division regular season champion Division regular season and conference tournament champion Conference tournament champion
