= 1989 American South Conference men's basketball tournament =

- Classification: Division I
- Season: 1988–89
- Teams: 6
- Finals site: Cajundome; Lafayette, LA
- Champions: Louisiana Tech (2nd title)
- Winning coach: Tommy Joe Eagles (2nd title)

1988–89 American South Conference men's basketball standings
| | Conf. | | | | Overall |
| Team | W | | L | PCT | W | | L | PCT |
|---|---|---|---|---|---|---|---|---|
| New Orleans | 7 | – | 3 | .700 | 19 | – | 11 | .633 |
| Louisiana Tech † | 6 | – | 4 | .600 | 23 | – | 9 | .719 |
| Arkansas State | 6 | – | 4 | .600 | 20 | – | 10 | .667 |
| Southwestern Louisiana | 4 | – | 6 | .400 | 17 | – | 12 | .586 |
| Pan American | 4 | – | 6 | .400 | 15 | – | 13 | .536 |
| Lamar | 3 | – | 7 | .300 | 12 | – | 16 | .429 |
† 1989 American South tournament winner Rankings from AP Poll

The 1989 American South Conference men's basketball tournament was held March 4–6 at the Cajundome at University of Southwestern Louisiana in Lafayette, Louisiana.

Louisiana Tech defeated New Orleans in the championship game, 84–62, to take home their second American South men's basketball tournament title.

Louisiana Tech received an at-large invitation to the 1989 NCAA Tournament as the #9 seed in the Southeast region because the American South was not eligible for an automatic bid at the time. The Bulldogs defeated La Salle 83–74 before losing to #1 seed Oklahoma 124–81.

== Format ==
All six of the conference's founding members participated in the tournament field. They were seeded based on regular season conference records. The top two teams were given byes into the semifinals while the bottom four teams were placed and paired into the initial quarterfinal round.

All games were played at the Cajundome in Lafayette, Louisiana.

== Bracket ==
Quarterfinals; Friday, March 3
5 | Pan American | 87
4 | Southwestern Louisiana | 93
3 | Louisiana Tech | 103
6 | Lamar | 80

Semifinals; Saturday, March 4
1 | New Orleans | 89
4 | Southwestern Louisiana | 73
3 | Louisiana Tech | 82
2 | Arkansas State | 65

Championship; Sunday, March 5
1 | New Orleans | 62
3 | Louisiana Tech | 84
