= Emmett Hendricks =

American basketball player & coach (1938–2003)

Biographical details
- Born: February 14, 1938
- Died: May 18, 2003 (aged 65); Natchitoches, Louisiana, U.S.

Playing career
- 1961–1965: Northwestern State
- Position: Guard

Coaching career (HC unless noted)
- 1972–1974: Louisiana Tech (asst.)
- 1974–1977: Louisiana Tech

Head coaching record
- Overall: 40–37 (.519)

Accomplishments and honors

Championships
- Southland Regular Season Champion (1976)

Awards
- 2x Southland Coach of the Year (1975, 1976)

Emmett Gene Hendricks (February 14, 1938 – May 18, 2003) was an American college basketball coach. He was the head coach of the Louisiana Tech Bulldogs basketball program from 1974 to 1977. In 2003, Hendricks died at the age of 65 after a lengthy illness.

== Early life and education ==
Hendricks graduated from Marthaville High School, where he participated in basketball, baseball and track. After graduation from high school, he served in the United States Air Force for four years as a radar technician. He graduated from Northwestern State University in 1965, where he played basketball for four years.

== Coaching career ==
Hendricks began coaching high school basketball throughout Louisiana, at Negreet, Marthaville, North Caddo – where he won district 1-AA coach of the year honours for the 1968–69 season – and Lake Charles, before moving up to the college ranks as a graduate assistant at North Texas State University. He joined Louisiana Tech in 1972 as an assistant to Scotty Robertson. After two seasons, he was promoted to head coach following Robertson's departure to the NBA's New Orleans Jazz.

=== Head coaching record ===
Record table
Season	Team	Overall	Conference	Standing	Postseason
Louisiana Tech Bulldogs (Southland Conference) (1974–1977)
1974–75	Louisiana Tech	12–13	5–3	2nd	
1975–76	Louisiana Tech	15–11	9–1	1st	
1976–77	Louisiana Tech	13–13	4–6	T–4th	
Louisiana Tech:		40–37 (.519)	18–10 (.643)		
Total:		40–37 (.519)			
National champion Postseason invitational champion Conference regular season champion Conference regular season and conference tournament champion Division regular season champion Division regular season and conference tournament champion Conference tournament champion

== Personal life ==
Hendricks was married to Rita (née Wright) of Negreet, Louisiana, a former all-state high school basketball player. They had a son, Casey.

He was co-owner of a Mexican restaurant in Natchitoches, Louisiana. He died in 2003 after a long battle with cancer.
