= 1990 National Invitation Tournament =

Annual NCAA college basketball competition

- Season: 1989–90
- Teams: 32
- Finals site: Madison Square Garden, New York City
- Champions: Vanderbilt Commodores (1st title)
- Runner-up: Saint Louis Billikens (4th title game)
- Semifinalists: Penn State Nittany Lions (1st semifinal); New Mexico Lobos (2nd semifinal)
- Winning coach: Eddie Fogler (1st title)
- MVP: Scott Draud (Vanderbilt)

The 1990 National Invitation Tournament was the 1990 edition of the annual NCAA college basketball competition. This tournament adopted the tenths-second game clock in the final minute of every period when played in NBA arenas, unlike whole seconds as in past years.

== Selected teams ==
Below is a list of the 32 teams selected for the tournament.

- Arizona State
- Baylor
- Bowling Green
- Cincinnati
- Creighton
- DePaul
- Fordham
- Hawaii
- Holy Cross
- James Madison
- Kent State
- Long Beach State
- Louisiana Tech
- Marquette
- Maryland
- Massachusetts
- Memphis
- Mississippi State
- New Mexico
- New Orleans
- Oklahoma State
- Oregon
- Penn State
- Rutgers
- Saint Louis
- Southern
- Southern Illinois
- Stanford
- Tennessee
- Tulsa
- Vanderbilt
- Wisconsin–Green Bay

== Bracket ==
Below are the four first round brackets, along with the four-team championship bracket.

First Round
Maryland	91
Massachusetts	81
Penn State	57
Marquette	54
Rutgers	87
Holy Cross	78
Fordham	106
Southern	80

Second Round
Maryland	78
Penn State	80
Rutgers	81
Fordham	74

Quarterfinals
Penn State	58
Rutgers	55

First Round
Mississippi State	84
Baylor	75
New Orleans	78
James Madison	74
Vanderbilt	98
Louisiana Tech	90
Tennessee	73
Memphis	71

Second Round
Mississippi State	60
New Orleans	65
Vanderbilt	89
Tennessee	85

Quarterfinals
New Orleans	85
Vanderbilt	88

First Round
DePaul	89
Creighton	72
Cincinnati	75
Bowling Green	60
Saint Louis	85
Kent State	74
Wisconsin–Green Bay	73
Southern Illinois	60

Second Round
DePaul	61
Cincinnati	59
Saint Louis	'58
Wisconsin–Green Bay	54

Quarterfinals
DePaul	47
Saint Louis	54

First Round
Hawaii	69
Stanford	57
Long Beach State	86
Arizona State	71
Oklahoma State	83
Tulsa	74
New Mexico	89
Oregon	78

Second Round
Hawaii	'84
Long Beach State	79
Oklahoma State	88
New Mexico	90

Quarterfinals
Hawaii	58
New Mexico	80

=== Semifinals & finals ===
Semifinals
Penn State	62
Vanderbilt	75
Saint Louis	80
New Mexico	73

Finals
Vanderbilt	74
Saint Louis	72

Third place game
Penn State	83
New Mexico	81

== See also ==
- 1990 National Women's Invitational Tournament
- 1990 NCAA Division I men's basketball tournament
- 1990 NCAA Division II men's basketball tournament
- 1990 NCAA Division III men's basketball tournament
- 1990 NCAA Division I women's basketball tournament
- 1990 NCAA Division II women's basketball tournament
- 1990 NCAA Division III women's basketball tournament
- 1990 NAIA Division I men's basketball tournament
- 1990 NAIA Division I women's basketball tournament
