= Louisiana Tech Bulldogs basketball =

Men's basketball program at Louisiana Tech University

Louisiana Tech Bulldogs
2026–27 Louisiana Tech Bulldogs basketball team
- University: Louisiana Tech University
- First season: 1909–10; 117 years ago
- Head coach: Talvin Hester (5th season)
- Location: Ruston, Louisiana
- Arena: Thomas Assembly Center (capacity: 8,000)
- Conference: Sun Belt
- Nickname: Dunkin' Dogs
- Colors: Blue and red
- Student section: The Kennel
- All-time record: 1,494–1,096 (.577)

NCAA Division I tournament Sweet Sixteen
- 1967*, 1985

NCAA Division I tournament appearances
- 1967*, 1971*, 1984, 1985, 1987, 1989, 1991

Conference tournament champions
- Southland: 1984, 1985, 1987; American South: 1988, 1989, 1991

Conference regular-season champions
- LSIAA: 1910; SIAA: 1927, 1928, 1934; Louisiana Intercollegiate: 1942, 1946, 1947, 1948; Gulf States: 1953, 1955, 1959, 1964, 1967, 1970, 1971; Southland: 1976, 1985, 1987; American South: 1988, 1990; Sun Belt: 1992, 1999; WAC: 2013; C-USA: 2014, 2015

Conference division champions
- 2021

Uniforms
Home	Away
Alternate	Alternate
- * at Division II level

The Louisiana Tech Bulldogs basketball program, nicknamed the Dunkin' Dogs, represents intercollegiate men's basketball at Louisiana Tech University. The program competes in the Sun Belt Conference in Division I of the National Collegiate Athletic Association (NCAA) and plays home games at the Thomas Assembly Center in Ruston, Louisiana. Talvin Hester is in his fourth season as the Bulldogs' head coach. The Bulldogs have appeared five times in the NCAA tournament, most recently in 1991.

== History ==
=== Conference affiliations ===
- 1925–1939: Southern Intercollegiate Athletic Association
- 1939–1948: Louisiana Intercollegiate Conference
- 1948–1971: Gulf States Conference
- 1971–1987: Southland Conference
- 1987–1991: American South Conference
- 1991–2001: Sun Belt Conference
- 2001–2013: Western Athletic Conference
- 2013–2026: Conference USA
- 2026–present: Sun Belt Conference

=== Championships ===
==== Conference regular season championships ====
Season	Conference	Record	Head coach
1909–10	Louisiana State Intercollegiate Athletic Association	N/A	Percy S. Prince
1926–27	Southern Intercollegiate Athletic Association	N/A	Robert S. Wynn
1927–28	Southern Intercollegiate Athletic Association	N/A	Robert S. Wynn
1933–34	Southern Intercollegiate Athletic Association	N/A	Hal Lee
1941–42	Louisiana Intercollegiate Conference	N/A	Cecil Crowley
1945–46	Louisiana Intercollegiate Conference	N/A	Cecil Crowley
1946–47	Louisiana Intercollegiate Conference	N/A	Cecil Crowley
1947–48	Louisiana Intercollegiate Conference	N/A	Cecil Crowley
1952–53	Gulf States Conference	N/A	Cecil Crowley
1954–55	Gulf States Conference	N/A	Cecil Crowley
1958–59	Gulf States Conference	N/A	Cecil Crowley
1963–64	Gulf States Conference	N/A	Cecil Crowley
1966–67	Gulf States Conference	11–1	Scotty Robertson
1969–70	Gulf States Conference	9–3	Scotty Robertson
1970–71	Gulf States Conference	10–0	Scotty Robertson
1975–76	Southland Conference	9–1	Emmett Hendricks
1984–85	Southland Conference	11–1	Andy Russo
1986–87	Southland Conference	9–1	Tommy Joe Eagles
1987–88	American South Conference	7–3	Tommy Joe Eagles
1989–90	American South Conference	8–2	Jerry Loyd
1991–92	Sun Belt Conference	13–3	Jerry Loyd
1998–99	Sun Belt Conference	10–4	Keith Richard
2012–13	Western Athletic Conference	16–2	Michael White
2013–14	Conference USA	13–3	Michael White
2014–15	Conference USA	15–3	Michael White
2020–21	Conference USA (West)	12–4	Eric Konkol

==== Conference tournament championships ====
Year	Conference	Champion	Score	Runner-up	Most Valuable Player	Site
1984	Southland	Louisiana Tech	68–65	Lamar	Willie Simmons	Beaumont Civic Center; Beaumont, Texas
1985	Southland	Louisiana Tech	70–69	Lamar	Jerry Everett	Thomas Assembly Center; Ruston, Louisiana
1987	Southland	Louisiana Tech	58–51	Arkansas State	Robert Godbolt	Thomas Assembly Center; Ruston, Louisiana
1988	American South	Louisiana Tech	69–66	New Orleans		Montagne Center; Beaumont, Texas
1989	American South	Louisiana Tech	84–62	New Orleans		Cajundome; Lafayette, Louisiana
1991	American South	Louisiana Tech	61–56	New Orleans		Lakefront Arena; New Orleans, Louisiana

=== Postseason ===
==== NCAA Division I Tournament results ====
The Bulldogs have appeared in the NCAA Division I tournament five times. Their combined record is 4–5.

Year	Seed	Round	Opponent	Result
1984	#10	Round of 48; Round of 32	#7 Fresno State #2 Houston	W 66–56; L 69–77
1985	#5	Round of 64; Round of 32; Sweet Sixteen	#12 Pittsburgh #4 Ohio State #1 Oklahoma	W 78–54; W 79–67; L 84–86
1987	#14	Round of 64	#3 DePaul	L 62–76
1989	#9	Round of 64; Round of 32	#8 La Salle #1 Oklahoma	W 83–74; L 81–124
1991	#12	Round of 64	#5 Wake Forest	L 65–71

==== NCAA Division II Tournament results ====
The Bulldogs have appeared in the NCAA Division II tournament two times. Their combined record is 2–2.

Year	Round	Opponent	Result
1967	Regional semifinals Regional Final	North Dakota; Illinois State	W 86–77; L 66–89
1971	Regional semifinals Regional Third Place	Tennessee State; New Orleans	L 90–91; W 107–88

==== NIT results ====
Louisiana Tech has appeared in ten National Invitation Tournaments. Their combined record is 15–10.

Year	Round	Opponent	Result
1986	First round Second Round; Quarterfinals; Semifinals; Third Place	Northern Arizona; McNeese State; Providence; Ohio State; Florida	W 67–61; W 77–61; W 64–63; L 66–79; W 67–62
1988	First round Second Round	Arkansas–Little Rock; Connecticut	W 66–56; L 59–65
1990	First round	Vanderbilt	L 90–98^{OT}
1992	First round	New Mexico	L 84–90
2002	Opening Round; First round Second Round	Louisiana–Lafayette; Vanderbilt; Villanova	W 83–63; W 83–68; L 64–67
2006	First round	Clemson	L 53–69
2013	First round Second Round	Florida State; Southern Miss	W 71–66; L 52–63
2014	First round Second Round; Quarterfinals	Iona; Georgia; Florida State	W 89–88; W 79–71; L 75–78
2015	First round Second Round; Quarterfinals	Central Michigan; Texas A&M; Temple	W 89–79; W 84–72; L 59–77
2021	First round Quarterfinals; Semifinals; Third Place	Ole Miss; Western Kentucky; Mississippi State; Colorado State	W 70–61; W 72–65; L 62–84; W 76–74

==== Vegas 16 results ====
The Bulldogs have appeared in one Vegas 16. Their record is 0–1.

Year	Round	Opponent	Result
2016	Quarterfinals	East Tennessee State	L 83–88

==== CIT results ====
Louisiana Tech has appeared in one CollegeInsider.com Tournament. Their combined record is 1–1.

Year	Round	Opponent	Result
2010	First round Quarterfinals	Southern Miss; Missouri State	W 66–57; L 40–69

==== NAIA tournament results ====
The Bulldogs have appeared in the NAIA tournament four times. Their combined record is 1–4.

Year	Round	Opponent	Result
1942	First round	Texas Tech	L 47–59
1946	First round	Eastern Washington State	L 44–66
1953	First round	Hamline	L 80–89
1955	First round Second Round	Coe; Steubenville	W 94–65; L 65–90

== Home venues ==
=== Men's Gymnasium (1925-1952) ===
The Men's Gymnasium was located on Mayfield Avenue, directly north of the northwest corner of Hale Hall and across the street from the eventual site of Memorial Gymnasium. It was located north of the original Tech Stadium football field, and was demolished around 1984 to create more parking adjacent to Hale Hall.

=== Memorial Gymnasium (1952–1982) ===
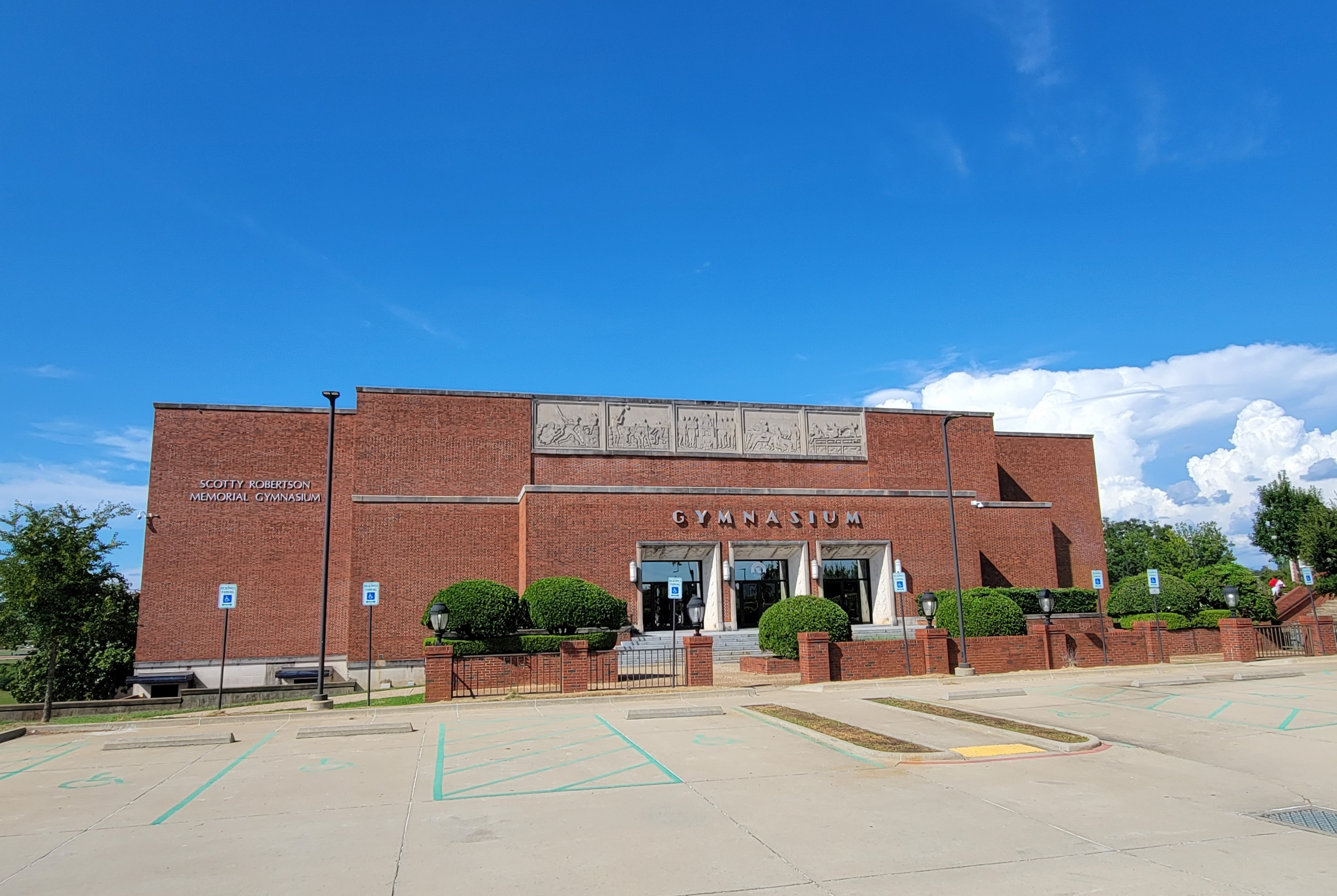
Memorial Gymnasium

In 1952, Memorial Gymnasium was a 4,800-seat gymnasium constructed on the Louisiana Tech University campus in Ruston to serve as the home of the Louisiana Tech Bulldogs basketball team. Today Memorial Gym serves as a practice facility for the basketball team.

=== Thomas Assembly Center (1982–present) ===
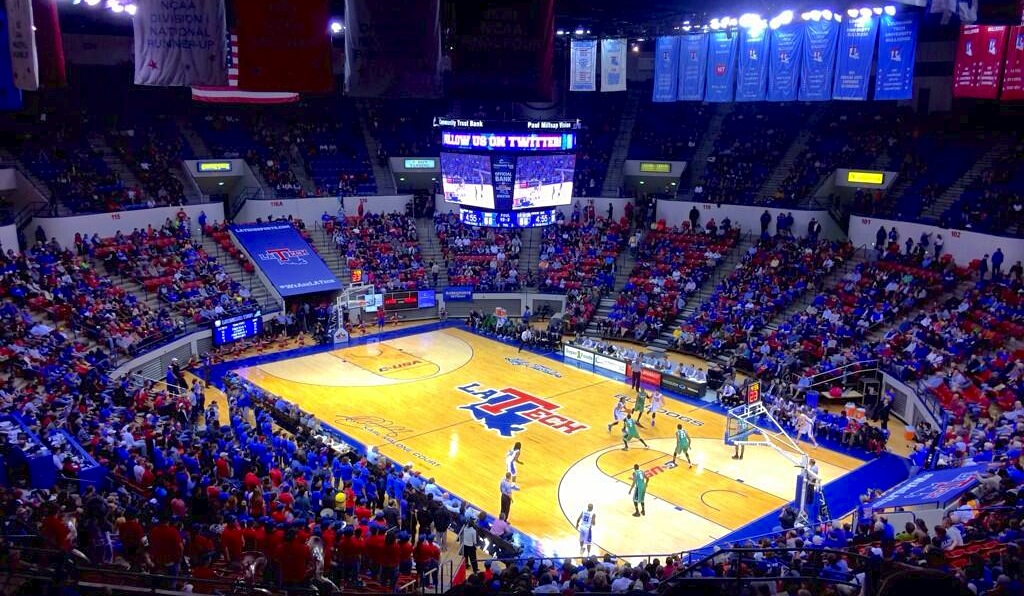
Thomas Assembly Center

The Thomas Assembly Center is an 8,000-seat multi-purpose arena in Ruston, Louisiana. The arena, named for its benefactor and businessman Samuel M. Thomas, is home to the Division I NCAA Louisiana Tech University Bulldogs men's basketball team.

== Traditions ==
=== Dunkin' Dogs ===
The Dunkin' Dogs nickname emerged during the 1982–83 season led by Karl Malone and Willie Simmons making highlight reel dunks. The tradition has continued through time as the current Dunkin' Dogs led by Raheem Appleby, Michale Kyser, and Alex Hamilton have made several dunks featured nationally on ESPN's SportsCenter Top Plays and Fox Sports Live's The 1.

=== Hoop Troop ===
Hoop Troop is the official basketball pep band at Louisiana Tech University. The Hoop Troop performs at most men's basketball home games and travels to select road basketball games. The band also usually travels to all post-season games played by the Bulldogs, and is known nationally as one of the best basketball bands in college basketball. In the 2005 post-season, the Hoop Troop was featured in a Sports Illustrated's College Edition article, "65 Things We Want to See During March Madness" in which states, "30) The Louisiana Tech pep band, a.k.a. the Hoop Troop, the funniest band in the land." The Hoop Troop was the only basketball band to be listed.

== Players ==
=== Basketball Hall of Fame ===
- Leon Barmore, 2003
- Karl Malone, 2010

=== Retired numbers ===
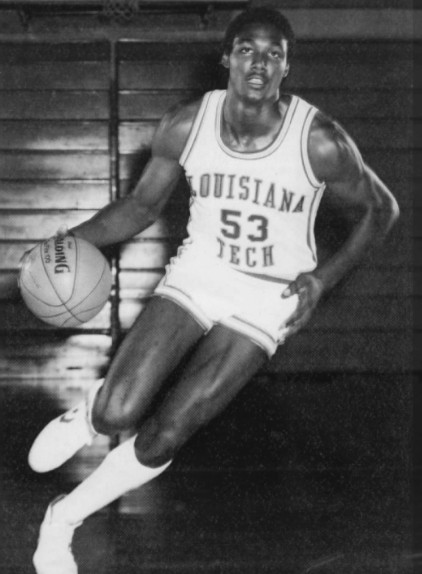
Karl Malone, whose no. 32 was retired by Louisiana

No.	Player	Tenure	Ref.
12	Leon Barmore	1965–1967	
24	Paul Millsap	2003–2006	
32	Karl Malone	1982–1985	
44	Jackie Moreland	1957–1960	

=== All-Americans ===
- Jackie Moreland – 1958, 1959, 1960
- Ray Germany – 1959, 1960
- Mike Green – 1971, 1972, 1973
- Mike McConathy – 1976
- Karl Malone – 1983, 1984, 1985
- Randy White – 1989

=== Conference Player of the Year ===
- Jackie Moreland – 1960
- Mike Green – 1973
- Mike McConathy – 1976
- Karl Malone – 1983
- Randy White – 1988, 1989
- Ron Ellis – 1992
- Gerrod Henderson – 2000
- Speedy Smith – 2015
- Alex Hamilton – 2016

Conference Freshman of the Year

- Antonio Meeking - 2000 (Sun Belt)
- Paul Millsap - 2004 (WAC)
- Raheem Appleby - 2012 (WAC)
- DaQuan Bracey - 2017 (C-USA)
- Kenneth Lofton, Jr. - 2021 (C-USA)

=== Leading scorers ===
Rank	Player	Years played	Points
1	Mike Green	1969–1973	2,340
2	Mike McConathy	1973–1977	2,033
3	Alex Hamilton	2012–2016	1,986
4	Randy White	1985–1989	1,947
5	Anthony Dade	1988–1992	1,867
6	Gerrod Henderson	1998–2002	1,829
7	Raheem Appleby	2011–2015	1,770
8	Karl Malone	1982–1985	1,716
9	Paul Millsap	2003–2006	1,708
10	Kyle Gibson	2006–2010	1,677

=== NBA draftees ===
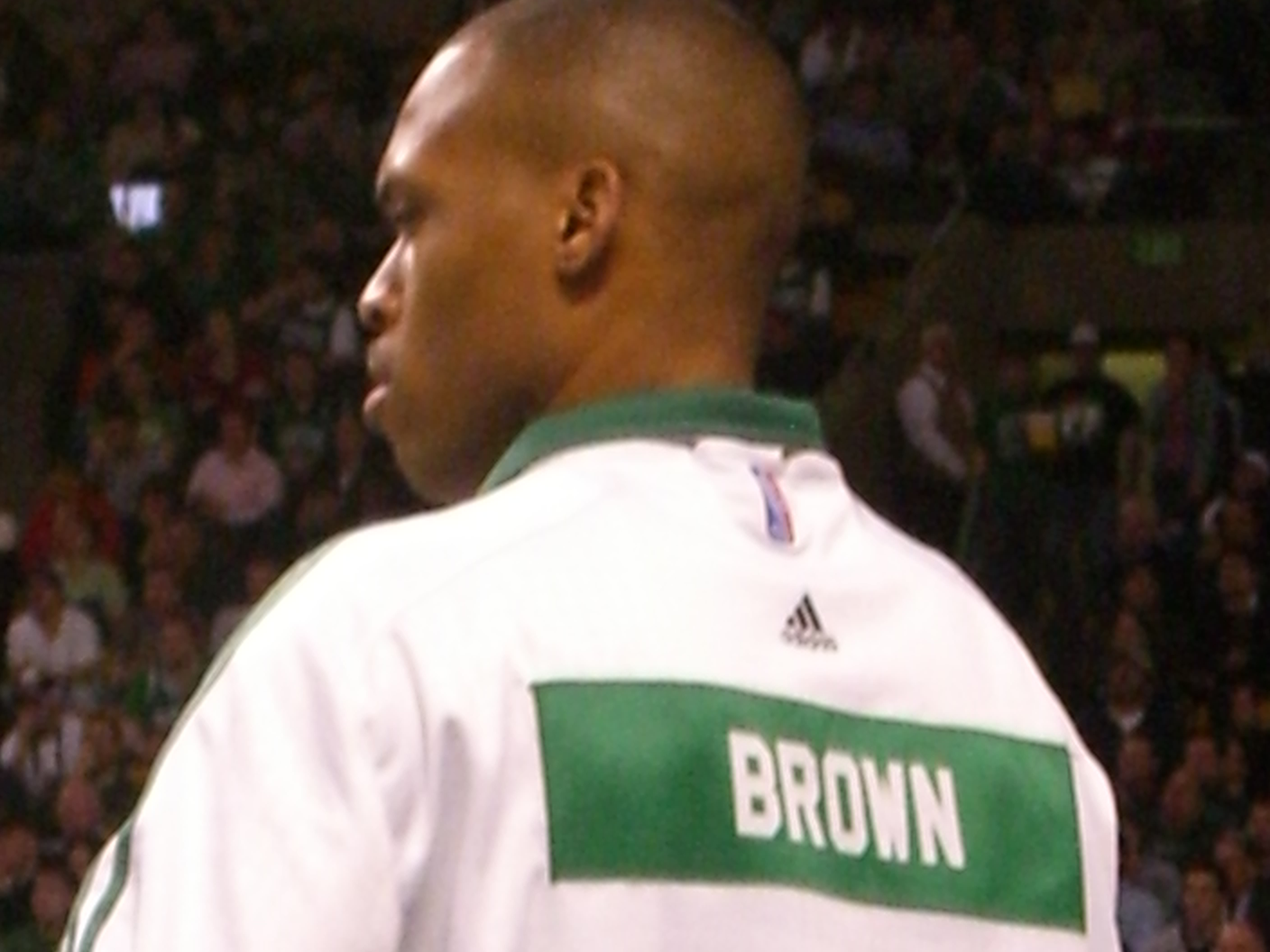
P. J. Brown

The Bulldogs have had 14 players selected in the NBA draft, including 4 first round picks. Twice the Bulldogs have had multiple players taken in the same draft year (1985 and 1992).

Year	Round	Pick	Overall pick	Player	NBA club
1960	1	4	4	Jackie Moreland	Detroit Pistons
1967	15	10	148	Rich Peek	Baltimore Bullets
1970	6	5	90	Charlie Bishop	Cincinnati Royals
1973	1	4	4	Mike Green	Seattle SuperSonics
1977	4	13	79	Mike McConathy	Chicago Bulls
1979	2	17	39	Victor King	Los Angeles Lakers
1984	6	19	135	Rennie Bailey	Detroit Pistons
1985	4	6	76	Willie Simmons	Sacramento Kings
1985	1	13	13	Karl Malone	Utah Jazz
1989	1	8	8	Randy White	Dallas Mavericks
1992	2	22	49	Ron Ellis	Phoenix Suns
1992	2	2	29	P. J. Brown	New Jersey Nets
2004	2	17	47	Paul Millsap	Utah Jazz
2010	2	21	51	Magnum Rolle	Oklahoma City Thunder
2020	2	29	59	Jalen Harris	Toronto Raptors

=== Other Bulldogs in the NBA ===
- Erik McCree - Utah Jazz
- Kenneth Lofton Jr. – Memphis Grizzlies

=== Other Bulldogs overseas ===
- Kyle Gibson (born 1987) - Hapoel Galil Elyon of the Israeli Basketball Premier League
- Alex Hamilton (born 1993) - Hapoel Eilat in the Israeli Basketball Premier League
- Michale Kyser (born 1991) - Hapoel Holon in the Israeli Basketball Premier League
- Kenneth Lofton Jr. (born 2002) - Hapoel Jerusalem in the Israeli Basketball Premier League

== Coaches ==
=== Head coaches ===
Coach	Years	Seasons	Games	Win	Loss	Pct.	Notes
Percy S. Prince	1909–1911	2	9	5	4	.556	LSIAA regular season champions (1910)
Ralph C. Kenney	1925–1926	1	14	7	7	.500	
Robert S. Wynn	1926–1931	5	116	61	55	.526	SIAA regular season champions (1927, 1928)
Hal Lee	1931–1934	3	43	24	19	.558	
Eddie McLane	1934–1936	2	38	26	12	.684	SIAA regular season champions (1934)
Herb Duggins	1936–1940	4	73	27	46	.370	
Cecil Crowley	1940–1942, 1945–1964	21	490	269	221	.549	Gulf States Coach of the Year (1953, 1955, 1964); Gulf States regular season champions (1953, 1955); Louisiana Intercollegiate regular season champions (1942, 1946, 1947, 1948)
Joe Aillet	1944–1945	1	17	5	12	.294	
Scotty Robertson	1964–1974	10	247	161	86	.652	Gulf States Coach of the Year (1967, 1971); Gulf States regular season champions (1964, 1967, 1970, 1971)
Emmett Hendricks	1974–1977	3	77	40	37	.519	Southland Coach of the Year (1975, 1976)
J.D. Barnett	1977–1979	2	52	23	29	.442	Southland Coach of the Year (1979)
Andy Russo	1979–1985	6	177	122	55	.689	Southland Coach of the Year (1983, 1985)
Tommy Joe Eagles	1985–1989	4	127	87	40	.685	Southland Coach of the Year (1987, 1988)
Jerry Loyd	1989–1994	5	145	73	72	.503	American South regular season champions (1988, 1990); Sun Belt regular season champions (1992)
Jim Wooldridge	1994–1998	4	111	52	59	.468	
Keith Richard	1998–2007	9	267	150	117	.562	Sun Belt Coach of the Year (1999); Sun Belt regular season champions (1999)
Kerry Rupp	2007–2011	4	130	57	73	.438	
Michael White	2011–2015	4	141	101	40	.716	C-USA Coach of the Year (2013, 2015); C-USA regular season champions (2014, 2015); WAC regular season champions (2013)
Eric Konkol	2015–2022	7	228	153	75	.671	C-USA Coach of the Year (2021); C-USA Conference Division Season Champions (2021)
Talvin Hester	2022–Present	3	97	57	40	.588	
Total		99	2,565	1,476	1,089	.575	
1942–1943, 1943–1944: Basketball discontinued due to World War II

=== Bulldogs in coaching ===
- Kyle Keller – Stephen F. Austin

== See also ==
- Louisiana Tech Lady Techsters basketball
- List of NCAA Division I men's basketball programs
