= American South Conference =

American college sports conference, 1987–1991

- Association: NCAA
- Founded: 1987
- Folded: 1991
- Commissioner: Craig Thompson
- Division: Division I
- No. of teams: 7
- Headquarters: Metairie, Louisiana

Locations
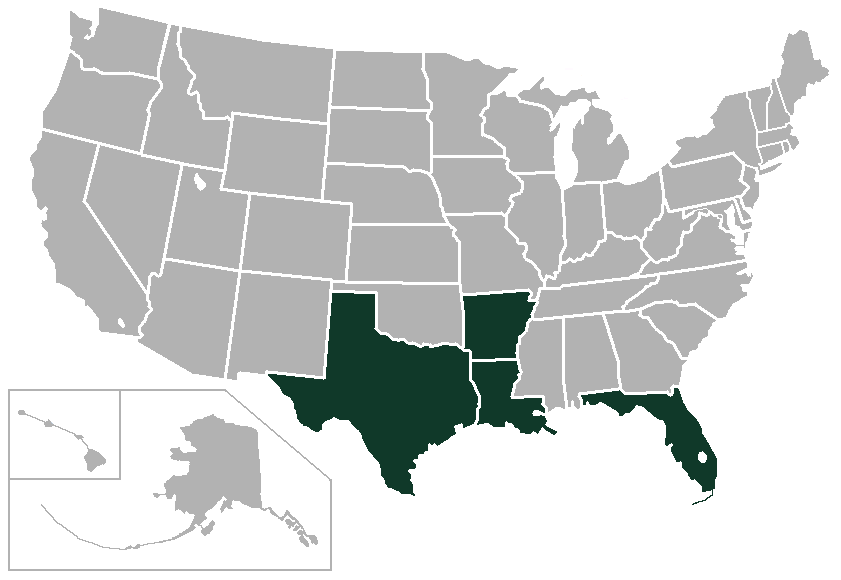

The American South Conference was an NCAA Division I athletic conference that existed from 1987–88 to 1990–91. The charter members were Arkansas State University, Lamar University, Louisiana Tech University, the University of New Orleans, the University of Southwestern Louisiana (now known as the University of Louisiana at Lafayette) and the University of Texas–Pan American (now merged into the University of Texas Rio Grande Valley). The University of Central Florida (UCF) became the only expansion school during the conference's final academic season before the conference merged with the Sun Belt Conference. The Sun Belt, which was losing all but three members, merged with the American South conference. The combined conference retained the name of the older Sun Belt Conference. Craig Thompson, the American South's first and only commissioner, became commissioner of the merged Sun Belt. After serving as Sun Belt commissioner for eight years, he became commissioner of the newly formed Mountain West Conference in 1998.

In its brief existence, the American South was home to the 1988 NCAA Division I Women's Basketball Champion in Louisiana Tech, and also had two men's basketball teams earn NCAA at-large berths, Louisiana Tech in 1989 (defeated LaSalle in NCAA 1st Round) and New Orleans in 1991. Lamar's women's basketball team advanced to the NCAA round of eight in 1991 defeating Texas, LSU, and Arkansas before losing to tournament finalist Virginia.

== Member schools ==
=== Final members ===
Institution	Nickname	Location	Founded	Affiliation	Joined (Note: Represents the calendar year when fall sports competition begins.)	Left (Note: Represents the calendar year when spring sports competition ends.)	Subsequent conference(s)	Current conference
Arkansas State University	Red Wolves	Jonesboro, Arkansas	1909	Public	1987	1991	Sun Belt (SBC) (1991–present)	
University of Central Florida	Knights	Orlando, Florida	1963	Public	1990	1991	various (Note: Central Florida (now UCF) had joined the following subsequent conferences: the Sun Belt Conference (SBC) during the 1991–92 school year; the Atlantic Sun Conference (A-Sun) from 1992–93 to 2004–05; Conference USA (C-USA) from 2005–06 to 2012–13; and the American Athletic Conference (AAC) from 2013–14 to 2022–23.)	Big 12 (2023–present)
Lamar University	Cardinals	Beaumont, Texas	1923	Public	1987	1991	Sun Belt (SBC) (1991–98); Western (WAC) (2021–22)	Southland (SLC) (1998–2021; 2022–present)
Louisiana Tech University	Bulldogs & Lady Techsters	Ruston, Louisiana	1894	Public	1987	1991	Sun Belt (SBC) (1991–2001); Western (WAC) (2001–13)	Conf. USA (C-USA) (2013–present) (Sun Belt (SBC) in 2026)
University of New Orleans	Privateers	New Orleans, Louisiana	1958	Public	1987	1991	Sun Belt (SBC) (1991–2010); D-I Independent (Note: New Orleans was transitioning from NCAA Division I to NCAA Division II and joined the Gulf South Conference (GSC) for some sports (excluding basketball) during the 2011–12 school year, only for the school to later announce its intentions to stay at NCAA Division I.) (2010–13)	Southland (SLC) (2013–present)
University of Southwestern Louisiana (Note: Currently known as the University of Louisiana at Lafayette since 1999.)	Ragin' Cajuns	Lafayette, Louisiana	1898	Public	1987	1991	Sun Belt (SBC) (1991–present)	
University of Texas–Pan American (Note: UTPA merged with the University of Texas at Brownsville (UTB) in 2013 to form the University of Texas Rio Grande Valley (UTRGV), with the new university beginning full operation in the 2015–16 school year.)	Broncs (Note: The UTPA athletic program was transferred directly to UTRGV, with the nickname changing to Vaqueros once UTRGV began operation.)	Edinburg, Texas (Note: The UTRGV athletic program is based at the former UTPA main campus in Edinburg.)	1927	Public	1987	1991	various (Note: Texas–Rio Grande Valley (UTRGV, formerly Texas–Pan American or UTPA) had joined the following subsequent conferences: the Sun Belt Conference (SBC) from 1991–92 to 1997–98; as an NCAA D-I Independent from 1998–99 to 2007–08; the Great West Conference (GWC) from 2008–09 to 2012–13; and the Western Athletic Conference (WAC) from 2013–14 to 2023–24.)	Southland (SLC) (2024–present) (Note: UTRGV maintains UTPA's WAC membership.)

== Champions ==
=== Men's basketball ===
==== Regular season ====
- 1988 Louisiana Tech, New Orleans
- 1989 New Orleans
- 1990 Louisiana Tech, New Orleans
- 1991 Arkansas State, New Orleans

==== Conference tournament ====
- 1988 Louisiana Tech
- 1989 Louisiana Tech
- 1990 New Orleans
- 1991 Louisiana Tech

=== Women's basketball ===
==== Regular season ====
- 1988 Louisiana Tech
- 1989 Louisiana Tech
- 1990 Louisiana Tech
- 1991 Lamar

==== Conference tournament ====
- 1988 Louisiana Tech
- 1989 Louisiana Tech
- 1990 Louisiana Tech
- 1991 Louisiana Tech

=== Baseball ===
==== Regular season ====
- 1988 New Orleans
- 1989 Southwestern Louisiana
- 1990 Southwestern Louisiana
- 1991 Southwestern Louisiana

==== Conference tournament ====
- 1988 Southwestern Louisiana
- 1989 New Orleans
- 1990 Southwestern Louisiana
- 1991 Southwestern Louisiana

== See also ==
- American South Conference Men's Basketball Player of the Year
