= List of Penn State Nittany Lions basketball seasons =

This is a list of seasons completed by the Penn State Nittany Lions men's basketball program.

== Seasons ==
Statistics overview
Season	Coach	Overall	Conference	Standing	Postseason
No coach (Independent) (1896–1912)
1896–97	No coach	1–1			
1897–98	No coach	2–1			
1898–99	No coach	2–3			
1899–1900	No coach	7–1			
1900–01	No coach	5–1			
1901–02	No coach	9–2			
1902–03	No coach	3–5			
1903–04	No coach	5–4			
1904–05	No coach	6–2			
1905–06	No coach	6–4			
1906–07	No coach	5–6			
1907–08	No coach	10–4			
1908–09	No coach	7–6			
1909–10	No coach	8–6			
1910–11	No coach	9–4			
1911–12	No coach	8–5			
J.F. Haddow (Independent) (1912–1913)
1912–13	J.F. Haddow	8–3			
1913–14	J.F. Haddow	8–4			
J.F. Park (Independent) (1914–1915)
1914–15	J.F. Park	10–3			
Dutch Hermann (Independent) (1915–1917)
1915–16	Dutch Hermann	8–3			
1916–17	Dutch Hermann	12–2			
No coach (Independent) (1917–1918)
1917–18	No coach	12–1			
Hugo Bezdek (Independent) (1918–1919)
1918–19	Hugo Bezdek	11–1			
Dutch Hermann (Independent) (1919–1932)
1919–20	Dutch Hermann	12–1			
1920–21	Dutch Hermann	14–2			
1921–22	Dutch Hermann	9–5			
1922–23	Dutch Hermann	13–1			
1923–24	Dutch Hermann	13–2			
1924–25	Dutch Hermann	12–2			
1925–26	Dutch Hermann	7–7			
1926–27	Dutch Hermann	14–4			
1927–28	Dutch Hermann	10–5			
1928–29	Dutch Hermann	10–9			
1929–30	Dutch Hermann	5–9			
1930–31	Dutch Hermann	3–12			
1931–32	Dutch Hermann	6–9			
Earl Leslie (Independent) (1932–1935)
1932–33	Earl Leslie	7–4			
1933–34	Earl Leslie	8–4			
1934–35	Earl Leslie	8–9			
Earl Leslie (Eastern Intercollegiate Conference) (1935–1936)
1935–36	Earl Leslie	6–11	0–10	6th	
John Lawther (Eastern Intercollegiate Conference) (1936–1939)
1936–37	John Lawther	10–7	6–4	3rd	
1937–38	John Lawther	13–5	6–4	2nd	
1938–39	John Lawther	13–10	5–5	T–3rd	
John Lawther (Independent) (1939–1949)
1939–40	John Lawther	15–8			
1940–41	John Lawther	15–5			
1941–42	John Lawther	18–3			NCAA Elite Eight
1942–43	John Lawther	15–4			
1943–44	John Lawther	8–7			
1944–45	John Lawther	10–7			
1945–46	John Lawther	7–9			
1946–47	John Lawther	10–8			
1947–48	John Lawther	9–10			
1948–49	John Lawther	7–10			
Elmer Gross (Independent) (1949–1954)
1949–50	Elmer Gross	13–10			
1950–51	Elmer Gross	14–9			
1951–52	Elmer Gross	20–6			NCAA Sweet Sixteen
1952–53	Elmer Gross	15–9			
1953–54	Elmer Gross	18–6			NCAA final Four
John Egli (Independent) (1954–1968)
1954–55	John Egli	18-10			NCAA Sweet Sixteen
1955–56	John Egli	12-14			
1956–57	John Egli	15-10			
1957–58	John Egli	8-11			
1958–59	John Egli	11-9			
1959–60	John Egli	11-11			
1960–61	John Egli	11-13			
1961–62	John Egli	12-11			
1962–63	John Egli	15-5			
1963–64	John Egli	16-7			
1964–65	John Egli	20-4			NCAA University Division first round
1965–66	John Egli	18-6			NIT first round
1966–67	John Egli	10-14			
1967–68	John Egli	10-10			
Johnny Bach (Independent) (1968–1976)
1968–69	Johnny Bach	13–9			
1969–70	Johnny Bach	13–11			
1970–71	Johnny Bach	10–12			
1971–72	Johnny Bach	17–8			
1972–73	Johnny Bach	15–8			
1973–74	Johnny Bach	14–12			
1974–75	Johnny Bach	11–12			
1975–76	Johnny Bach	10–15			
Johnny Bach (Eastern Collegiate Basketball League / Eastern Athletic Association) (1976–1978)
1976–77	Johnny Bach	11–15	5–5	T–1st (West)	
1977–78	Johnny Bach	8–19	4–6	T–2nd (West)	
Dick Harter (Eastern Athletic Association) (1978–1979)
1978–79	Dick Harter	12–18	4–6	6th	
Dick Harter (Independent) (1979–1982)
1979–80	Dick Harter	18–10			NIT first round
1980–81	Dick Harter	17–10			
1981–82	Dick Harter	15–12			
Dick Harter (Atlantic 10 Conference) (1982–1983)
1982–83	Dick Harter	17–11	9–5	4th	
Bruce Parkhill (Atlantic 10 Conference) (1983–1991)
1983–84	Bruce Parkhill	5–22	3–15	10th	
1984–85	Bruce Parkhill	8–19	4–14	9th	
1985–86	Bruce Parkhill	12–17	5–13	T–8th	
1986–87	Bruce Parkhill	15–12	9–9	T–4th	
1987–88	Bruce Parkhill	13–14	9–9	T–4th	
1988–89	Bruce Parkhill	20–12	12–6	4th	NIT second round
1989–90	Bruce Parkhill	25–9	13–5	2nd	NIT Third Place
1990–91	Bruce Parkhill	21–11	10–8	T–3rd	NCAA Division I second round
Bruce Parkhill (Independent) (1991–1992)
1991–92	Bruce Parkhill	21–8			NIT Opening Round
Bruce Parkhill (Big Ten Conference) (1992–1995)
1992–93	Bruce Parkhill	7–20	2–16	10th	
1993–94	Bruce Parkhill	13–14	6–12	8th	
1994–95	Bruce Parkhill	21–11	9–9	7th	NIT Third Place
Jerry Dunn (Big Ten Conference) (1995–2003)
1995–96	Jerry Dunn	21–7	12–6	T–2nd	NCAA Division I first round
1996–97	Jerry Dunn	10–17	3–15	10th	
1997–98	Jerry Dunn	19–13	8–8	7th	NIT Runner-up
1998–99	Jerry Dunn	13–14	5–11	T–8th	
1999–2000	Jerry Dunn	19–16	5–11	9th	NIT 3rd Place
2000–01	Jerry Dunn	21–12	7–9	T–5th	NCAA Division I Sweet Sixteen
2001–02	Jerry Dunn	7–21	3–13	10th	
2002–03	Jerry Dunn	7–21	2–14	11th	
Ed DeChellis (Big Ten Conference) (2003–2011)
2003–04	Ed DeChellis	9–19	3–13	T–10th	
2004–05	Ed DeChellis	7–23	1–15	11th	
2005–06	Ed DeChellis	15–15	6–10	T–8th	NIT Opening Round
2006–07	Ed DeChellis	11–19	2–14	T–10th	
2007–08	Ed DeChellis	15–16	7–11	7th	
2008–09	Ed DeChellis	27–11	10–8	T–4th	NIT Champion
2009–10	Ed DeChellis	11–20	3–15	11th	
2010–11	Ed DeChellis	19–15	9–9	T–4th	NCAA Division I second round
Pat Chambers (Big Ten Conference) (2011–2020)
2011–12	Pat Chambers	12–20	4–14	T–11th	
2012–13	Pat Chambers	10–21	2–16	12th	
2013–14	Pat Chambers	16–18	6–12	T–10th	CBI Quarterfinal
2014–15	Pat Chambers	18–16	4–14	13th	
2015–16	Pat Chambers	16–16	7–11	10th	
2016–17	Pat Chambers	15–18	6–12	T–12th	
2017–18	Pat Chambers	26–13	9–9	T–6th	NIT Champion
2018–19	Pat Chambers	14–18	7-13	T-10th	
2019–20	Pat Chambers	21–10	11–9	T–5th	No postseason held
Jim Ferry (Big Ten Conference) (2020–2021)
2020–21	Jim Ferry	11–14	7–12	T–10th	
Micah Shrewsberry (Big Ten Conference) (2021–2023)
2021–22	Micah Shrewsberry	14–17	7–13	T–10th	
2022–23	Micah Shrewsberry	23–14	10–10	T–10th	NCAA Division I second round
Mike Rhoades (Big Ten Conference) (2023–current)
2023–24	Mike Rhoades	16–17	9–11	T–11th	
2024–25	Mike Rhoades	16–15	6–14	17th	
2025–26	Mike Rhoades	12–20	3–17	18th	
Total:		1,588–1,294–1			
National champion Postseason invitational champion Conference regular season champion Conference regular season and conference tournament champion Division regular season champion Division regular season and conference tournament champion Conference tournament champion
