= List of Penn State Nittany Lions basketball head coaches =

The following is a list of Penn State Nittany Lions basketball head coaches. There have been 15 head coaches of the Nittany Lions in their 128-season history.

Penn State's current head coach is Mike Rhoades. He was hired as the Nittany Lions' head coach in March 2023, replacing Micah Shrewsberry, who left to become the head coach at Notre Dame.

== Key ==
General
#	Number of coaches (Note: A running total of the number of head coaches.)
**GC**	Games coached
†	Elected to the National Collegiate Basketball Hall of Fame

Overall
**OW**	Wins
**OL**	Losses
**O%**	Winning percentage

Conference (Note: The Nittany Lions played as an Independent from their first years until joining the Eastern Intercollegiate Conference in 1935 through 1939. They returned to Independent play from 1939 through 1976, when they became members of the Eastern Collegiate Basketball League / Eastern Athletic Association until returning to Independent from 1979 to 1982. In 1982 Penn State joined the Atlantic 10 Conference and played as a member until 1991. Penn State played as an Independent for the 1991-92 season and joined the Big Ten Conference for the 1992-93 season.)
**CW**	Wins
**CL**	Losses
**C%**	Winning percentage

NCAA Tournament (Note: Postseason play involving the NCAA Division I men's basketball tournament.)
**TA**	Total appearances (Note: NCAA Division I men's basketball tournament appearances since the tournament began in 1939.)
**TW**	Total wins
**TL**	Total losses

Championships
**NC**	National championships
**CC**	Conference regular season
**CT**	Conference tournaments

Bold = leader in each category

== Coaches ==
List of head basketball coaches showing season(s) coached, overall records, conference records, NCAA Tournament records, championships and selected awards. Statistics correct as of January 19, 2026.
#	Name	Term	GC	OW	OL	O%	CW	CL	C%	TA	TW	TL	CCs	CTs	NCs
—	No coach	**1896–1915, 1917-1918**	197	131	66	.665	—	—	—	—	—	—	—	—	—
1, 2	Burke M. "Dutch" Hermann	1915–1917, 1919–1932	221	148	73	.670	—	—	—	—	—	—	—	—	—
Int.	Hugo Bezdek	1918–1919	13	11	2	**.846**	—	—	—	—	—	—	—	—	—
3	Earl Leslie	1932–1936	57	29	28	.509	0	10	.000	—	—	—	0	—	—
4	John Lawther	1936–1949	243	150	93	.617	17	13	**.567**	1	1	1	0	—	0
5	Elmer Gross	1949–1954	120	80	40	.667	—	—	—	**2**	**4**	**3**	—	—	0
6	John Egli	1954–1968	322	**187**	135	.707	—	—	—	**2**	1	**3**	—	—	0
7	Johnny Bach	1968–1978	243	122	121	.502	9	11	.450	0	0	0	0	0	0
8	Dick Harter	1978–1983	140	79	61	.564	13	11	.542	0	0	0	0	0	0
9	Bruce Parkhill	1983–1995	**350**	181	**169**	.517	**82**	**116**	.542	1	1	1	0	**1**	0
10	Jerry Dunn	1995–2003	238	117	121	.492	45	87	.341	**2**	2	2	0	0	0
11	Ed DeChellis	2003–2011	252	114	138	.452	41	95	.301	1	0	1	0	0	0
12	Pat Chambers	2011–2020	298	148	150	.497	56	110	.337	0	0	0	0	0	0
Int.	Jim Ferry	2020–2021	25	11	14	.440	7	12	.368	0	0	0	0	0	0
13	Micah Shrewsberry	2021–2023	68	37	31	.544	17	23	.425	1	1	1	0	0	0
14	Mike Rhoades	2023–Present	82	41	41	.500	15	32	.319	0	0	0	0	0	0

NCAA Tournament
	Coach	Appearances
Final Four	Elmer Gross	1 (1954)
Elite Eight	John Lawther	1 (1942)
Elite Eight	Elmer Gross	1 (1954)
Sweet Sixteen	Elmer Gross	2 (1952, 1954)
Sweet Sixteen	John Egli	1 (1955)
Sweet Sixteen	Jerry Dunn	1 (2001)
