= List of Coastal Carolina Chanticleers men's basketball head coaches =

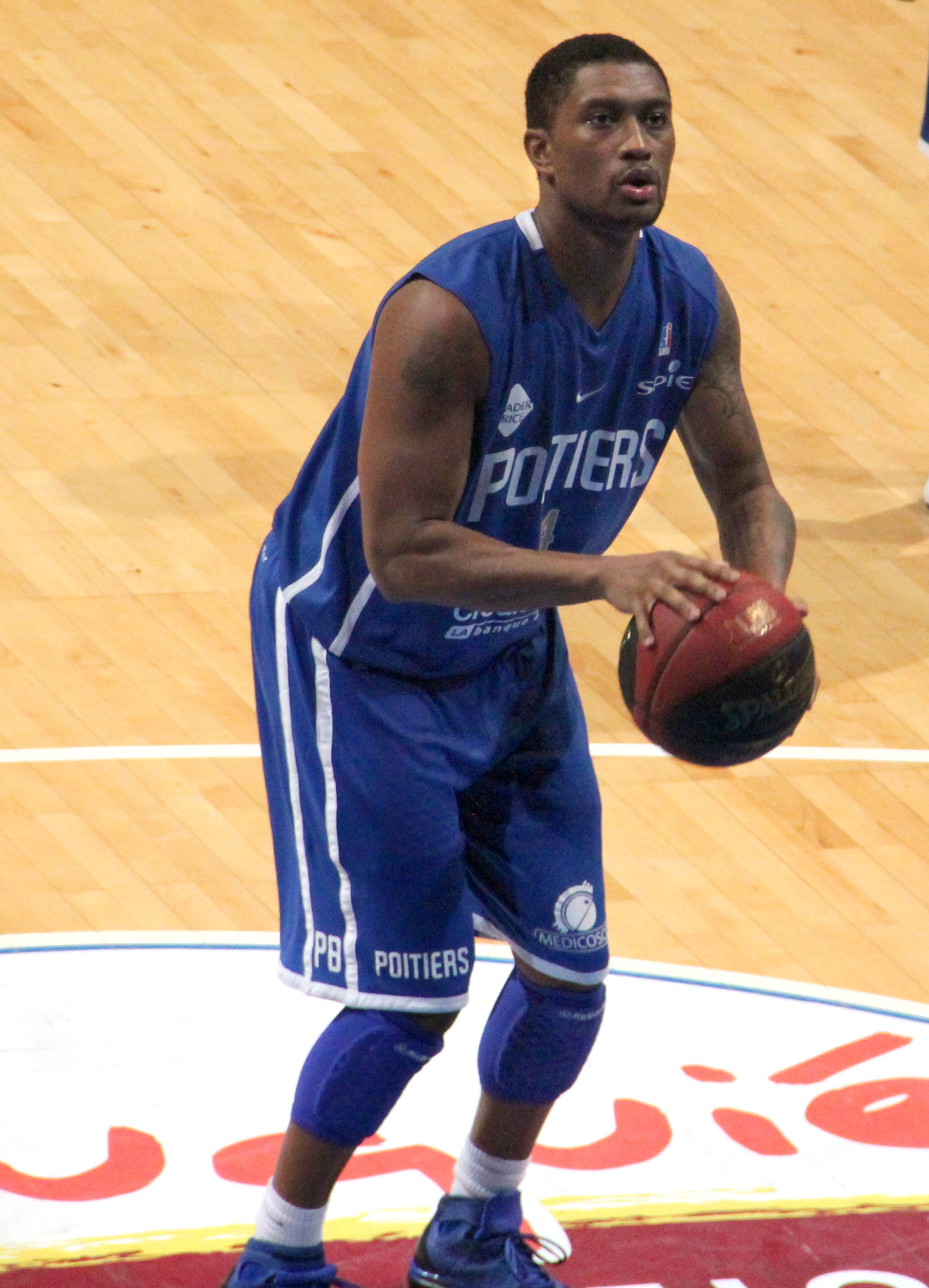
Justin Gray, the current head coach of the Coastal Carolina Chanticleers.

The following is a list of Coastal Carolina Chanticleers men's basketball head coaches. There have been seven head coaches of the Chanticleers in their 50-season history.

Coastal Carolina's current head coach is Justin Gray. He was hired as the Chanticleers' head coach in March 2024, replacing Benny Moss, who was the interim head coach following the retirement of long-time head coach Cliff Ellis.

No.	Tenure	Coach	Years	Record	Pct.
1	1974–1975	Dan Selwa	1	6–17	.261
2	1975–1994	Russ Bergman	19	306–246	.554
3	1994–1998	Michael Hopkins	4	30–76	.283
4	1998–2005	Pete Strickland	7	70–127	.355
5	2005–2007	Buzz Peterson	2	35–25	.583
6	2007–2023	Cliff Ellis	17	297–227	.567
7	2023–2024	Benny Moss	1	5–16	.238
8	2024–present	Justin Gray	2	29–35	.453
Totals		8 coaches	50 seasons	759–756	.501
Records updated through end of 2024–25 season Source
