= 1991 Big South Conference men's basketball tournament =

- Classification: Division I
- Season: 1990–91
- Teams: 8
- Site: Civic Center of Anderson; Anderson, SC
- Champions: Coastal Carolina (2nd title)
- Winning coach: Russ Bergman (2nd title)
- MVP: Tony Dunkin (Coastal Carolina)

1990–91 Big South Conference men's basketball standings
	Conf.				Overall
Team	W		L	PCT	W		L	PCT
Coastal Carolina †	13	–	1	.929	24	–	8	.750
Radford	12	–	2	.857	22	–	7	.759
Augusta State	9	–	5	.643	14	–	16	.467
Davidson	6	–	8	.429	10	–	19	.345
Winthrop	5	–	9	.357	8	–	20	.286
UNC Asheville	4	–	10	.286	8	–	20	.286
Charleston Southern	4	–	10	.286	9	–	19	.321
Campbell	3	–	11	.214	9	–	19	.321
† 1991 Big South tournament winner Rankings from AP Poll

The 1991 Big South Conference men's basketball tournament took place February 28 – March 2, 1991, at the Civic Center of Anderson in Anderson, South Carolina. For the second time in their school history, Coastal Carolina won the tournament, led by head coach Russ Bergman. The Chanticleers advanced to face Jackson State in a play-in game for the right to advance to the 1991 NCAA tournament. Coastal Carolina defeated Jackson State, 78–59, to secure the Big South Conference's first ever bid to the NCAA tournament (the conference tournament's winner did not receive an automatic bid from 1986 to 1990), and their first tournament bid in school history.

== Format ==
All of the conference's eight members participated in the tournament, hosted at the Civic Center of Anderson. This was the first season for Davidson as a member of the conference.

== Bracket ==
Quarterfinals; February 28
1	Coastal Carolina	83
8	Campbell	46
4	Davidson	63
5	Winthrop	48
3	Augusta State	62
6	UNC Asheville	53
2	Radford	75
7	Charleston Southern	70

Semifinals; March 1
1	Coastal Carolina	58
4	Davidson	55
2	Radford	56
3	Augusta State	69

Finals; March 2
1	Coastal Carolina	89
3	Augusta State	54

* Asterisk indicates overtime game

- Source

== All-Tournament Team ==
- Tony Dunkin, Coastal Carolina
- Brian Penny, Coastal Carolina
- Robert Dowdell, Coastal Carolina
- Keenan Mann, Augusta State
- Derek Stewart, Augusta State
