= 1990–91 New Orleans Privateers men's basketball team =

American college basketball season

1990–91 New Orleans Privateers men's basketball

American South Regional Season co-champion

NCAA tournament
- Conference: American South Conference
- Record: 23–8 (9–3 ASC)
- Head coach: Tim Floyd (3rd season)
- Assistant coach: John Brady (1st season)
- Home arena: Lakefront Arena

1990–91 American South Conference men's basketball standings
	Conf.				Overall
Team	W		L	PCT	W		L	PCT
New Orleans	9	–	3	.750	23	–	8	.742
Arkansas State	9	–	3	.750	23	–	9	.719
Louisiana Tech †	8	–	4	.667	21	–	10	.677
Southwestern Louisiana	6	–	6	.500	21	–	10	.677
Lamar	4	–	8	.333	15	–	13	.536
UCF	3	–	9	.250	10	–	17	.370
Texas–Pan American	3	–	9	.250	7	–	21	.250
† 1991 American South tournament winner Rankings from AP Poll

The 1990–91 New Orleans Privateers men's basketball team represented the University of New Orleans during the 1990–91 NCAA Division I men's basketball season. The Privateers led by third-year head coach Tim Floyd, played their home games at Lakefront Arena and played as a member of the American South Conference. They finished the season 23–8 (9–3 ASC) and tied for the regular season conference title with Arkansas State. New Orleans lost in championship game of the American South Conference tournament, but earned a bid to the NCAA tournament as the No. 14 seed in the Southeast region. The Privateers would lose in the opening round to eventual National Runner-up Kansas, 55–49.

== Roster ==
1990–91 New Orleans Privateers men's basketball team
Players
Coaches

Pos.	#	Name	Height	Weight	Year	Previous school	Hometown
PF	21	Tank Collins	6 ft 5 in (1.96 m)	210 lb (95 kg)	Sr	Pomona HS	Pomona, CA
F	32	Melvin Simon	6 ft 8 in (2.03 m)	220 lb (100 kg)	Fr	Archbishop Shaw	Harvey, Louisiana
C	40	Ervin Johnson	6 ft 11 in (2.11 m)	235 lb (107 kg)	So	Block HS	Jonesville, LA

Head coach

- Tim Floyd (Louisiana Tech)

Assistant coach(es)

- John Brady (Belhaven)

Legend

- (C) Team captain
- (S) Suspended
- (I) Ineligible
- (W) Walk-on
- Injured
- Current redshirt

== Schedule and results ==
Date time, TV	Rank^{#}	Opponent^{#}	Result	Record	Site (attendance) city, state
Regular season
Nov 14, 1990*		at No. 15 Oklahoma	L 65–95	0–1	Lloyd Noble Center; Norman, Oklahoma
Nov 27, 1990*		Oklahoma State	L 64–74	0–2	Lakefront Arena; New Orleans, Louisiana
Nov 30, 1990*		at No. 16 Virginia	W 60–55	1–2	University Hall; Charlottesville, Virginia
Dec 4, 1990*		North Georgia	W 96–37	2–2	Lakefront Arena; New Orleans, Louisiana
Dec 8, 1990*		Nicholls State	W 88–66	3–2	Lakefront Arena; New Orleans, Louisiana
Dec 12, 1990*		Oregon State	W 68–64	4–2	Lakefront Arena; New Orleans, Louisiana
Dec 15, 1990*		South Alabama	W 96–95	5–2	Kiefer Lakefront Arena; New Orleans, Louisiana
Dec 17, 1990*		Florida A&M	W 76–41	6–2	Lakefront Arena; New Orleans, Louisiana
Dec 27, 1990*		at US International	W 98–58	7–2	Golden Hall; San Diego, California
Dec 29, 1990*		Grambling State	W 88–66	8–2	Lakefront Arena; New Orleans, Louisiana
Jan 2, 1991*		Columbia	W 83–53	9–2	Lakefront Arena; New Orleans, Louisiana
Jan 5, 1991		at Southwestern Louisiana	W 66–64	10–2 (1–0)	Cajundome; Lafayette, Louisiana
Jan 6, 1991*		Coppin State	W 84–77	11–2	Lakefront Arena; New Orleans, Louisiana
Jan 10, 1991		Arkansas State	W 66–51	12–2 (2–0)	Lakefront Arena; New Orleans, Louisiana
Jan 12, 1991		at Louisiana Tech	W 72–68	13–2 (3–0)	Thomas Assembly Center; Ruston, Louisiana
Jan 17, 1991		Lamar	W 76–66	14–2 (4–0)	Lakefront Arena; New Orleans, Louisiana
Jan 19, 1991		Texas–Pan American	W 72–54	15–2 (5–0)	Lakefront Arena; New Orleans, Louisiana
Jan 23, 1991	No. 24	UCF	W 72–64	16–2 (6–0)	Lakefront Arena; New Orleans, Louisiana
Jan 25, 1991*	No. 24	UAB	W 81–70	17–2	Lakefront Arena; New Orleans, Louisiana
Jan 28, 1991*	No. 22	at Tulane	L 83–84	17–3	Avron B. Fogelman Arena; New Orleans, Louisiana
Jan 30, 1991*	No. 22	Northeastern Illinois	W 83–51	18–3	Lakefront Arena; New Orleans, Louisiana
Feb 2, 1991	No. 22	Southwestern Louisiana	W 69–60	19–3 (7–0)	Lakefront Arena; New Orleans, Louisiana
Feb 6, 1991	No. 21	at Arkansas State	L 65–76	19–4 (7–1)	Convocation Center; Jonesboro, Arkansas
Feb 9, 1991	No. 21	Louisiana Tech	L 63–68	19–5 (7–2)	Lakefront Arena; New Orleans, Louisiana
Feb 14, 1991		at Lamar	W 85–75	20–5 (8–2)	Montagne Center; Beaumont, Texas
Feb 16, 1991		at Texas–Pan American	L 67–73	20–6 (8–3)	UTPA Fieldhouse; Edinburg, Texas
Feb 21, 1991		at UCF	W 77–65	21–6 (9–3)	UCF Gym; Orlando, Florida
Feb 23, 1991*		at Nicholls State	W 67–52	22–6	Stopher Gymnasium; Thibodaux, Louisiana
American South Conference tournament
Mar 2, 1991*		Southwestern Louisiana; Semifinal	W 78–73	23–6	Lakefront Arena; New Orleans, Louisiana
Mar 3, 1991*		Louisiana Tech; Championship Game	L 56–61	23–7	Lakefront Arena; New Orleans, Louisiana
NCAA tournament
Mar 14, 1991*	(14 SE)	vs. (3 SE) No. 12 Kansas; First Round	L 49–55	23–8	Freedom Hall; Louisville, Kentucky
*Non-conference game. ^{#}Rankings from AP poll. (#) Tournament seedings in parentheses. All times are in Central Time.

== Awards and honors ==
- Tank Collins – American South Men's Player of the Year
