= 1991 MAC men's basketball tournament =

- Classification: Division I
- Season: 1990–91
- Teams: 8
- Site: Cobo Arena; Detroit, Michigan
- Champions: Eastern Michigan (2nd title)
- Winning coach: Ben Braun (2nd title)
- MVP: Marcus Kennedy (Eastern Michigan)
- MAC men's basketball tournaments

1990–91 Mid-American Conference men's basketball standings
	Conf.				Overall
Team	W		L	PCT	W		L	PCT
Eastern Michigan †	13	–	3	.813	26	–	7	.788
Miami (OH)	10	–	6	.625	16	–	12	.571
Ball State	10	–	6	.625	21	–	10	.677
Bowling Green	9	–	7	.563	17	–	13	.567
Ohio	9	–	7	.563	16	–	12	.571
Central Michigan	8	–	8	.500	14	–	14	.500
Toledo	7	–	9	.438	17	–	16	.515
Kent State	4	–	12	.250	10	–	18	.357
Western Michigan	2	–	14	.125	5	–	22	.185
† 1991 Mid-American Conference tournament winner Rankings from AP Poll

The 1991 MAC men's basketball tournament took place March 8–10, 1991, at Cobo Arena in Detroit, Michigan. Eastern Michigan defeated Toledo, 67–66 in the championship game, to win its second MAC Tournament title.

The Eagles earned an automatic bid to the 1991 NCAA tournament as #12 seed in the East region. In the round of 64, Eastern Michigan defeated Mississippi State 76–56, and followed that with a 71–68 win over Penn State to earn its first NCAA Tournament Sweet Sixteen appearance in program history.

== Format ==
Eight of nine conference members participated, with play beginning in the quarterfinal round. Western Michigan was left out of the tournament field.

== Bracket ==
Quarterfinals; March 8
1	Eastern Michigan	66
8	Kent State	47
4	Bowling Green	66
5	Ohio	58
3	Ball State	77
6	Central Michigan	69
2	Miami (OH)	59
7	Toledo	70

Semifinals; March 9
1	Eastern Michigan	72
4	Bowling Green	66
3	Ball State	61
7	Toledo	62

Final; March 10
1	Eastern Michigan	67
7	Toledo	66
