= Jerry Loyd =

American basketball coach

Biographical details
- Born: August 2, 1954 (age 72)

Playing career
- ?: LeTourneau

Coaching career (HC unless noted)
- 1989–1994: Louisiana Tech
- 1994–1998: Dillard

Administrative career (AD unless noted)
- 1997–1998: Dillard

Head coaching record
- Overall: 156–113

Accomplishments and honors

Championships
- 2 American South regular season (1990, 1992); American South tournament (1991); 2 GCAC regular season (1996, 1997)

Awards
- Division 8 Coach of the Year (1990)

Jerry Loyd (born August 2, 1954) is a former American college basketball coach. He is a former head men's basketball coach at Louisiana Tech University. After leaving Louisiana Tech in 1994, Loyd was the head men's basketball coach at Dillard University from 1994–1998 and the school's Athletic Director from 1997–1998.

== Head coaching record ==
Record table
Season	Team	Overall	Conference	Standing	Postseason
Louisiana Tech Bulldogs (American South Conference) (1989–1991)
1989–90	Louisiana Tech	20–8	8–2	T–1st	NIT first round
1990–91	Louisiana Tech	21–10	8–4	3rd	NCAA Division I first round
Louisiana Tech:		41–18	16–6		
Louisiana Tech Bulldogs (Sun Belt Conference) (1991–1994)
1991–92	Louisiana Tech	22–9	13–3	T–1st	NIT first round
1992–93	Louisiana Tech	7–21	3–15	T–8th	
1993–94	Louisiana Tech	2–25	0–18	10th	
Louisiana Tech:		31–55	17–37		
Dillard Bleu Devils (Gulf Coast Athletic Conference) (1994–1998)
1994–95	Dillard	16–16	7–9	T–5th	
1995–96	Dillard	26–7	15–3	1st	
1996–97	Dillard	20–13	13–5	1st	NAIA second round
1997–98	Dillard	20–14	11–7	5th	
Dillard:		84–40	46–24		
Total:		156–113			
National champion Postseason invitational champion Conference regular season champion Conference regular season and conference tournament champion Division regular season champion Division regular season and conference tournament champion Conference tournament champion
