= 1990–91 Eastern Michigan Hurons men's basketball team =

American college basketball season

1990–91 Eastern Michigan Hurons men's basketball

MAC Regular season champions MAC tournament champions

NCAA tournament, Sweet Sixteen
- Conference: Mid-American Conference
- Record: 26–7 (13–3 MAC)
- Head coach: Ben Braun (6th season)
- Assistant coaches: Brian Miller; Gary Waters (2nd season)
- Home arena: Bowen Field House

1990–91 Mid-American Conference men's basketball standings
	Conf.				Overall
Team	W		L	PCT	W		L	PCT
Eastern Michigan †	13	–	3	.813	26	–	7	.788
Miami (OH)	10	–	6	.625	16	–	12	.571
Ball State	10	–	6	.625	21	–	10	.677
Bowling Green	9	–	7	.563	17	–	13	.567
Ohio	9	–	7	.563	16	–	12	.571
Central Michigan	8	–	8	.500	14	–	14	.500
Toledo	7	–	9	.438	17	–	16	.515
Kent State	4	–	12	.250	10	–	18	.357
Western Michigan	2	–	14	.125	5	–	22	.185
† 1991 Mid-American Conference tournament winner Rankings from AP Poll

The 1990–91 Eastern Michigan Hurons men's basketball team represented Eastern Michigan University during the 1990–91 NCAA Division I men's basketball season. The Hurons, led by head coach Ben Braun, played their home games at Bowen Field House and were members of the Mid-American Conference. They finished the season 26–7, 13–3 in MAC play. They were MAC Regular season and MAC tournament champions, and received an automatic bid to the NCAA tournament as No. 12 seed in the East region. The Hurons made a run to the Sweet Sixteen, defeating Mississippi State and Penn State before falling to No. 1 seed North Carolina in the East regional semifinals.

A Sweet 16 Reunion was held February 12, 2011 to honor the 1990–91 team.

== Roster ==
1990–91 Eastern Michigan Hurons men's basketball team
Players
Coaches

Pos.	#	Name	Height	Weight	Year	Previous school	Hometown
G	15	Lorenzo Neely	—	—	Sr
G	23	Charles Thomas	6 ft 4 in (1.93 m)	180 lb (82 kg)	Sr	Everett HS	Lansing, Michigan
G/F	31	Carl Thomas	6 ft 4 in (1.93 m)	175 lb (79 kg)	Sr	Everett HS	Lansing, Michigan
F	32	Kory Hallas	—	—	Jr
C	54	Marcus Kennedy	6 ft 7 in (2.01 m)	245 lb (111 kg)	Sr	Troy HS; Ferris State	Troy, Michigan

Head coach

- Ben Braun

Assistant coach(es)

- Brian Miller
- Gary Waters
- Craig Rasmuson (graduate assistant)
- Charles E. Ramsey (volunteer assistant)

Legend

- (C) Team captain
- (S) Suspended
- (I) Ineligible
- (W) Walk-on
- Injured
- Current redshirt

== Schedule and results ==
Date time, TV	Rank^{#}	Opponent^{#}	Result	Record	Site (attendance) city, state
Regular season
Nov 24, 1990*		Saint Mary's College	W 102–77	1–0	Bowen Field House; Ypsilanti, Michigan
Nov 29, 1990*		Northern Michigan	W 87–64	2–0	Bowen Field House; Ypsilanti, Michigan
Dec 4, 1990*		at Michigan	L 76–78	2–1	Crisler Arena; Ann Arbor, Michigan
Dec 7, 1990*		vs. American; Mile High Classic	W 92–83 ^{OT}	3–1	CU Events/Conference Center; Boulder, Colorado
Dec 8, 1990*		at Colorado; Mile High Classic	L 81–88	3–2	CU Events/Conference Center; Boulder, Colorado
Dec 12, 1990*		Cleveland State	W 87–75	4–2	Bowen Field House; Ypsilanti, Michigan
Dec 15, 1990*		at Detroit	L 81–85	4–3	Calihan Hall; Detroit, Michigan
Dec 22, 1990*		Boston University	W 100–54	5–3	Bowen Field House; Ypsilanti, Michigan
Dec 29, 1990*		at Evansville	W 75–65	6–3	Roberts Stadium; Evansville, Indiana
Jan 2, 1991		at Ball State	W 68–59	7–3 (1–0)	Irving Gymnasium; Muncie, Indiana
Jan 5, 1991		Miami (OH)	W 86–71	8–3 (2–0)	Bowen Field House; Ypsilanti, Michigan
Jan 9, 1991		at Western Michigan	W 65–55	9–3 (3–0)	University Arena; Kalamazoo, Michigan
Jan 12, 1991		Ohio	W 78–68	10–3 (4–0)	Bowen Field House; Ypsilanti, Michigan
Jan 16, 1991		at Central Michigan	W 63–61	11–3 (5–0)	Rose Arena; Mount Pleasant, Michigan
Jan 19, 1991		Bowling Green	W 73–68	12–3 (6–0)	Bowen Field House; Ypsilanti, Michigan
Jan 22, 1991*		at Wisconsin–Milwaukee	W 79–75	13–3	Klotsche Center; Milwaukee, Wisconsin
Jan 26, 1991		at Toledo	W 82–60	14–3 (7–0)	John F. Savage Hall; Toledo, Ohio
Jan 30, 1991		Kent State	L 74–81	14–4 (7–1)	Bowen Field House; Ypsilanti, Michigan
Feb 2, 1991		at Miami (OH)	L 63–70	14–5 (7–2)	Millett Hall; Oxford, Ohio
Feb 6, 1991		Western Michigan	W 76–59	15–5 (8–2)	Bowen Field House; Ypsilanti, Michigan
Feb 9, 1991		at Ohio	L 58–60	15–6 (8–3)	Convocation Center; Athens, Ohio
Feb 13, 1991		Central Michigan	W 94–58	16–6 (9–3)	Bowen Field House; Ypsilanti, Michigan
Feb 16, 1991		at Bowling Green	W 76–65	17–6 (10–3)	Anderson Arena; Bowling Green, Ohio
Feb 20, 1991*		Chicago State	W 120–77	18–6	Bowen Field House; Ypsilanti, Michigan
Feb 23, 1991		Toledo	W 81–74	19–6 (11–3)	Bowen Field House; Ypsilanti, Michigan
Feb 27, 1991		at Kent State	W 65–46	20–6 (12–3)	Memorial Gymnasium; Kent, Ohio
Mar 2, 1991		Ball State	W 69–59	21–6 (13–3)	Bowen Field House; Ypsilanti, Michigan
MAC tournament
Mar 8, 1991*	(1)	vs. (8) Kent State; Quarterfinals	W 66–47	22–6	Cobo Arena; Detroit, Michigan
Mar 9, 1991*	(1)	vs. (4) Bowling Green; Semifinals	W 72–66 ^{OT}	23–6	Cobo Arena; Detroit, Michigan
Mar 10, 1991*	(1)	vs. (7) Toledo; Championship	W 67–66	24–6	Cobo Arena; Detroit, Michigan
NCAA tournament
Mar 15, 1991*	(12 E)	vs. (5 E) No. 21 Mississippi State; First round	W 76–56	25–6	Carrier Dome; Syracuse, New York
Mar 17, 1991*	(12 E)	vs. (13 E) Penn State; Second Round	W 71–68 ^{OT}	26–6	Carrier Dome; Syracuse, New York
Mar 22, 1991*	(12 E)	vs. (1 E) No. 4 North Carolina; East Regional semifinal – Sweet Sixteen	L 67–93	26–7	Brendan Byrne Arena; East Rutherford, New Jersey
*Non-conference game. ^{#}Rankings from AP Poll. (#) Tournament seedings in parentheses. E=East. All times are in Eastern Time.

== Awards and honors ==
- Marcus Kennedy – MAC Player of the Year
- Ben Braun – MAC Coach of the Year

== NBA draft ==
Round	Pick	Player	NBA club
2	54	Marcus Kennedy	Portland Trail Blazers
