= 1991 SWAC men's basketball tournament =

Basketball Tournament March 1991 in Texas

- Classification: Division I
- Season: 1990–91
- Teams: 7
- Site: Health and Physical Education Arena; Houston, Texas
- Champions: Jackson State (2nd title)
- Winning coach: Andy Stoglin (1st title)

1990–91 SWAC men's basketball standings
	Conf.				Overall
Team	W		L	PCT	W		L	PCT
Jackson State †	10	–	2	.833	17	–	13	.567
Southern	8	–	4	.667	19	–	9	.679
Alabama State	7	–	5	.583	18	–	11	.621
Texas Southern	7	–	5	.583	13	–	17	.433
Mississippi Valley State	4	–	8	.333	9	–	19	.321
Alcorn State	3	–	9	.250	8	–	21	.276
Grambling	3	–	9	.250	6	–	22	.214
Prairie View A&M	0	–	0	–	4	–	21	.160
† 1991 SWAC tournament winner Rankings from AP Poll

The 1991 SWAC men's basketball tournament was held February 28–March 2, 1991, at the Health and Physical Education Arena in Houston, Texas. Jackson State defeated Texas Southern, 70–66 in the championship game. The Tigers lost a play-in game to Coastal Carolina, therefore no SWAC teams reached the 1991 NCAA tournament.

== Bracket and results ==
Quarterfinals; February 28
4	Alabama State	104
5	Mississippi Valley State	98
3	Texas Southern	78
6	Grambling State	70
2	Southern	75
7	Alcorn State	77

Semifinals; March 1
1	Jackson State	77
4	Alabama State	74
3	Texas Southern	70
7	Alcorn State	63

Final; March 2
1	Jackson State	70
3	Texas Southern	66
