= 1991 American South Conference men's basketball tournament =

- Classification: Division I
- Season: 1990–91
- Teams: 7
- Finals site: Lakefront Arena; New Orleans, LA
- Champions: Louisiana Tech (3rd title)
- Winning coach: Jerry Loyd (1st title)

1990–91 American South Conference men's basketball standings
	Conf.				Overall
Team	W		L	PCT	W		L	PCT
New Orleans	9	–	3	.750	23	–	8	.742
Arkansas State	9	–	3	.750	23	–	9	.719
Louisiana Tech †	8	–	4	.667	21	–	10	.677
Southwestern Louisiana	6	–	6	.500	21	–	10	.677
Lamar	4	–	8	.333	15	–	13	.536
UCF	3	–	9	.250	10	–	17	.370
Texas–Pan American	3	–	9	.250	7	–	21	.250
† 1991 American South tournament winner Rankings from AP Poll

The 1991 American South Conference men's basketball tournament was held March 1–3 at Lakefront Arena at the University of New Orleans in New Orleans, Louisiana.

Louisiana Tech defeated New Orleans in the championship game, 61–56, to take home their third American South men's basketball tournament title in four years.

The Bulldogs received an automatic invitation to the 1991 NCAA Tournament as the #12 seed in the Southeast region. Regular season co-champion New Orleans received an at-large bid as the #14 seed in the Southeast region.

== Format ==
All seven conference members participated in the tournament field. They were seeded based on regular season conference records. The top seed, New Orleans, was given a bye into the semifinals while the other six teams were placed and paired into the initial quarterfinal round.

All games were played at Lakefront Arena in New Orleans, Louisiana.

== Bracket ==
Quarterfinals; Friday, March 1
4	Southwestern Louisiana	99
5	Lamar	83
3	Louisiana Tech	89
6	UCF	57
7	Texas–Pan American	68
2	Arkansas State	80

Semifinals; Saturday, March 2
1	New Orleans	78
4	Southwestern Louisiana	73
3	Louisiana Tech	58
2	Arkansas State	56

Championship; Sunday, March 3
1	New Orleans	56
3	Louisiana Tech	61
