= 1990–91 Temple Owls men's basketball team =

American college basketball season

1990–91 Temple Owls men's basketball

NCAA tournament, Elite Eight
- Conference: Atlantic 10 Conference
- Record: 24–10 (13–5 A–10)
- Head coach: John Chaney (9th season)
- Home arena: McGonigle Hall (Capacity: 4,500)

1990–91 Atlantic 10 men's basketball standings
	Conf.				Overall
Team	W		L	PCT	W		L	PCT
Rutgers	14	–	4	.778	19	–	10	.655
Temple	13	–	5	.722	24	–	10	.706
Penn State †	10	–	8	.556	21	–	11	.656
George Washington	10	–	8	.556	19	–	12	.613
UMass	10	–	8	.556	20	–	13	.606
West Virginia	10	–	8	.556	17	–	14	.548
Duquesne	10	–	8	.556	13	–	15	.464
Saint Joseph's	7	–	11	.389	13	–	17	.433
Rhode Island	6	–	12	.333	11	–	17	.393
St. Bonaventure	0	–	18	.000	5	–	23	.179
† 1991 Atlantic 10 Tournament winner Rankings from AP Poll

The 1990–91 Temple Owls men's basketball team represented Temple University as a member of the Atlantic 10 Conference during the 1990–91 NCAA Division I men's basketball season. The team was led by head coach John Chaney and played their home games at McGonigle Hall. The Owls received an at-large bid to the NCAA tournament as No. 10 seed in the East region. Temple made a run to the Elite Eight before falling to North Carolina in the East regional final, 75–72. The team finished with a record of 24–10 (13–5 A-10).

Players, coaches, and managers of the team were honored in 2016 to commemorate the 25th anniversary of the 1990–91 season.

== Roster ==
1990–91 Temple Owls men's basketball team
Players
Coaches

Pos.	#	Name	Height	Weight	Year	Previous school	Hometown
G	12	Mark Macon	6 ft 4 in (1.93 m)	185 lb (84 kg)	Sr	Buena Vista HS	Saginaw, MI
G/F	23	Aaron McKie (redshirt)	6 ft 5 in (1.96 m)	200 lb (91 kg)	Fr	Simon Gratz HS	Philadelphia, PA
F	24	Mik Kilgore	6 ft 8 in (2.03 m)	210 lb (95 kg)	Jr	West Philadelphia HS	Philadelphia, PA
F	30	Mark Strickland	6 ft 9 in (2.06 m)	205 lb (93 kg)	So	McNair HS	Atlanta, GA
F/C	35	Donald Hodge	7 ft 0 in (2.13 m)	225 lb (102 kg)	Jr	Calvin Coolidge HS	Washington, D.C.

Head coach

- John Chaney

Assistant coach(es)

Legend

- (C) Team captain
- (S) Suspended
- (I) Ineligible
- (W) Walk-on
- Injured
- Current redshirt

Roster

== Schedule ==
Date time, TV	Rank^{#}	Opponent^{#}	Result	Record	Site city, state
Regular season
Nov 14, 1990*	No. 19	at Iowa; Preseason NIT	L 71–73	0–1	Carver-Hawkeye Arena; Iowa City, Iowa
Dec 1, 1990*		at No. 24 Villanova	W 70–57	1–1	The Pavilion; Philadelphia, Pennsylvania
Dec 5, 1990	No. 24	at St. Bonaventure	W 76–52	2–1 (1–0)	Reilly Center; St. Bonaventure, New York
Dec 8, 1990*	No. 24	at No. 21 South Carolina	L 63–87	2–2	Carolina Coliseum; Columbia, South Carolina
Dec 15, 1990*		No. 23 Georgia Tech	W 69–67	3–2	McGonigle Hall; Philadelphia, Pennsylvania
Dec 18, 1990		Penn State	W 67–63	4–2 (2–0)	McGonigle Hall; Philadelphia, Pennsylvania
Dec 27, 1990*		vs. Iowa State; Fiesta Bowl Classic	L 79–81 ^{OT}	4–3	McKale Center; Tucson, Arizona
Dec 28, 1990*		vs. Pepperdine; Fiesta Bowl Classic	W 56–55	5–3	McKale Center; Tucson, Arizona
Jan 3, 1991*		Penn	W 66–49	6–3	McGonigle Hall; Philadelphia, Pennsylvania
Jan 5, 1991*		at La Salle	W 91–86	7–3	Convention Hall; Philadelphia, Pennsylvania
Jan 8, 1991		Rutgers	W 83–62	8–3 (3–0)	McGonigle Hall; Philadelphia, Pennsylvania
Jan 10, 1991		at George Washington	W 70–61	9–3 (4–0)	Charles E. Smith Center; Washington, D.C.
Jan 16, 1991		at Duquesne	L 59–60	9–4 (4–1)	A.J. Palumbo Center; Pittsburgh, Pennsylvania
Jan 19, 1991*		at Clemson	W 71–52	10–4	Littlejohn Coliseum; Clemson, South Carolina
Jan 22, 1991		Saint Joseph's	W 73–56	11–4 (5–1)	McGonigle Hall; Philadelphia, Pennsylvania
Jan 24, 1991		UMass	W 55–53	12–4 (6–1)	McGonigle Hall; Philadelphia, Pennsylvania
Jan 26, 1991		St. Bonaventure	W 77–66	13–4 (7–1)	McGonigle Hall; Philadelphia, Pennsylvania
Jan 28, 1991		at Rhode Island	W 76–61	14–4 (8–1)	Keaney Gymnasium; Kingston, Rhode Island
Feb 2, 1991		at Rutgers	L 73–82	14–5 (8–2)	Louis Brown Athletic Center; Piscataway, New Jersey
Feb 4, 1991		at Saint Joseph's	L 60–66	14–6 (8–3)	Hagan Arena; Philadelphia, Pennsylvania
Feb 7, 1991		George Washington	W 77–60	15–6 (9–3)	McGonigle Hall; Philadelphia, Pennsylvania
Feb 10, 1991		West Virginia	W 88–78 ^{OT}	16–6 (10–3)	McGonigle Hall; Philadelphia, Pennsylvania
Feb 13, 1991		at Penn State	W 69–59	17–6 (11–3)	Rec Hall; University Park, Pennsylvania
Feb 16, 1991*		vs. Notre Dame	W 70–46	18–6	Hersheypark Arena; Hershey, Pennsylvania
Feb 19, 1991*		Rhode Island	L 62–63	18–7 (11–4)	McGonigle Hall; Philadelphia, Pennsylvania
Feb 21, 1991		at UMass	W 80–70	19–7 (12–4)	Curry Hicks Cage; Amherst, Massachusetts
Feb 23, 1991		at West Virginia	L 66–91	19–8 (12–5)	WVU Coliseum; Morgantown, West Virginia
Feb 28, 1991		Duquesne	W 65–51	20–8 (13–5)	McGonigle Hall; Philadelphia, Pennsylvania
Atlantic 10 Tournament
Mar 3, 1991*	(2)	(7) West Virginia; Quarterfinals	W 56–53	21–8	Palestra; Philadelphia, Pennsylvania
Mar 4, 1991*	(2)	(3) Penn State; Semifinals	L 50–52	21–9	Palestra; Philadelphia, Pennsylvania
NCAA Tournament
Mar 14, 1991*	(10 E)	vs. (7 E) Purdue; First round	W 80–63	22–9	Cole Fieldhouse; College Park, Maryland
Mar 16, 1991*	(10 E)	vs. (15 E) Richmond; Second Round	W 77–64	23–9	Cole Fieldhouse; College Park, Maryland
Mar 22, 1991*	(10 E)	vs. (3 E) No. 14 Oklahoma State; East Regional semifinal – Sweet Sixteen	W 72–63 ^{OT}	24–9	Brendan Byrne Arena; East Rutherford, New Jersey
Mar 24, 1991*	(10 E)	vs. (1 E) No. 4 North Carolina; East Regional Final – Elite Eight	L 72–75	24–10	Brendan Byrne Arena; East Rutherford, New Jersey
*Non-conference game. ^{#}Rankings from AP Poll. (#) Tournament seedings in parentheses. E=East. All times are in Eastern Standard Time.

== Awards and honors ==
- Mark Macon – AP Honorable Mention All-American, First-team All-Atlantic 10 (only player named 4x), Robert V. Geasey Trophy, East Region MOP, Temple all-time leading scorer (2,609 points)

== NBA draft ==
Round	Pick	Player	NBA club
1	8	Mark Macon	Denver Nuggets
2	33	Donald Hodge	Dallas Mavericks
