= 1991 Southland Conference men's basketball tournament =

Basketball Tournament March 1991 in Louisiana

- Classification: Division I
- Season: 1990–91
- Teams: 4
- Site: Fant-Ewing Coliseum; Monroe, Louisiana
- Champions: Northeast Louisiana (3rd title)
- Winning coach: Mike Vining (3rd title)
- MVP: Anthony Jones (2nd) (Northeast Louisiana)

1990–91 Southland Conference men's basketball standings
	Conf.				Overall
Team	W		L	PCT	W		L	PCT
NE Louisiana †	13	–	1	.929	25	–	8	.758
UT Arlington	11	–	3	.786	20	–	9	.690
North Texas State	11	–	3	.786	17	–	13	.567
Stephen F. Austin	6	–	8	.429	11	–	17	.393
Sam Houston State	5	–	9	.357	7	–	20	.259
Texas State	4	–	10	.286	10	–	17	.370
McNeese State	4	–	10	.286	8	–	19	.296
Northwestern State	2	–	12	.143	6	–	22	.214
† 1991 Southland Conference tournament winner Rankings from AP Poll

The 1991 Southland Conference men's basketball tournament was held February 28–March 1 at Fant-Ewing Coliseum in Monroe, Louisiana.

Northeast Louisiana defeated Texas–Arlington in the championship game, 87–60, to win their second Southland men's basketball tournament.

The Indians received a bid to the 1991 NCAA Tournament as the #15 seed in the Midwest region.

== Format ==
Just four of the eight conference members participated in the tournament field. They were seeded based on regular season conference records, with tournament play beginning with the semifinal round.

Games in the quarterfinal round were played at the home court of the higher-seeded team. All remaining games were played at Fant-Ewing Coliseum in Monroe, Louisiana.

== Bracket ==
Semifinals; February 28
1	NE Louisiana	75
4	Stephen F. Austin	63
3	Texas–Arlington	97
2	North Texas State	91

Championship; March 1
1	NE Louisiana	87
3	Texas-Arlington	60
