= 1991 Atlantic 10 men's basketball tournament =

- Classification: Division I
- Season: 1990–91
- Teams: 10
- Site: The Palestra; Philadelphia and Rec Hall; University Park, Pennsylvania
- Champions: Penn State (1st title)
- Winning coach: Bruce Parkhill (1st title)
- MVP: Freddie Barnes (Penn State)

1990–91 Atlantic 10 men's basketball standings
	Conf.				Overall
Team	W		L	PCT	W		L	PCT
Rutgers	14	–	4	.778	19	–	10	.655
Temple	13	–	5	.722	24	–	10	.706
Penn State †	10	–	8	.556	21	–	11	.656
George Washington	10	–	8	.556	19	–	12	.613
UMass	10	–	8	.556	20	–	13	.606
West Virginia	10	–	8	.556	17	–	14	.548
Duquesne	10	–	8	.556	13	–	15	.464
Saint Joseph's	7	–	11	.389	13	–	17	.433
Rhode Island	6	–	12	.333	11	–	17	.393
St. Bonaventure	0	–	18	.000	5	–	23	.179
† 1991 Atlantic 10 Tournament winner Rankings from AP Poll

The 1991 Atlantic 10 men's basketball tournament was played from March 2 to March 4, 1991, and March 7, 1991, at the Palestra in Philadelphia, Pennsylvania, except for the final that was played at Rec Hall in University Park, Pennsylvania. The winner was named champion of the Atlantic 10 Conference and received an automatic bid to the 1991 NCAA Men's Division I Basketball Tournament. Penn State University won the tournament. Temple and Rutgers also received bids to the NCAA Tournament. Freddie Barnes of Penn State was named the tournament's Most Outstanding Player. The top six teams in the conference received first-round byes.

Penn State departed the Atlantic 10 following this season. The Nittany Lions played an independent schedule in 1991-92, then joined the Big Ten on July 1, 1992.

== Bracket ==
First round Saturday, March 2 Palestra, Philadelphia, PA
8	Saint Joseph's	82*
9	Rhode Island	65
7	West Virginia	93
10	St. Bonaventure	86

Quarterfinals; Sunday, March 3 Palestra
1	Rutgers	87
8	Saint Joseph's	90*
4	George Washington	84*
5	Massachusetts	83
2	Temple	56
7	West Virginia	53
3	Penn State	83
6	Duquesne	64

Semifinals; Monday, March 4 Palestra
8	Saint Joseph's	82
4	George Washington	84*
2	Temple	50
3	Penn State	52

Final; Thursday, March 7 Rec Hall, University Park, PA
4	George Washington	75
3	Penn State	81

* - Overtime
