= 1990–91 Northeast Louisiana Indians men's basketball team =

American college basketball season

1990–91 Northeast Louisiana Indians men's basketball

Southland Regular season champions Southland tournament champions

NCAA tournament
- Conference: Southland Conference
- Record: 25–8 (13–1 Southland)
- Head coach: Mike Vining (10th season)
- Home arena: Fant–Ewing Coliseum

1990–91 Southland Conference men's basketball standings
| | Conf. | | | | Overall |
| Team | W | | L | PCT | W | | L | PCT |
|---|---|---|---|---|---|---|---|---|
| NE Louisiana † | 13 | – | 1 | .929 | 25 | – | 8 | .758 |
| UT Arlington | 11 | – | 3 | .786 | 20 | – | 9 | .690 |
| North Texas State | 11 | – | 3 | .786 | 17 | – | 13 | .567 |
| Stephen F. Austin | 6 | – | 8 | .429 | 11 | – | 17 | .393 |
| Sam Houston State | 5 | – | 9 | .357 | 7 | – | 20 | .259 |
| Southwest Texas State | 4 | – | 10 | .286 | 10 | – | 17 | .370 |
| McNeese State | 4 | – | 10 | .286 | 8 | – | 19 | .296 |
| Northwestern State | 2 | – | 12 | .143 | 6 | – | 22 | .214 |
† 1991 Southland Conference tournament winner Rankings from AP Poll

The 1990–91 Northeast Louisiana Indians men's basketball team represented the Northeast Louisiana University in the 1990–91 NCAA Division I men's basketball season. The Indiana, led by head coach Mike Vining, played their home games at Fant–Ewing Coliseum in Monroe, Louisiana, as members of the Southland Conference. They finished the season 25–8, 13–1 in Southland play to win the regular season conference title. They followed that success by winning the Southland tournament to earn an automatic bid to the NCAA tournament as No. 15 seed in the Midwest region. Northeast Louisiana fell to No. 2 seed and eventual national champion Duke in the opening round, 102–73.

== Roster ==
1990–91 Northeast Louisiana Indians men's basketball team
Players
Coaches

| Pos. | # | Name | Height | Weight | Year | Hometown |
|---|---|---|---|---|---|---|
| F | | Carlos Funchess | 6 ft 3 in (1.91 m) | — | Sr |
| F | | Anthony Jones | 6 ft 3 in (1.91 m) | — | Sr |

Head coach

- Mike Vining

Assistant coach(es)

Legend

- (C) Team captain
- (S) Suspended
- (I) Ineligible
- (W) Walk-on
- Injured
- Current redshirt

== Schedule and results ==
| Date time, TV | Rank^{#} | Opponent^{#} | Result | Record | Site (attendance) city, state |
Regular season
| Nov 23, 1990* | | vs. Southwest Missouri State | L 73–82 | 0–1 | |
| Nov 25, 1990* | | vs. Southwestern Louisiana | L 72–75 | 0–2 | |
| Nov 30, 1990* | | US International | W 98–72 | 1–2 | Fant–Ewing Coliseum; Monroe, Louisiana |
| Dec 8, 1990* | | Grambling State | W 104–77 | 3–3 | |
| Dec 15, 1990* | | at No. 22 Southern Miss | L 72–84 | 3–4 | Reed Green Coliseum; Hattiesburg, Mississippi |
| Dec 18, 1990* | | at Louisiana Tech | L 82–94 | 3–5 | Thomas Assembly Center; Ruston, Louisiana |
| Dec 31, 1990* | | at No. 2 Arkansas | L 92–114 | 3–6 | Barnhill Arena; Fayetteville, Arkansas |
| Jan 5, 1991* | | at Nicholls State | W 102–95 | 4–6 | Stopher Gymnasium; Thibodaux, Louisiana |
| Jan 7, 1991* | | at Southeastern Louisiana | W 73–67 | 5–6 | University Center; Hammond, Louisiana |
| Jan 14, 1991 | | at Northwestern State | W 66–65 | 8–6 | |
| Jan 28, 1991* | | Louisiana Tech | W 100–89 | 12–7 | Fant–Ewing Coliseum; Monroe, Louisiana |
| Jan 31, 1991* | | Nicholls State | W 116–94 | 13–7 | Fant–Ewing Coliseum; Monroe, Louisiana |
| Feb 2, 1991 | | Northwestern State | W 95–76 | 14–7 | Fant–Ewing Coliseum; Monroe, Louisiana |
| Feb 4, 1991* | | Southeastern Louisiana | W 81–67 | 15–7 | Fant–Ewing Coliseum; Monroe, Louisiana |
| Feb 25, 1991* | | at Grambling State | W 102–71 | 22–7 | Tiger Memorial Gym; Grambling, Louisiana |
Southland tournament
| Feb 28, 1991* | | Stephen F. Austin; Semifinal | W 75–63 | 23–7 | Fant-Ewing Coliseum; Monroe, Louisiana |
| Mar 1, 1991* | | Texas-Arlington; Championship Game | W 87–60 | 24–7 | Fant-Ewing Coliseum; Monroe, Louisiana |
NCAA Tournament
| Mar 3, 1991* | | Florida A&M; Play-in Game | W 87–63 | 25–7 | Fant-Ewing Coliseum; Monroe, Louisiana |
| Mar 16, 1990* | (15 MW) | vs. (2 MW) No. 6 Duke; First Round | L 73–102 | 25–8 | Hubert H. Humphrey Metrodome; Minneapolis, Minnesota |
*Non-conference game. ^{#}Rankings from AP poll. (#) Tournament seedings in parentheses. MW=Midwest. All times are in Central.
