= 1990–91 Rutgers Scarlet Knights men's basketball team =

American college basketball season

1990–91 Rutgers Scarlet Knights men's basketball

Atlantic-10 Regular-season champions

NCAA tournament
- Conference: Atlantic-10 Conference
- Record: 19–10 (14–4 A-10)
- Head coach: Bob Wenzel (3rd season)
- Home arena: Louis Brown Athletic Center

1990–91 Atlantic 10 men's basketball standings
| | Conf. | | | | Overall |
| Team | W | | L | PCT | W | | L | PCT |
|---|---|---|---|---|---|---|---|---|
| Rutgers | 14 | – | 4 | .778 | 19 | – | 10 | .655 |
| Temple | 13 | – | 5 | .722 | 24 | – | 10 | .706 |
| Penn State † | 10 | – | 8 | .556 | 21 | – | 11 | .656 |
| George Washington | 10 | – | 8 | .556 | 19 | – | 12 | .613 |
| UMass | 10 | – | 8 | .556 | 20 | – | 13 | .606 |
| West Virginia | 10 | – | 8 | .556 | 17 | – | 14 | .548 |
| Duquesne | 10 | – | 8 | .556 | 13 | – | 15 | .464 |
| Saint Joseph's | 7 | – | 11 | .389 | 13 | – | 17 | .433 |
| Rhode Island | 6 | – | 12 | .333 | 11 | – | 17 | .393 |
| St. Bonaventure | 0 | – | 18 | .000 | 5 | – | 23 | .179 |
† 1991 Atlantic 10 Tournament winner Rankings from AP Poll

The 1990–91 Rutgers Scarlet Knights men's basketball team represented Rutgers University in the 1990–91 NCAA Division I men's basketball season. The head coach was Bob Wenzel, then in his third season with the Scarlet Knights. The team played its home games in Louis Brown Athletic Center in Piscataway Township, New Jersey, and was a member of the Atlantic-10 Conference. The Scarlet Knights finished atop the conference's regular season standings, and would receive an at-large bid to the NCAA tournament. Rutgers fell to Arizona State, 79–76, in the opening round. The first loss of the season came at the hands of Princeton.

== Roster ==
1990–91 Rutgers Scarlet Knights men's basketball team
Players
Coaches

| Pos. | # | Name | Height | Weight | Year | Hometown |
|---|---|---|---|---|---|---|
| G | | Tom Savage | 6 ft 5 in (1.96 m) | — | Sr |
| SG | 69 | Eric Dimetrosky | 6 ft 6 in (1.98 m) | 210 lb (95 kg) | Jr |
| PG | 23 | Dan Baumlin | 5 ft 8 in (1.73 m) | 265 lb (120 kg) | Sr |
| SF | 5 | Pee Santi | 5 ft 11 in (1.8 m) | 200 lb (91 kg) | Sr |
| PF | 31 | Keith Hughes | 6 ft 8 in (2.03 m) | 230 lb (104 kg) | Sr | Carteret, NJ |
| SG | 24 | Aedan Hill | 6 ft 3 in (1.91 m) | 265 lb (120 kg) | Sr |
| SG | 3 | JB Bennett | 6 ft 1 in (1.85 m) | 215 lb (98 kg) | Sr |
| G | 7 | Kevin Carino | 5 ft 1 in (1.55 m) | 135 lb (61 kg) | Sr |
| | 5 | Lav Laviano | 6 ft 6 in (1.98 m) | 235 lb (107 kg) | Sr |
| PG | 4 | Sean O’Neill | 6 ft 10 in (2.08 m) | 213 lb (97 kg) | Sr |
| G | 0 | Geo Baker | 5 ft 8 in (1.73 m) | 265 lb (120 kg) | Sr |

Head coach

- Bob Wenzel (Rutgers)

Assistant coach(es)

Legend

- (C) Team captain
- (S) Suspended
- (I) Ineligible
- (W) Walk-on
- Injured
- Current redshirt

== Schedule and results ==
| Date time, TV | Rank^{#} | Opponent^{#} | Result | Record | Site (attendance) city, state |
Regular season
| Nov 27, 1990* | | No. 23 Missouri | W 68–60 | 1–0 | Louis Brown Athletic Center; Piscataway, New Jersey |
| Dec 11, 1990 | | at UMass | W 67–65 | | Curry Hicks Cage; Amherst, Massachusetts |
| Dec 15, 1990* | | Princeton | L 45–58 | | Louis Brown Athletic Center; Piscataway, New Jersey |
| Dec 22, 1990* | | at Seton Hall | L 76–90 | | Brendan Byrne Arena; East Rutherford, New Jersey |
| Dec 29, 1990* | | vs. BYU; ECAC Holiday Festival | W 85–70 | | Madison Square Garden; New York, New York |
| Jan 8, 1991 | | at Temple | L 62–83 | | McGonigle Hall; Philadelphia, Pennsylvania |
| Jan 12, 1991 | | at West Virginia | L 69–87 | | WVU Coliseum; Morgantown, West Virginia |
| Jan 19, 1991 | | West Virginia | W 75–71 | | Louis Brown Athletic Center; Piscataway, New Jersey |
| Jan 22, 1991* | | at Notre Dame | W 62–52 | | Joyce Center; South Bend, Indiana |
| Jan 28, 1991 | | at Penn State | W 79–78 | | Rec Hall; University Park, Pennsylvania |
| Feb 1, 1991 | | Temple | L 62–83 | | Louis Brown Athletic Center; Piscataway, New Jersey |
| Feb 3, 1991* | | at No. 1 UNLV | L 73–115 | | Thomas & Mack Center (18,954); Las Vegas, Nevada |
| Feb 24, 1991 | | UMass | W 103–96 ^{OT} | | Louis Brown Athletic Center; Piscataway, New Jersey |
| Feb 27, 1991 | | Penn State | W 92–70 | | Louis Brown Athletic Center; Piscataway, New Jersey |
Atlantic-10 tournament
| Mar 3, 1991* | | at Saint Joseph's; Quarterfinal | L 87–90 ^{OT} | 19–9 | Palestra; Philadelphia, Pennsylvania |
NCAA tournament
| Mar 15, 1991* | (9 SE) | vs. (8 SE) Arizona State; First Round | L 76–79 | 19–10 | The Omni; Atlanta, Georgia |
*Non-conference game. ^{#}Rankings from AP poll. (#) Tournament seedings in parentheses. All times are in Eastern Time.

== Awards and honors ==
- Keith Hughes – Atlantic 10 Player of the Year
