= 1990–91 Louisiana Tech Bulldogs basketball team =

American college basketball season

1990–91 Louisiana Tech Bulldogs basketball

American South tournament champions

NCAA tournament, first round
- Conference: American South Conference
- Record: 21–10 (8–4 American South)
- Head coach: Jerry Loyd (2nd season)
- Assistant coach: Kyle Keller (1st season)
- Home arena: Thomas Assembly Center

1990–91 American South Conference men's basketball standings
	Conf.				Overall
Team	W		L	PCT	W		L	PCT
New Orleans	9	–	3	.750	23	–	8	.742
Arkansas State	9	–	3	.750	23	–	9	.719
Louisiana Tech †	8	–	4	.667	21	–	10	.677
Southwestern Louisiana	6	–	6	.500	21	–	10	.677
Lamar	4	–	8	.333	15	–	13	.536
UCF	3	–	9	.250	10	–	17	.370
Texas–Pan American	3	–	9	.250	7	–	21	.250
† 1991 American South tournament winner Rankings from AP Poll

The 1990–91 Louisiana Tech Bulldogs basketball team represented Louisiana Tech University in Ruston, Louisiana as members of the American South Conference during the 1990–91 season. The Bulldogs were led by head coach Jerry Loyd. Louisiana Tech finished third in the American South regular season standings (8–4), but would earn an automatic berth in the NCAA tournament by winning the conference tournament championship.

== Roster ==
1990–91 Louisiana Tech Bulldogs men's basketball team
Players
Coaches

Pos.	#	Name	Height	Weight	Year	Hometown
F	15	Anthony Dade	6 ft 6 in (1.98 m)	225 lb (102 kg)	Jr
C	42	P. J. Brown	6 ft 11 in (2.11 m)	225 lb (102 kg)	Jr	Winnfield, Louisiana

Head coach

- Jerry Loyd

Assistant coach(es)

- Kyle Keller

Legend

- (C) Team captain
- (S) Suspended
- (I) Ineligible
- (W) Walk-on
- Injured
- Current redshirt

== Schedule and results ==
Date time, TV	Rank^{#}	Opponent^{#}	Result	Record	Site city, state
Regular season
Nov 23, 1990*		vs. TCU	W 82–71	1–0	Shreveport, Louisiana
Nov 24, 1990*		at Centenary	W 94–89	2–0	Shreveport, Louisiana
Nov 29, 1990*		at McNeese State	W 73–64	3–0	Lake Charles, Louisiana
Dec 1, 1990*		at Arkansas–Little Rock	W 68–63	4–0	
Dec 3, 1990*		Tulsa	W 78–66	5–0	Thomas Assembly Center; Ruston, Louisiana
Dec 5, 1990*		at No. 3 Arkansas	L 97–114	5–1	Barnhill Arena; Fayetteville, Arkansas
Dec 10, 1990*		at Sam Houston State	W 95–72	6–1	
Dec 13, 1990*		at Oklahoma State	L 58–89	6–2	Gallagher-Iba Arena; Stillwater, Oklahoma
Dec 18, 1990*		Northeast Louisiana	W 94–82	7–2	Thomas Assembly Center; Ruston, Louisiana
Dec 26, 1990*		at Creighton	L 84–87	7–3	Omaha Civic Auditorium; Omaha, Nebraska
Dec 28, 1990*		vs. Coastal Carolina; Oldsmobile Spartan Classic Semifinals	W 86–81	8–3	Breslin Student Events Center; East Lansing, Michigan
Dec 29, 1990*		at No. 25 Michigan State; Oldsmobile Spartan Classic Championship	L 62–77	8–4	Breslin Student Events Center; East Lansing, Michigan
Jan 12, 1991		New Orleans	L 68–72		Thomas Assembly Center; Ruston, Louisiana
Jan 28, 1991*		at Northeast Louisiana	L 89–100		Fant–Ewing Coliseum; Monroe, Louisiana
Feb 9, 1991		at No. 21 New Orleans	W 68–63		Lakefront Arena; New Orleans, Louisiana
American South Conference tournament
Mar 1, 1991*		vs. UCF; Quarterfinal	W 89–57	19–9	Lakefront Arena; New Orleans, Louisiana
Mar 2, 1991*		vs. Arkansas State; Semifinal	W 58–56	20–9	Lakefront Arena; New Orleans, Louisiana
Mar 3, 1991*		at New Orleans; Championship Game	W 61–56	21–9	Lakefront Arena; New Orleans, Louisiana
NCAA tournament
Mar 15, 1991*	(12 SE)	vs. (5 SE) Wake Forest; First Round	L 65–71	21–10	The Omni; Atlanta, Georgia
*Non-conference game. ^{#}Rankings from AP Poll. (#) Tournament seedings in parentheses. SE=Southeast.
