= 1990–91 Penn State Nittany Lions basketball team =

American college basketball season

1990–91 Penn State Nittany Lions basketball

A-10 tournament champions

NCAA tournament, second round
- Conference: Atlantic 10
- Record: 21–11 (10–8 A-10)
- Head coach: Bruce Parkhill (8th season)
- Assistant coach: Jerry Dunn
- Home arena: Rec Hall

1990–91 Atlantic 10 men's basketball standings
| | Conf. | | | | Overall |
| Team | W | | L | PCT | W | | L | PCT |
|---|---|---|---|---|---|---|---|---|
| Rutgers | 14 | – | 4 | .778 | 19 | – | 10 | .655 |
| Temple | 13 | – | 5 | .722 | 24 | – | 10 | .706 |
| Penn State † | 10 | – | 8 | .556 | 21 | – | 11 | .656 |
| George Washington | 10 | – | 8 | .556 | 19 | – | 12 | .613 |
| UMass | 10 | – | 8 | .556 | 20 | – | 13 | .606 |
| West Virginia | 10 | – | 8 | .556 | 17 | – | 14 | .548 |
| Duquesne | 10 | – | 8 | .556 | 13 | – | 15 | .464 |
| Saint Joseph's | 7 | – | 11 | .389 | 13 | – | 17 | .433 |
| Rhode Island | 6 | – | 12 | .333 | 11 | – | 17 | .393 |
| St. Bonaventure | 0 | – | 18 | .000 | 5 | – | 23 | .179 |
† 1991 Atlantic 10 Tournament winner Rankings from AP Poll

The 1990–91 Penn State Nittany Lions basketball team represented Pennsylvania State University as a member of the Atlantic-10 Conference during the 1990–91 season. The team was led by head coach Bruce Parkhill and played its home games at Rec Hall in University Park, Pennsylvania. The Nittany Lions won the A-10 tournament to gain an automatic bid to the NCAA tournament. After upsetting UCLA in the first round, Penn State was beaten in overtime by Eastern Michigan in the second round. Penn State finished the season with an overall record of 21–11 (10–8 A-10).

This was Penn State's final season in the Atlantic 10. The Nittany Lions played an independent schedule in 1991–92, then joined the Big Ten on July 1, 1992. They had been voted into the Big Ten Conference on June 4, 1990.

== Roster ==
1990–91 Penn State Nittany Lions men's basketball team
| Players | Coaches |
|---|---|
| Pos. / # / Name / Height / Weight / Year / Hometown; F / / DeRon Hayes / 6 ft 6 in (1.98 m) / — | Head coach: Bruce Parkhill; Assistant coach(es) Legend: (C) Team captain; (S) Suspended; (I) Ineligible; (W) Walk-on; Injured; Current redshirt |

== Schedule and results ==
| Date time, TV | Rank^{#} | Opponent^{#} | Result | Record | Site city, state |
Regular season
| Nov 24, 1990* | | Drexel | W 86–83 | 1–0 | Rec Hall; University Park, Pennsylvania |
| Nov 27, 1990* | | Miami (FL) | W 93–67 | 2–0 | Rec Hall (6,574); University Park, Pennsylvania |
| Dec 5, 1990* | | Illinois | W 78–68 | 4–1 | Rec Hall (7,347); University Park, Pennsylvania |
| Dec 18, 1990 | | at Temple | L 63–67 | 5–2 | McGonigle Hall; Philadelphia, Pennsylvania |
| Jan 3, 1991 | | UMass | W 65–64 | 7–3 | Rec Hall; University Park, Pennsylvania |
| Jan 10, 1991 | | West Virginia | W 90–88 | 9–4 | Rec Hall; University Park, Pennsylvania |
| Jan 25, 1991* | | at Miami (FL) | W 69–57 | 12–5 | Miami Arena (2,714); Miami, Florida |
| Jan 28, 1991 | | Rutgers | L 78–79 | 12–6 | Rec Hall; University Park, Pennsylvania |
| Jan 31, 1991 | | West Virginia | W 66–63 | 13–6 | WVU Coliseum; Morgantown, West Virginia |
| Feb 13, 1991 | | Temple | L 59–69 | 15–8 | Rec Hall; University Park, Pennsylvania |
| Feb 16, 1991 | | at UMass | L 64–73 | 15–9 | Curry Hicks Cage; Amherst, Massachusetts |
| Feb 27, 1991 | | at Rutgers | L 70–92 | 17–10 | Louis Brown Athletic Center; Piscataway, New Jersey |
Atlantic 10 Tournament
| Mar 3, 1991* | (3) | vs. (6) Duquesne; Quarterfinals | W 83–64 | 18–10 | Palestra; Philadelphia, Pennsylvania |
| Mar 4, 1991* | (3) | at (2) Temple; Semifinals | W 52–50 | 19–10 | Palestra; Philadelphia, Pennsylvania |
| Mar 7, 1991* | (3) | (4) George Washington; Championship | W 81–75 | 20–10 | Rec Hall; University Park, Pennsylvania |
NCAA Tournament
| Mar 15, 1991* | (13 E) | vs. (4 E) No. 16 UCLA; First Round | W 74–69 | 21–10 | Carrier Dome; Syracuse, New York |
| Mar 17, 1991* | (13 E) | vs. (12 E) Eastern Michigan; Second Round | L 68–71 ^{OT} | 21–11 | Carrier Dome; Syracuse, New York |
*Non-conference game. ^{#}Rankings from AP poll. (#) Tournament seedings in parentheses. E=East. All times are in Eastern Time.

– Source:
