= 1990–91 Ohio Bobcats men's basketball team =

American college basketball season

1990–91 Ohio Bobcats men's basketball
- Conference: Mid-American Conference
- Record: 16–12 (9–7 MAC)
- Head coach: Larry Hunter (2nd season)
- Assistant coaches: David Greer; Mike Elfers
- Home arena: Convocation Center

1990–91 Mid-American Conference men's basketball standings
	Conf.				Overall
Team	W		L	PCT	W		L	PCT
Eastern Michigan †	13	–	3	.813	26	–	7	.788
Miami (OH)	10	–	6	.625	16	–	12	.571
Ball State	10	–	6	.625	21	–	10	.677
Bowling Green	9	–	7	.563	17	–	13	.567
Ohio	9	–	7	.563	16	–	12	.571
Central Michigan	8	–	8	.500	14	–	14	.500
Toledo	7	–	9	.438	17	–	16	.515
Kent State	4	–	12	.250	10	–	18	.357
Western Michigan	2	–	14	.125	5	–	22	.185
† 1991 Mid-American Conference tournament winner Rankings from AP Poll

The 1990–91 Ohio Bobcats men's basketball team represented Ohio University in the college basketball season of 1990–91. The team was coached by Larry Hunter and played their home games at the Convocation Center.

== Roster ==
1990–91 Ohio Bobcats men's basketball team
Players
Coaches

Pos.	#	Name	Height	Weight	Year	Hometown
F	41	Dan Aloi	6 ft 7 in (2.01 m)	225 lb (102 kg)	Jr	Ellwood City, PA
C	31	Rick Hoffman	6 ft 11 in (2.11 m)	195 lb (88 kg)	Jr	Findlay, OH
G	24	Tom Jamerson	6 ft 4 in (1.93 m)	210 lb (95 kg)	Jr	Cuyahoga Falls, OH
G	23	Nate Craig	6 ft 0 in (1.83 m)	175 lb (79 kg)	Jr	Dayton, OH
F	33	Lewis Geter	6 ft 8 in (2.03 m)	190 lb (86 kg)	Jr	Columbus, OH
G	10	Dedrick Jenkins	5 ft 10 in (1.78 m)	150 lb (68 kg)	Jr	Waterloo, IA
C	44	Robert Stark	6 ft 9 in (2.06 m)	235 lb (107 kg)	Jr	Sumter, SC
F	34	Steve Barnes	6 ft 6 in (1.98 m)	180 lb (82 kg)	So	Cleveland, OH
G	12	Jay Barry	6 ft 2 in (1.88 m)	170 lb (77 kg)	So	Oxford, OH
F	20	Chad Gill	6 ft 6 in (1.98 m)	180 lb (82 kg)	So	Columbus, OH
G	4	Chad Estis	6 ft 0 in (1.83 m)	185 lb (84 kg)	Fr	Aurora, OH
G	15	Alonzo Motley	6 ft 4 in (1.93 m)	200 lb (91 kg)	Fr	Dayton, OH
G	22	Rush Floyd	6 ft 1 in (1.85 m)	185 lb (84 kg)	Fr	Pickerington, OH

Head coach

- Larry Hunter

Assistant coach(es)

- David Greer
- Mike Elfers

Legend

- (C) Team captain
- (S) Suspended
- (I) Ineligible
- (W) Walk-on
- Injured
- Current redshirt

== Schedule ==
Date time, TV	Rank^{#}	Opponent^{#}	Result	Record	Site (attendance) city, state
Non-conference regular season
11/26/1990*		Evansville	W 75–68	1–0	Convocation Center (2,214); Athens, OH
12/1/1990*		at Rider	L 64–82	1–1	Alumni Gymnasium (1,357); Lawrenceville, NJ
12/8/1990*		at Auburn	L 65–75	1–2	Beard–Eaves–Memorial Coliseum (5,341); Auburn, AL
12/10/1990*		Mercer	W 74–69	2–2	Porter Gym (225); Macon, GA
12/13/1990*		at Marshall	L 68–70	2–3	Cam Henderson Center (5,492); Huntington, WV
12/15/1990*		Charleston (WV)	W 93–61	3–3	Convocation Center (2,007); Athens, OH
12/17/1990*		Youngstown State	W 85–70	4–3	Convocation Center (2,647); Athens, OH
12/23/1990*		at Colorado State	W 62–51	5–3	Moby Arena (7,211); Fort Collins, CO
12/27/1990*		vs. North Texas; Hoosier Classic	W 77–74	6–3	Market Square Arena (12,879); Indianapolis, IN
12/28/1990*	No. 5	vs. Indiana; Hoosier Classic	L 64–102	6–4	Market Square Arena (14,277); Indianapolis, IN
1/2/1991*		Wright State	W 75–56	7–4	Convocation Center (2,877); Athens, OH
MAC regular season
1/5/1991		at Central Michigan	L 42–70	7–5	McGuirk Arena (2,801); Mount Pleasant, MI
1/9/1991		Bowling Green	L 53–67	7–6	Convocation Center (6,130); Athens, OH
1/12/1991		at Eastern Michigan	L 68–78	7–7	Bowen Field House (3,523); Ypsilanti, MI
1/16/1991		Toledo	W 74–55	8–7	Convocation Center (3,016); Athens, OH
1/19/1991		at Kent State	W 60–59	9–7	MAC Center (3,135); Kent, OH
1/23/1991		Ball State	L 50–78	9–8	Convocation Center (3,919); Athens, OH
1/26/1991		at Miami (OH)	L 57–70	9–9	Millett Hall (7,012); Oxford, OH
1/30/1991		Western Michigan	W 72–58	10–9	Convocation Center (2,371); Athens, OH
2/2/1991		Central Michigan	W 63–53	11–9	Convocation Center (4,708); Athens, OH
2/6/1991		at Bowling Green	L 55–60	11–10	Anderson Arena (3,716); Bowling Green, OH
2/19/1991		Eastern Michigan	W 60–58	12–10	Convocation Center (6,309); Athens, OH
2/13/1991		at Toledo	W 68–55	13–10	Savage Arena (5,463); Toledo, OH
2/16/1991		Kent State	W 52–49	14–10	Convocation Center (4,092); Athens, OH
2/20/1991		at Ball State	W 63–60	15–10	Irving Gymnasium (6,860); Muncie, IN
2/23/1991		Miami (OH)	W 83–71	16–10	Convocation Center (8,439); Athens, OH
2/27/1991		at Western Michigan	L 61–63	16–11	University Arena (1,092); Kalamazoo, MI
MAC tournament
3/8/1991		vs. Bowling Green	L 58–66	16–12	Cobo Center (5,510); Detroit, MI
*Non-conference game. ^{#}Rankings from AP Poll. (#) Tournament seedings in parentheses. All times are in Eastern Time.

== Statistics ==
=== Team statistics ===
Final 1990–91 statistics

Record	Ohio	OPP
Scoring	1841	1848
Scoring Average	65.75	66.00
Field goals – Att	652–1464	628–1344
3-pt. Field goals – Att	123–320	107–297
Free throws – Att	414–579	485–686
Rebounds	893	836
Assists	380	349
Turnovers	419	457
Steals	210	195
Blocked Shots	47	87

=== Player statistics ===
			Minutes		Scoring		Total FGs			3-point FGs			Free-Throws			Rebounds								
Player	GP	GS	Tot	Avg	Pts	Avg	FG	FGA	Pct	3FG	3FA	Pct	FT	FTA	Pct	Off	Def	Tot	Avg	A	PF	TO	Stl	Blk
Lewis Geter	28	-	-	-	508	18.1	173	414	0.418	25	78	0.321	137	158	0.867	-	-	191	6.8	68	0	0	34	11
Steve Barnes	28	-	-	-	280	10.0	112	218	0.514	0	1	0.000	56	93	0.602	-	-	121	4.3	46	0	0	21	12
Dan Aloi	18	-	-	-	272	15.1	97	188	0.516	17	36	0.472	61	73	0.836	-	-	101	5.6	23	0	0	16	2
Nate Craig	28	-	-	-	226	8.1	74	183	0.404	24	66	0.364	54	90	0.600	-	-	99	3.5	105	0	0	64	5
Chad Gill	28	-	-	-	129	4.6	43	103	0.417	3	10	0.300	40	60	0.667	-	-	100	3.6	21	0	0	13	8
Rush Floyd	25	-	-	-	128	5.1	43	97	0.443	28	60	0.467	14	18	0.778	-	-	42	1.7	13	0	0	6	4
Tom Jamerson	28	-	-	-	110	3.9	38	92	0.413	18	39	0.462	16	18	0.889	-	-	48	1.7	41	0	0	21	1
Dedrick Jenkins	27	-	-	-	72	2.7	25	73	0.342	6	21	0.286	16	27	0.593	-	-	41	1.5	46	0	0	26	0
Robert Stark	25	-	-	-	57	2.3	23	39	0.590	0	0	0.000	11	26	0.423	-	-	32	1.3	3	0	0	2	4
Alonzo Motley	20	-	-	-	41	2.1	18	37	0.486	0	0	0.000	5	9	0.556	-	-	17	0.9	7	0	0	5	0
Jay Barry	14	-	-	-	7	0.5	1	6	0.167	1	4	0.250	4	7	0.571	-	-	6	0.4	5	0	0	1	0
Chad Estis	13	-	-	-	7	0.5	3	10	0.300	1	5	0.200	0	0	0.000	-	-	3	0.2	2	0	0	1	0
Rick Hoffman	7	-	-	-	4	0.6	2	4	0.500	0	0	0.000	0	0	0.000	-	-	2	0.3	0	0	0	0	0
Total	28	-	-	-	1841	65.8	652	1464	0.445	123	320	0.384	414	579	0.715			893	31.9	380	586	419	210	47
Opponents	28	-	-	-	1848	66.0	628	1344	0.467	107	297	0.360	485	686	0.707			836	29.9	349	518	457	195	87

Legend
GP	Games played	GS	Games started	Avg	Average per game
FG	Field-goals made	FGA	Field-goal attempts	Off	Offensive rebounds
Def	Defensive rebounds	A	Assists	TO	Turnovers
Blk	Blocks	Stl	Steals	High	Team high
