= 1991 MEAC men's basketball tournament =

- Classification: Division I
- Season: 1990–91
- Teams: 9
- Site: Campus sites
- Finals site: Norfolk Scope; Norfolk, Virginia
- Champions: Florida A&M (1st title)
- Winning coach: Willie Booker (1st title)
- MVP: Kenneth Davis (Florida A&M)

1990–91 MEAC men's basketball standings
	Conf.				Overall
Team	W		L	PCT	W		L	PCT
Coppin State	14	–	2	.875	19	–	11	.633
Delaware State	10	–	6	.625	19	–	11	.633
North Carolina A&T	10	–	6	.625	17	–	10	.630
South Carolina State	10	–	6	.625	13	–	15	.464
Florida A&M †	9	–	7	.563	17	–	14	.548
Howard	7	–	9	.438	8	–	20	.286
Morgan State	6	–	10	.375	7	–	22	.241
Maryland Eastern Shore	3	–	13	.188	5	–	23	.179
Bethune–Cookman	3	–	13	.188	5	–	24	.172
† 1991 MEAC tournament winner Rankings from AP Poll

The 1991 Mid-Eastern Athletic Conference men's basketball tournament took place February 27–March 2, 1991, at Norfolk Scope in Norfolk, Virginia. Number five seed Florida A&M defeated three seed Delaware State, 84–80 in the championship game, to win its first MEAC Tournament title.

The Rattlers participated in one of three play-in games to the 1991 NCAA tournament. NE Louisiana defeated Florida A&M, so Florida A&M did not participate in the NCAA Tournament.

== Format ==
All nine conference members participated, with play beginning in the first round. The top seven teams received byes to the quarterfinal round. Teams were seeded based on their regular season conference record.

== Bracket ==
First round February 27
8	Bethune–Cookman	81
9	Maryland Eastern Shore	71

Quarterfinals; February 28
1	Coppin State	92
8	Bethune–Cookman	67
4	North Carolina A&T	77
5	Florida A&M	87
3	Delaware State	95
6	Howard	93
2	South Carolina State	72
7	Morgan State	73

Semifinals; March 1
1	Coppin State	70
5	Florida A&M	74
3	Delaware State	93
7	Morgan State	78

Final; March 2
5	Florida A&M	84
3	Delaware State	80
