= 1990–91 Coastal Carolina Chanticleers men's basketball team =

American college basketball season

1990–91 Coastal Carolina Chanticleers men's basketball

Big South Regular Season Champions Big South tournament champions

NCAA tournament
- Conference: Big South
- Record: 24–8 (13–1 Big South)
- Head coach: Russ Bergman
- Assistant coaches: Mike Selvy; Gary Leiner; Mike Murphy
- Home arena: Kimbel Arena

1990–91 Big South Conference men's basketball standings
	Conf.				Overall
Team	W		L	PCT	W		L	PCT
Coastal Carolina †	13	–	1	.929	24	–	8	.750
Radford	12	–	2	.857	22	–	7	.759
Augusta State	9	–	5	.643	14	–	16	.467
Davidson	6	–	8	.429	10	–	19	.345
Winthrop	5	–	9	.357	8	–	20	.286
UNC Asheville	4	–	10	.286	8	–	20	.286
Charleston Southern	4	–	10	.286	9	–	19	.321
Campbell	3	–	11	.214	9	–	19	.321
† 1991 Big South tournament winner Rankings from AP Poll

The 1990–91 Coastal Carolina Chanticleers men's basketball team represented Coastal Carolina University during the 1990–91 college basketball season. This was head coach Russ Bergman's third season at Coastal Carolina. The Chanticleers competed in the Big South Conference and played their home games at Kimbel Arena. They finished the season 24–8, 13–1 in Big South play to capture the regular season championship. The Chanticleers won the 1991 Big South Conference men's basketball tournament to advance to face Jackson State in a play-in game for the right to advance to the NCAA tournament. Coastal Carolina defeated Jackson state to earn an automatic bid to the 1991 NCAA tournament as No. 15 seed in the Southeast Region, marking the school's first ever appearance in the NCAA tournament. They lost in the first round to Indiana.

== Roster ==
1990–91 Coastal Carolina Chanticleers men's basketball team
Players
Coaches

Pos.	#	Name	Height	Weight	Year	Hometown
G		Robert Dowdell	6 ft 0 in (1.83 m)	—	Sr
		Michael Hopkins	—	—	So
G		Brian Penny	6 ft 4 in (1.93 m)	—	Sr
F	25	Tony Dunkin	6 ft 7 in (2.01 m)	210 lb (95 kg)	So	Rains, South Carolina
C		DuWayne Cheatam	6 ft 10 in (2.08 m)	—	Sr

Head coach

- Russ Bergman

Assistant coach(es)

Legend

- (C) Team captain
- (S) Suspended
- (I) Ineligible
- (W) Walk-on
- Injured
- Current redshirt

== Schedule and results ==
Date time, TV	Rank^{#}	Opponent^{#}	Result	Record	Site (attendance) city, state
Regular season
Nov 24, 1990*		vs. Wright State; CSU/North Coast Tournament	W 83–69	1–0	Wolstein Center; Cleveland, Ohio
Nov 25, 1990*		vs. Princeton; CSU/North Coast Tournament	L 39–42	1–1	Wolstein Center; Cleveland, Ohio
Nov 28, 1990*		College of Charleston	W 56–54	2–1	Kimbel Arena; Conway, South Carolina
Dec 3, 1990*		South Carolina State	W 68–57	3–1	Kimbel Arena; Conway, South Carolina
Dec 6, 1990*		at The Citadel	W 79–71	4–1	McAlister Field House; Charleston, South Carolina
Dec 17, 1990*		at George Mason	W 66–65	5–1	Patriot Center; Fairfax, Virginia
Dec 20, 1990*		at Western Carolina	W 80–74	6–1	Ramsey Center; Cullowhee, North Carolina
Dec 28, 1990*		vs. Louisiana Tech; Spartan Classic	L 81–86	6–2	Breslin Student Events Center; East Lansing, Michigan
Dec 29, 1990*		vs. George Mason; Spartan Classic	L 61–70	6–3	Breslin Student Events Center; East Lansing, Michigan
Jan 7, 1991*		at NC State	L 78–86	6–4	Reynolds Coliseum; Raleigh, North Carolina
Jan 9, 1991*		at UNC Charlotte	L 74–93	6–5	Charlotte Coliseum; Charlotte, North Carolina
Jan 12, 1991		at Davidson	W 55–48	7–5 (1–0)	Belk Arena; Davidson, North Carolina
Jan 14, 1991		Charleston Southern	W 86–70	8–5 (2–0)	Kimbel Arena; Conway, South Carolina
Jan 19, 1991*		at College of Charleston	L 57–60	8–6	F. Mitchell Johnson Arena; Charleston, South Carolina
Jan 21, 1991		Augusta State	W 85–80	9–6 (3–0)	Kimbel Arena; Conway, South Carolina
Jan 24, 1991		at Campbell	W 75–62	10–6 (4–0)	Carter Gymnasium; Buies Creek, North Carolina
Jan 26, 1991		Radford	W 78–76	11–6 (5–0)	Kimbel Arena; Conway, South Carolina
Jan 28, 1991		Winthrop	W 75–58	12–6 (6–0)	Kimbel Arena; Conway, South Carolina
Jan 31, 1991		UNC Asheville	W 84–74	13–6 (7–0)	Kimbel Arena; Conway, South Carolina
Feb 2, 1991*		Youngstown State	W 79–66	14–6	Kimbel Arena; Conway, South Carolina
Feb 4, 1991		at Charleston Southern	W 60–51	15–6 (8–0)	Buccaneer Field House; Charleston, South Carolina
Feb 9, 1991		at Radford	W 84–66	16–6 (9–0)	Donald N. Dedmon Center; Radford, Virginia
Feb 11, 1991		Davidson	W 64–52	17–6 (10–0)	Kimbel Arena; Conway, South Carolina
Feb 14, 1991		at UNC Asheville	W 91–67	18–6 (11–0)	Justice Center; Asheville, North Carolina
Feb 16, 1991		at Augusta State	L 74–75	18–7 (11–1)	George A. Christenberry Fieldhouse; Augusta, Georgia
Feb 20, 1991		at Winthrop	W 59–46	19–7 (12–1)	Winthrop Coliseum; Rock Hill, South Carolina
Feb 23, 1991*		Campbell	W 91–58	20–7 (13–1)	Kimbel Arena; Conway, South Carolina
Big South tournament
Feb 28, 1991*		vs. Campbell; Quarterfinal	W 83–46	21–7	Civic Center of Anderson; Anderson, South Carolina
Mar 1, 1991*		vs. Davidson; Semifinal	W 58–55	22–7	Civic Center of Anderson; Anderson, South Carolina
Mar 2, 1991*		vs. Augusta State; Championship Game	W 89–54	23–7	Civic Center of Anderson; Anderson, South Carolina
NCAA tournament
Mar 3, 1991*		at Jackson State; Play-in Game	W 78–59	24–7	Williams Assembly Center; Jackson, Mississippi
Mar 14, 1991*	(15 SE)	vs. (2 SE) No. 3 Indiana; First Round	L 69–79	24–8	Freedom Hall (18,217); Louisville, Kentucky
*Non-conference game. ^{#}Rankings from AP poll. (#) Tournament seedings in parentheses. SE=Southeast. All times are in Eastern Time Zone.

== Awards and honors ==
- Tony Dunkin – Big South Conference Men's Player of the Year (2nd of 4)
