= Russ Bergman =

American college basketball coach

Biographical details
- Born: September 13, 1947 (age 79)
- Education: LSU

Playing career
- 1966–1969: LSU
- Position: Guard

Coaching career (HC unless noted)

Basketball
- 1972-1974: App State (assistant)
- 1974-1975: App State (interim HC)
- 1975-1994: Coastal Carolina
- 1994-1998: Oklahoma City Cavalry
- 1998-2000: Idaho Stampede
- 2004-2005: Great Lakes Storm
- 2005-2009: BC Khimki (AHC)
- 2010-2011: Al-Rayyan SC
- 2012-2013: BC Krasnye Krylia (assistant)
- 2014-2015: BC Spartak Primorye
- 2015-2016: PBC Lokomotiv Kuban (assistant)
- 2018-2019: BC Kalev (assistant)

Baseball
- 1984: Coastal Carolina

Administrative career (AD unless noted)
- 1983–1986: Coastal Carolina

Head coaching record
- Overall: 308–257 (.545)
- Tournaments: 0–2 (NCAA Division I)

Accomplishments and honors

Championships
- 4 Big South regular season (1988,1989,1990,1991); 3 Big South tournament (1990,1991,1993)

Awards
- Big South Coach of the Year (1988,1989,1990); Illinois Basketball Coaches Association Hall of Fame Inductee (1995)

Russ Bergman (born September 13, 1947) is an American former college basketball player and coach. Bergman played collegiately at LSU, and would go on to be an interim basketball coach at Appalachian State, and head coach of Coastal Carolina.

== Playing career ==
Bergman was a 4-year scholarship player for the LSU Tigers. He played under Press Maravich and was roommates with the legendary Pete Maravich.

== Coaching career ==
Bergman would start his coaching career as an assistant at Appalachian State, working under his coach at LSU (Press Maravich) in 1972. He would later become the interim head coach at App State following Maravich stepping down in the middle of the 1974–75 season.

His tenure at Coastal Carolina would end following a bizarre incident when he called a local reporter at The Sun News in Myrtle Beach and confessed to recruiting violations, this was after Bergman took the team to watch the movie Blue Chips, this and an NCAA investigation led Bergman to resign from his position following the 1994 season.

Following his departure from Coastal Carolina, Bergman would make multiple stops coaching in professional leagues in both the United States and Eastern Europe.

== Head coaching record ==
Record table
Season	Team	Overall	Conference	Standing	Postseason
App State (Southern Conference) (1974–1975)
1974–75	App State	2–12	1-7	8th	
App Sate:		2–12 (.143)	1–7 (.125)		
Coastal Carolina (NAIA) (1975–1985)
1975–76	Coastal Carolina	10-16			
1976–77	Coastal Carolina	21-10			
1977–78	Coastal Carolina	20-9			
1978–79	Coastal Carolina	18-13			
1979–80	Coastal Carolina	10-19			
1980–81	Coastal Carolina	15-11			
1981–82	Coastal Carolina	21-9			
1982–83	Coastal Carolina	21-10			
1983–84	Coastal Carolina	14-16			
1984–85	Coastal Carolina	7-21			
NAIA:		157–133 (.541)			
Coastal Carolina (Big South Conference) (1985–1994)
1985–86	Coastal Carolina	10–17	1-8	8th	
1986–87	Coastal Carolina	12–16	4-4	6th	
1987–88	Coastal Carolina	17–11	9-4	1st	
1988–89	Coastal Carolina	14–14	9-3	1st	
1989–90	Coastal Carolina	23-6	11-1	1st	
1990–91	Coastal Carolina	24-8	13-1	1st	NCAA Division I First Round
1991–92	Coastal Carolina	12-19	6-8	5th	
1992–93	Coastal Carolina	22-10	12-4	2nd	NCAA Division I First Round
1993–94	Coastal Carolina	15-11	10-8	6th	
Big South:		149–112 (.571)	75–42 (.641)		
Coastal Carolina:		306–245 (.555)	75–42 (.641)		
Total:		308–257 (.545)			
National champion Postseason invitational champion Conference regular season champion Conference regular season and conference tournament champion Division regular season champion Division regular season and conference tournament champion Conference tournament champion

== Baseball coach ==
Bergman became the interim coach of the Coastal Carolina Chanticleers during the 1984 season, when he served as both the Athletics Director and coach of the Men's Basketball team. He fired then baseball coach Larry Carr after a dispute in April 1984. Bergman would finish the year serving as the school's baseball coach.

=== Head coaching record ===
Record table
Season	Team	Overall	Conference	Standing	Postseason
Coastal Carolina (NAIA) (1984)
1984	Coastal Carolina	12–3			NAIA World Series
Coastal Carolina:		12–3 (.800)			
Total:		12–3 (.800)			
National champion Postseason invitational champion Conference regular season champion Conference regular season and conference tournament champion Division regular season champion Division regular season and conference tournament champion Conference tournament champion
