= 1990–91 Florida A&M Rattlers basketball team =

American college basketball season

1990–91 Florida A&M Rattlers basketball

MEAC tournament champions
- Conference: Mid-Eastern Athletic Conference
- Record: 17–14 (9–7 MEAC)
- Head coach: Willie Booker (7th season)
- Home arena: Jake Gaither Gymnasium

1990–91 MEAC men's basketball standings
	Conf.				Overall
Team	W		L	PCT	W		L	PCT
Coppin State	14	–	2	.875	19	–	11	.633
Delaware State	10	–	6	.625	19	–	11	.633
North Carolina A&T	10	–	6	.625	17	–	10	.630
South Carolina State	10	–	6	.625	13	–	15	.464
Florida A&M †	9	–	7	.563	17	–	14	.548
Howard	7	–	9	.438	8	–	20	.286
Morgan State	6	–	10	.375	7	–	22	.241
Maryland Eastern Shore	3	–	13	.188	5	–	23	.179
Bethune–Cookman	3	–	13	.188	5	–	24	.172
† 1991 MEAC tournament winner Rankings from AP Poll

The 1990–91 Florida A&M Rattlers men's basketball team represented Florida A&M University during the 1990–91 NCAA Division I men's basketball season. The Rattlers, led by seventh-year head coach Willie Booker, played their home games at the Teaching Gym as members of the Mid-Eastern Athletic Conference. They won the MEAC tournament for their first conference tournament championship in the MEAC and their first overall since winning the SIAC in 1978. Due to being among the six lowest-rated conference in the nation, the Rattlers would have to play in a play-in game to try to win a bid to the NCAA tournament. Playing in the "Southland-MEAC Play-in" on the road versus Northeast Louisiana, the Rattlers lost 87–63, ending their season.

== Roster ==
1991–92 Florida A&M Rattlers men's basketball team
Players
Coaches

Pos.	#	Name	Height	Weight	Year	Hometown
F		Kelvin Daniels	6 ft 7 in (2.01 m)	—	Sr
G		Kenneth Davis	6 ft 0 in (1.83 m)	—	Jr
F		DeLon Turner	6 ft 5 in (1.96 m)	—	So
G		Reginald Finney	6 ft 5 in (1.96 m)	—	Jr
F		Thomas Dow	6 ft 6 in (1.98 m)	—	Sr
G		Darrell Williams	6 ft 5 in (1.96 m)	—	Fr
C		Joey McGear	6 ft 9 in (2.06 m)	—	Fr
G		Copeland Jackson	6 ft 4 in (1.93 m)	—	So
G		Al Lawson	6 ft 2 in (1.88 m)	—	So
G		Clarence Davis	6 ft 3 in (1.91 m)	—	So
G		Djuan Graham	6 ft 2 in (1.88 m)	—	Jr
F		Marlon Flanagan	6 ft 6 in (1.98 m)	—	Fr
G		Joe Godbolt	6 ft 5 in (1.96 m)	—	Fr

Head coach

- Willie Booker

Assistant coach(es)

Legend

- (C) Team captain
- (S) Suspended
- (I) Ineligible
- (W) Walk-on
- Injured
- Current redshirt

Roster

== Schedule and results ==
Date time, TV	Rank^{#}	Opponent^{#}	Result	Record	Site (attendance) city, state
Non-conference regular season
MEAC tournament
February 28, 1991*		vs. North Carolina A&T; Quarterfinals	W 87–77	15–14	
Mar 1, 1991*		vs. Coppin State; Semifinals	W 74–70	16–14	
Mar 2, 1999*		vs. Delaware State; Championship game	W 84–80	17–14	Norfolk Scope; Norfolk, Virginia
*Non-conference game. ^{#}Rankings from AP Poll. (#) Tournament seedings in parentheses. All times are in Eastern Time.
