= Bruce Parkhill =

American basketball coach

Biographical details
- Born: June 6, 1949 (age 77); Philadelphia, Pennsylvania, U.S.

Playing career
- 1968–1971: Lock Haven

Coaching career (HC unless noted)
- 1972–1974: Virginia (graduate assistant)
- 1974–1977: William & Mary (assistant)
- 1977–1983: William & Mary
- 1983–1995: Penn State
- 2000–2002: Ohio State (assistant)

Head coaching record
- Overall: 270–244 (.525)
- Tournaments: 1–1 (NCAA Division I); 9–5 (NIT)

Accomplishments and honors

Championships
- ECAC South regular season (1983); Atlantic 10 tournament (1991)

Awards
- ECAC South Coach of the Year (1983); Atlantic 10 Coach of the Year (1990)

Bruce Parkhill (born June 16, 1949) is a former head college men's basketball coach whose stops included William & Mary (1977–1983) and Penn State (1983–1995).

His 1990–91 Nittany Lions won the Atlantic 10 Conference Tournament and stunned UCLA, 74–69, in the opening round of the NCAA Tournament at the Syracuse Carrier Dome

Parkhill's efforts assembled a team that's generally regarded as one of the best in the history of the program, though he resigned Sept. 6, 1995 just before what proved to be a memorable season. The 1995–96 Nittany Lions, led by Jerry Dunn and assistants Ed DeChellis and Frank Haith, started 13–0 (ranked as high as No. 9 in AP poll), moved from Rec Hall to the Bryce Jordan Center, finished tied for second in the Big Ten, the school's highest placing ever, but were upset as a 5-seed in the NCAA first round by Arkansas.

Parkhill guided Penn State to four straight 20-win seasons before starting play in the Big Ten in 1992–93. All 43 seniors who played for him at Penn State did graduate.

His father, Will, lettered for the Nittany Lion basketball team in 1948. A 1967 State College Area High School graduate, Parkhill lettered in three sports at Lock Haven University before graduating in 1971. Aside from his participation in basketball, Parkhill was a goalie on the Lock Haven soccer team and was a conference champion for the track and field team in the javelin throw. His younger brother, Barry Parkhill, was a basketball standout at the University of Virginia.

Later in his career, Parkhill served as an assistant coach at Ohio State University and earlier as a head coach for the William & Mary Tribe.

His tenure at William & Mary was fairly successful. Bruce guided the Indians (W&M's official mascot at the time) to an 89–75 (54.3%) overall record between 1977 and 1983. On December 7, 1977, William & Mary upset second-ranked North Carolina 78–75, in Williamsburg. The 1982–83 season saw W&M go 9–0 in conference play to win the ECAC South regular season championship. .

== Head coaching record ==
Record table
Season	Team	Overall	Conference	Standing	Postseason
William & Mary Tribe (NCAA Division I Independent) (1977–1979)
1977–78	William & Mary	16–10			
1978–79	William & Mary	9–17			
William & Mary Tribe (ECAC South) (1979–1983)
1979–80	William & Mary	12–15			
1980–81	William & Mary	16–12			
1981–82	William & Mary	16–12	6–5	4th	
1982–83	William & Mary	20–9	9–0	1st	NIT First Round
William & Mary:		89–75 (.543)	15–5 (.750)		
Penn State Nittany Lions (Atlantic 10 Conference) (1983–1991)
1983–84	Penn State	5–22	3–15	10th	
1984–85	Penn State	8–19	4–14	9th	
1985–86	Penn State	12–17	5–13	T–8th	
1986–87	Penn State	15–12	9–9	T–4th	
1987–88	Penn State	13–14	9–9	T–4th	
1988–89	Penn State	20–12	12–6	4th	NIT Second Round
1989–90	Penn State	25–9	13–5	2nd	NIT Third Place
1990–91	Penn State	21–11	10–8	T–3rd	NCAA Division I Second Round
Penn State Nittany Lions (NCAA Division I Independent) (1991–1992)
1991–92	Penn State	21–8			NIT First Round
Penn State Nittany Lions (Big Ten Conference) (1992–1995)
1992–93	Penn State	7–20	2–16	11th	
1993–94	Penn State	13–14	6–12	T–8th	
1994–95	Penn State	21–11	9–9	T–7th	NIT Third Place
Penn State:		181–169 (.517)	82–116 (.414)		
Total:		270–244 (.525)			
National champion Postseason invitational champion Conference regular season champion Conference regular season and conference tournament champion Division regular season champion Division regular season and conference tournament champion Conference tournament champion
