= Marcus Kennedy =

American basketball player (born 1967)

Personal information
- Born: January 29, 1967 (age 59) Highland Park, Michigan, U.S.
- Listed height: 6 ft 7 in (2.01 m)
- Listed weight: 245 lb (111 kg)

Career information
- High school: Troy (Troy, Michigan)
- College: Ferris State (1986–1989); Eastern Michigan (1990–1991)
- NBA draft: 1991: 2nd round, 54th overall pick
- Drafted by: Portland Trail Blazers
- Playing career: 1991–1998
- Position: Power forward

Career history
- 1991–1992: Phonola Caserta
- 1991–1992: Grand Rapids Hoops
- 1992: Winnipeg Thunder
- 1992–1993: Juvier Murcia
- 1993–1995: Grand Rapids Hoops/Mackers
- 1995–1996: Deportivo General Roca
- 1997–1998: Mitsui Falcons

Career highlights
- All-CBA First Team (1992); CBA Rookie of the Year (1992); CBA All-Rookie Team (1992); MAC Player of the Year (1991); First-team All-MAC (1991)
- Stats at Basketball Reference

Marcus James Kennedy (born January 29, 1967) is an American former professional basketball player. He was a second round NBA draft pick and played professionally in several countries.

== College career ==
Kennedy, a 6'7" power forward, played college basketball at NCAA Division II Ferris State University from 1986 to 1989, then transferred to NCAA Division I Eastern Michigan for his senior season. Kennedy averaged 20.0 points and 8.1 rebounds and was named Mid-American Conference Player of the Year and led the Eagles to the program's first NCAA tournament Sweet 16.

== Professional career ==
After his college career, Kennedy was drafted in the second round of the 1991 NBA draft by the Portland Trail Blazers (54th pick overall), but did not make the team. Instead, Kennedy played for the Grand Rapids Hoops of the Continental Basketball Association (CBA), where he averaged 22.6 points and 10.5 rebounds per game and was named first team all-league and CBA Rookie of the Year. He would play parts of four seasons for the Hoops (later called the Grand Rapids Mackers), averaging 16.5 points and 8.0 rebounds for his CBA career. Kennedy also played for the Winnipeg Thunder of the World Basketball Association as well as professionally in Spain, Italy, Argentina and Japan.
