= John Egli =

Biographical details
- Born: 1921; Williamsport, Pennsylvania, U.S.
- Died: July 1, 1982 (aged 60–61); State College, Pennsylvania, U.S.

Playing career
- 1941-1943: Penn State

Coaching career (HC unless noted)
- 1954-1968: Penn State

Head coaching record
- Overall: 187–135 (.581)
- Tournaments: NCAA: 1-3 (.250); NIT: 0-1 (.000)

John Egli (1921-1982) was a college men's basketball coach. He was the head coach of Penn State from 1954 to 1968. He coached Penn State to a 187-135 record, making two NCAA tournament appearances. Egli played college basketball at Penn State.

== Head coaching record ==
Record table
Season	Team	Overall	Conference	Standing	Postseason
Penn State Nittany Lions (Independent) (1954–1968)
1954–55	Penn State	18-10			NCAA Sweet Sixteen
1955–56	Penn State	12-14			
1956–57	Penn State	15-10			
1957–58	Penn State	8-11			
1958–59	Penn State	11-9			
1959–60	Penn State	11-11			
1960–61	Penn State	11-13			
1961–62	Penn State	12-11			
1962–63	Penn State	15-5			
1963–64	Penn State	16-7			
1964–65	Penn State	20-4			NCAA First Round
1965–66	Penn State	18-6			NIT First Round
1966–67	Penn State	10-14			
1967–68	Penn State	10-10			
Penn State:		187–135 (.581)			
Total:		187–135 (.581)			
National champion Postseason invitational champion Conference regular season champion Conference regular season and conference tournament champion Division regular season champion Division regular season and conference tournament champion Conference tournament champion
