= Jerry Dunn (basketball) =

American college basketball coach

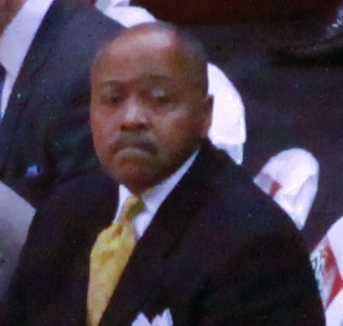
- Dunn in 2009

Biographical details
- Born: May 6, 1953 (age 73); Raleigh, North Carolina, U.S.
- Education: Casper College; George Mason University

Playing career
- 1973–1974: Casper JC

Coaching career (HC unless noted)
- 1977–1983: George Mason (assistant)
- 1983–1995: Penn State (assistant)
- 1995–2003: Penn State
- 2003–2007: West Virginia (assistant)
- 2007–2010: Michigan (assistant)
- 2012–2013: New York Knicks (assistant)
- 2014–2019: Tuskegee

Head coaching record
- Overall: 174–203 (.462)
- Tournaments: 2–2 (NCAA Division I); 4–1 (NIT)

Jerry Michael Dunn (born May 6, 1953) is an American college basketball coach who was most recently the head coach at Tuskegee. Dunn is a former men's basketball assistant coach at the University of Michigan, who held the title of Associate Head Coach. He previously held the same position at West Virginia University, but followed head coach John Beilein to Michigan after the 2006–2007 season. Dunn served as the head coach of Penn State Nittany Lions basketball from 1995 to 2003. His twin brother Terry Dunn was the head coach at Dartmouth Big Green men's basketball from 2004–05 to 2009–10.

== Early life and education ==
Born in Raleigh, North Carolina, Dunn moved to Washington, D.C., with his family at age 13, then to Fort Dix, New Jersey three years later when his stepfather, a United States Army officer, was assigned there. Dunn graduated from Pemberton Township High School in 1971.

He then moved to Casper, Wyoming to attend Casper Junior College and played one season of basketball in the 1973–74 season before tendonitis ended his playing career. After completing his associate degree, Dunn returned to Washington, D. C. to work for the federal government. Dunn then enrolled at nearby George Mason University in 1978 and graduated in 1981 with a bachelor's degree in health and physical education with a minor in history.

== Coaching career ==
Dunn is a graduate of George Mason University, where he was a player and assistant coach from 1977 to 1983.

After 13 seasons as an assistant under Penn State head coach Bruce Parkhill, Dunn served as the head coach at Penn State from 1995 to 2003. Coach Dunn led his team to its first Top Ten ranking and the 1996 NCAA Tournament. In 2001, he led Penn State to the Big Ten Tournament semi-finals and to a number 7 seed in the NCAA Tournament; Penn State beat number 2 seed, North Carolina, to advance to the Sweet Sixteen for the first time in over half a century. Coach Dunn reached 50 wins and 100 wins faster than any other head men's basketball coach in Penn State history.

Dunn served as an assistant coach on John Beilein's staff at West Virginia from 2003 to 2007. He followed Beilein to the University of Michigan when Beilein was hired as the Michigan head basketball coach. On December 29, 2009, Dunn took an indefinite leave of absence from Michigan due to personal matters.

Prior to becoming head coach at Tuskegee, Jerry Dunn was Assistant Coach Player Development for the New York Knicks.

On May 15, 2019, Tuskegee announced that it would not be renewing Dunn's contract.

== Head coaching record ==
Record table
Season	Team	Overall	Conference	Standing	Postseason
Penn State Nittany Lions (Big Ten Conference) (1995–2003)
1995–96	Penn State	21–7	12–6	T–2nd	NCAA Division I First Round
1996–97	Penn State	10–17	3–15	10th	
1997–98	Penn State	19–13	8–8	7th	NIT Runner-up
1998–99	Penn State	13–14	5–11	T–8th	
1999–00	Penn State	19–16	5–11	9th	
2000–01	Penn State	21–12	7–9	T–5th	NCAA Division I Sweet 16
2001–02	Penn State	7–21	3–13	10th	
2002–03	Penn State	7–21	2–14	11th	
Penn State:		117–121 (.492)	45–87 (.341)		
Tuskegee Golden Tigers (Southern Intercollegiate Athletic Conference) (2014–2019)
2014–15	Tuskegee	15–13	11–8	3rd (Western)	
2015–16	Tuskegee	14–13	9–9	T–5th (Western)	
2016–17	Tuskegee	8–19	6–10	7th (Western)	
2017–18	Tuskegee	7–22	5–14	T–6th (Western)	
2018–19	Tuskegee	13–15	8–10	5th (Western)	
Tuskegee:		57–82 (.410)	39–51 (.433)		
Total:		174–203 (.462)			
