= Michael Hopkins (basketball) =

American basketball player and coach

Biographical details
- Born: March 6, 1960 (age 66)

Playing career

Basketball
- 1989–1993: Coastal Carolina

Coaching career (HC unless noted)

Basketball
- 1984–1985: Coastal Carolina (assistant)
- 1985–1986: USC Aiken (assistant)
- 1986–1988: Aiken HS
- 1988–1989: Coastal Carolina (assistant)
- 1989–1991: Western Carolina (assistant)
- 1991–1994: East Carolina (assistant)
- 1994–1998: Coastal Carolina
- 1998–1999: Carolina Forest HS
- 1999–2002: The Citadel (assistant)
- 2002–2003: Virginia Tech (assistant)

Head coaching record
- Overall: 30–76

Michael Wayne Hopkins (born March 6, 1960) is an American former college basketball player and coach.

Hopkins played collegiately for the Coastal Carolina Chanticleers between 1989 and 1993. He was an assistant coach for three college programs from 1998 to 1994. He was head coach of the Chanticleers from 1994 to 1998 and compiled a 30–76 overall record. He subsequently was an assistant coach with The Citadel from 1999 to 2002, then took the same role at Virginia Tech for the 2002–03 season.

== Head coaching record ==
Record table
Season	Team	Overall	Conference	Standing	Postseason
Coastal Carolina Chanticleers (Big South Conference) (1994–1998)
1994–95	Coastal Carolina	6–20	3–13	9th	
1995–96	Coastal Carolina	5–21	1–13	8th	
1996–97	Coastal Carolina	11–16	6–8	5th	
1997–98	Coastal Carolina	8–19	4–8	5th	
Coastal Carolina:		30–76 (.283)	14–42 (.250)		
Total:		30–76 (.283)			
