= 1991 NCAA Division I men's basketball tournament =

Edition of USA college basketball tournament

- Season: 1990–91
- Teams: 64
- Finals site: Hoosier Dome, Indianapolis, Indiana
- Champions: Duke Blue Devils (1st title, 5th title game, 9th Final Four)
- Runner-up: Kansas Jayhawks (6th title game, 9th Final Four)
- Semifinalists: North Carolina Tar Heels (10th Final Four); UNLV Runnin' Rebels (4th Final Four)
- Winning coach: Mike Krzyzewski (1st title)
- MOP: Christian Laettner (Duke)
- Attendance: 665,707
- Top scorer: Christian Laettner (Duke) (125 points)

The 1991 NCAA Division I men's basketball tournament involved 64 schools playing in single-elimination play to determine the national champion of men's NCAA Division I college basketball. The 53rd annual edition of the tournament began on March 14, 1991, and ended with the championship game on April 1, at the Hoosier Dome in Indianapolis, Indiana. A total of 63 games were played.

Duke, coached by Mike Krzyzewski, won a rematch of the previous year's national final matchup against undefeated UNLV 79–77 in the semifinal, then won the national title with a 72–65 victory in the final game over Kansas, coached by Roy Williams. This was the first national championship game for Williams as a head coach. Kansas defeated Williams' mentor Dean Smith and North Carolina (where Williams later coached) in the semifinal. Kansas made its second trip to the national championship game in four seasons, the prior appearance being 1988 when they defeated Oklahoma. Christian Laettner of Duke was named the tournament's Most Outstanding Player.

This tournament marked the first time a #15 seed upset a #2 seed since the tournament field expanded to 64 teams in 1985, when Richmond accomplished against Syracuse in the East region. In addition, for the first time ever, at least one team seeded #9 through #15 won a first-round game. This feat would be followed in 2013, 2016, and 2021.

This tournament adopted the NBA's 10ths-second timer during the final minute of each period in all arenas.

== Schedule and venues ==
1991 first and second rounds
1991 Regionals (blue) and Final Four (red)

The following are the sites that were selected to host each round of the 1991 tournament:

First and Second Rounds

- March 14 and 16
  - East Region
    - Cole Field House, College Park, Maryland (Host: University of Maryland, College Park)
  - Midwest Region
    - Hubert H. Humphrey Metrodome, Minneapolis, Minnesota (Host: University of Minnesota)
  - Southeast Region
    - Freedom Hall, Louisville, Kentucky (Host: University of Louisville)
  - West Region
    - Jon M. Huntsman Center, Salt Lake City, Utah (Host: University of Utah)
- March 15 and 17
  - East Region
    - Carrier Dome, Syracuse, New York (Host: Syracuse University)
  - Midwest Region
    - University of Dayton Arena, Dayton, Ohio (Host: University of Dayton)
  - Southeast Region
    - Omni Coliseum, Atlanta, Georgia (Host: Georgia Institute of Technology)
  - West Region
    - McKale Center, Tucson, Arizona (Host: University of Arizona)

Regional semifinals and finals (Sweet Sixteen and Elite Eight)

- March 21 and 23
  - Southeast Regional, Charlotte Coliseum, Charlotte, North Carolina (Host: University of North Carolina at Charlotte)
  - West Regional, Kingdome, Seattle, Washington (Host: University of Washington)
- March 22 and 24
  - East Regional, Brendan Byrne Arena, East Rutherford, New Jersey (Hosts: Seton Hall University, Big East Conference)
  - Midwest Regional, Pontiac Silverdome, Pontiac, Michigan (Host: University of Detroit Mercy)

National semifinals and championship (Final Four and championship)

- March 30 and April 1
  - Hoosier Dome, Indianapolis, Indiana (Hosts: Butler University, Midwestern Collegiate Conference)

== Teams ==
There were 26 automatic bids awarded to the tournament - of these, 23 were given to the winners of their conference's tournament, while three were awarded to the team with the best regular-season record in their conference (Big Ten, Ivy League and Pac-10). Another 35 bids were awarded by the NCAA tournament committee at-large to the best teams in the nation not already qualified.

The Big Eight was eligible for an automatic bid to the tournament, but their conference tournament was won by Missouri, who were on probation and ineligible for the NCAA tournament. No automatic bid was awarded to the Big Eight.

=== Play-in Games ===
The remaining three bids were decided by play-in games between the six lowest-rated conferences in the nation. These matchups, which were decided prior to the season, paired the tournament champions of the six lowest-rated conferences in the nation in games played at campus sites:

- The winner of the NEC tournament, Saint Francis (PA), hosted the winner of the Patriot League tournament, Fordham.
- The winner of the Southland tournament, Northeast Louisiana, hosted the winner of the MEAC tournament, Florida A&M.
- The winner of the SWAC tournament, Jackson State, hosted the winner of the Big South tournament, Coastal Carolina.

Unlike the later Opening Round and First Four games, the play-in games were not considered part of the NCAA tournament. This meant that the winners of these games were not credited with an NCAA tournament win, and only the teams that advanced to the field of 64 were credited with an NCAA tournament appearance.

All three games were played on March 6, 1991.

NEC-Patriot Play-in; Loretto, Pennsylvania
Fordham	64
Saint Francis	70

Southland-MEAC Play-in; Monroe, Louisiana
Florida A&M	63
Northeast Louisiana	87

SWAC-Big South Play-in; Jackson, Mississippi
Coastal Carolina	78
Jackson State	59

=== Automatic qualifiers ===
Five conference champions made their first NCAA tournament appearances: Coastal Carolina (Big South), Georgia State (TAAC), Green Bay (Mid-Continent), Saint Francis (PA) (NEC), and Saint Peter's (MAAC).

Automatic qualifiers
Conference	Team	Appearance	Last bid
ACC	North Carolina	25th	1990
American South	Louisiana Tech	5th	1989
Atlantic 10	Penn State	6th	1965
Big East	Seton Hall	3rd	1989
Big Sky	Montana	2nd	1975
Big Ten	Ohio State	17th	1990
Big West	UNLV	12th	1990
CAA	Richmond	5th	1990
East Coast	Towson State	2nd	1990
Ivy League	Princeton	17th	1990
MAAC	Saint Peter's	1st	Never
MAC	Eastern Michigan	2nd	1988
MCC	Xavier	8th	1990
Metro	Florida State	7th	1989
Mid-Continent	Green Bay	1st	Never
Missouri Valley	Creighton	9th	1989
NAC	Northeastern	7th	1987
Ohio Valley	Murray State	5th	1990
Pac-10	Arizona	10th	1990
SEC	Alabama	10th	1990
Southern	East Tennessee State	4th	1990
Sun Belt	South Alabama	4th	1989
SWC	Arkansas	17th	1990
TAAC	Georgia State	1st	Never
WAC	BYU	15th	1990
West Coast	Pepperdine	9th	1986
Big South–SWAC Play-in	Coastal Carolina	1st	Never
MEAC–Southland Play-in	Northeast Louisiana	4th	1990
Patriot–NEC Play-in	Saint Francis (PA)	1st	Never

=== Tournament seeds ===
East Regional – Brendan Byrne Arena, East Rutherford, New Jersey
Seed	School	Conference	Record	Berth type
1	North Carolina	ACC	25–5	Automatic
2	Syracuse	Big East	26–5	At-Large
3	Oklahoma State	Big Eight	22–7	At-Large
4	UCLA	Pac-10	23–8	At-Large
5	Mississippi State	SEC	20–8	At-Large
6	NC State	ACC	19–10	At-Large
7	Purdue	Big Ten	17–11	At-Large
8	Princeton	Ivy League	24–2	Automatic
9	Villanova	Big East	16–14	At-Large
10	Temple	Atlantic 10	21–9	At-Large
11	Southern Miss	Metro	21–7	At-Large
12	Eastern Michigan	MAC	24–6	Automatic
13	Penn State	Atlantic 10	20–10	Automatic
14	New Mexico	WAC	20–9	At-Large
15	Richmond	CAA	21–9	Automatic
16	Northeastern	NAC	22–10	Automatic

Southeast Regional – Charlotte Coliseum, Charlotte, North Carolina
Seed	School	Conference	Record	Berth type
1	Arkansas	SWC	31–3	Automatic
2	Indiana	Big Ten	27–4	At-Large
3	Kansas	Big Eight	22–7	At-Large
4	Alabama	SEC	21–9	Automatic
5	Wake Forest	ACC	18–10	At-Large
6	Pittsburgh	Big East	20–11	At-Large
7	Florida State	Metro	20–10	Automatic
8	Arizona State	Pac-10	19–9	At-Large
9	Rutgers	Atlantic 10	19–9	At-Large
10	USC	Pac-10	19–9	At-Large
11	Georgia	SEC	17–12	At-Large
12	Louisiana Tech	American South	21–9	Automatic
13	Murray State	Ohio Valley	24–8	Automatic
14	New Orleans	American South	23–7	At-Large
15	Coastal Carolina	Big South	24–7	Play-in Winner
16	Georgia State	TAAC	16–14	Automatic

Midwest Regional – Pontiac Silverdome, Pontiac, Michigan
Seed	School	Conference	Record	Berth type
1	Ohio State	Big Ten	25–3	Automatic
2	Duke	ACC	26–7	At-Large
3	Nebraska	Big Eight	26–7	At-Large
4	St. John's	Big East	20–8	At-Large
5	Texas	SWC	22–8	At-Large
6	LSU	SEC	20–9	At-Large
7	Iowa	Big Ten	20–10	At-Large
8	Georgia Tech	ACC	16–12	At-Large
9	DePaul	Independent	20–8	At-Large
10	East Tennessee State	Southern	28–4	Automatic
11	Connecticut	Big East	18–10	At-Large
12	Saint Peter's	MAAC	24–6	Automatic
13	Northern Illinois	Mid-Continent	25–5	At-Large
14	Xavier	MCC	21–9	Automatic
15	Northeast Louisiana	Southland	25–7	Play-in Winner
16	Towson State	East Coast	19–10	Automatic

West Regional – Kingdome, Seattle, Washington
Seed	School	Conference	Record	Berth type
1	UNLV	Big West	30–0	Automatic
2	Arizona	Pac-10	26–6	Automatic
3	Seton Hall	Big East	22–8	Automatic
4	Utah	WAC	28–3	At-Large
5	Michigan State	Big Ten	18–10	At-Large
6	New Mexico State	Big West	23–5	At-Large
7	Virginia	ACC	21–11	At-Large
8	Georgetown	Big East	18–12	At-Large
9	Vanderbilt	SEC	17–12	At-Large
10	BYU	WAC	20–12	Automatic
11	Creighton	Missouri Valley	23–7	Automatic
12	Green Bay	Mid-Continent	24–6	Automatic
13	South Alabama	Sun Belt	22–8	Automatic
14	Pepperdine	West Coast	22–8	Automatic
15	Saint Francis (PA)	NEC	24–7	Play-in Winner
16	Montana	Big Sky	23–7	Automatic

== Bracket ==
=== East Regional – East Rutherford, New Jersey ===
First round
1	North Carolina	101
16	Northeastern	66
Syracuse
8	Princeton	48
9	Villanova	50
5	Mississippi State	56
12	Eastern Michigan	76
Syracuse
4	UCLA	69
13	Penn State	74
6	NC State	114
11	Southern Miss	85
College Park
3	Oklahoma State	67
14	New Mexico	54
7	Purdue	63
10	Temple	80
College Park
2	Syracuse	69
15	Richmond	73

Quarter-finals
1	North Carolina	84
9	Villanova	69
12	Eastern Michigan	71^{OT}
13	Penn State	68
6	NC State	64
3	Oklahoma State	73
10	Temple	77
15	Richmond	64

Regional semifinals
1	North Carolina	93
12	Eastern Michigan	67
3	Oklahoma State	63
10	Temple	72^{OT}

Regional Finals
1	North Carolina	75
10	Temple	72

=== Southeast Regional – Charlotte, North Carolina ===
First round
1	Arkansas	117
16	Georgia State	76
Atlanta
8	Arizona State	79
9	Rutgers	76
5	Wake Forest	71
12	Louisiana Tech	65
Atlanta
4	Alabama	89
13	Murray State	79
6	Pittsburgh	76^{OT}
11	Georgia	68
Louisville
3	Kansas	55
14	New Orleans	49
7	Florida State	75
10	USC	72
Louisville
2	Indiana	79
15	Coastal Carolina	69

Quarter-finals
1	Arkansas	97
8	Arizona State	90
5	Wake Forest	88
4	Alabama	96
6	Pittsburgh	66
3	Kansas	77
7	Florida State	60
2	Indiana	82

Regional semifinals
1	Arkansas	93
4	Alabama	70
3	Kansas	83
2	Indiana	65

Regional Finals
1	Arkansas	81
3	Kansas	93

=== Midwest Regional – Pontiac, Michigan ===
First round
1	Ohio State	97
16	Towson State	86
Dayton
8	Georgia Tech	87
9	DePaul	70
5	Texas	73
12	Saint Peter's	65
Dayton
4	St. John's	75
13	Northern Illinois	68
6	LSU	62
11	Connecticut	79
Minneapolis
3	Nebraska	84
14	Xavier	89
7	Iowa	76
10	East Tennessee State	73
Minneapolis
2	Duke	102
15	Northeast Louisiana	73

Quarter-finals
1	Ohio State	65
8	Georgia Tech	61
5	Texas	76
4	St. John's	84
11	Connecticut	66
14	Xavier	50
7	Iowa	70
2	Duke	85

Regional semifinals
1	Ohio State	74
4	St. John's	91
11	Connecticut	67
2	Duke	81

Regional Finals
4	St. John's	61
2	Duke	78

=== West Regional – Seattle, Washington ===
First round
1	UNLV	99
16	Montana	65
Tucson
8	Georgetown	70
9	Vanderbilt	60
5	Michigan State	60
12	Wisconsin–Green Bay	58
Tucson
4	Utah	82
13	South Alabama	72
6	New Mexico State	56
11	Creighton	64
Salt Lake City
3	Seton Hall	71
14	Pepperdine	51
7	Virginia	48
10	BYU	61
Salt Lake City
2	Arizona	93
15	Saint Francis	80

Quarter-finals
1	UNLV	62
8	Georgetown	54
5	Michigan State	84
4	Utah	85^{2OT}
11	Creighton	69
3	Seton Hall	81
10	BYU	61
2	Arizona	76

Regional semifinals
1	UNLV	83
4	Utah	66
3	Seton Hall	81
2	Arizona	77

Regional Finals
1	UNLV	77
3	Seton Hall	65

=== Final Four – Indianapolis, Indiana ===
National semifinals
E1	North Carolina	73
SE3	Kansas	79
MW2	Duke	79
W1	UNLV	77

National championship game
SE3	Kansas	65
MW2	Duke	72

== Broadcast information ==
For the first time, CBS Sports showed all 63 tournament games. In the first three rounds, games were shown on a regional basis, except for one game each on Saturday and Sunday in the second round. Usual start times were noon and 7:30 or 8 p.m. Eastern time on each of the Thursdays and Fridays. During the weekend of the second round, the national telecast began at noon, with the regional windows (three on Saturday, two on Sunday) following. Although the times would be adjusted, the same basic format was in place until 2010. As of 2011, the regional broadcasts have been replaced by simulcast feeds on non-broadcast networks owned by Turner Sports.

=== Announcers ===
- Jim Nantz and Billy Packer – Midwest Regional at Pontiac, Michigan; Final Four at Indianapolis, Indiana
- Dick Stockton and Billy Cunningham – First and Second Rounds at Minneapolis, Minnesota; West Regional at Seattle, Washington
- James Brown and Bill Raftery – First and Second Rounds at Dayton, Ohio; East Regional at East Rutherford, New Jersey
- Greg Gumbel and Quinn Buckner – First and Second Rounds at Tucson, Arizona; Southeast Regional at Charlotte, North Carolina
- Verne Lundquist and Len Elmore – First and Second Rounds at College Park, Maryland
- Brad Nessler and Mimi Griffin – First and Second Rounds at Atlanta, Georgia
- Tim Ryan/Jim Henderson and Dan Bonner – First and Second Rounds at Syracuse, New York
- Sean McDonough and Bill Walton – First and Second Rounds at Louisville, Kentucky
- Mel Proctor and Jack Givens – First and Second Rounds at Salt Lake City, Utah

== Miscellaneous ==
- Duke's 79–77 win over UNLV in the Final Four became one of the biggest upsets in tournament history. Duke was an 8-point underdog in the game. UNLV's juggernaut 1990–91 squad ranked #2 on ESPN Classic's Who's #1? for Best Teams Not To Win a Title. UNLV was undefeated entering the 1991 tournament, which was unmatched until Wichita State in 2014 and Kentucky in 2015. (Saint Joseph's went unbeaten in the 2004 regular season, finishing 27–0, but lost in their conference tournament before the NCAAs. Alcorn State went unbeaten in the 1979 regular season, but got invited to the NIT since the Southwestern Athletic Conference did not have an automatic bid to the NCAAs, and lost to eventual winner Indiana in the 2nd round. Indiana is the last team to win the championship undefeated in 1976).
- This was Duke's fourth (of five) consecutive Final Four trips, the first team to achieve such a feat since UCLA. Since freshmen were not eligible at the time of UCLA's run, Duke's Greg Koubek became the first player to play in four Final Fours, a record matched by Duke teammates Christian Laettner and Brian Davis the next year when the team repeated as national champions.
- For the first time in tournament history a 15-seed defeated a 2-seed. Richmond defeated Syracuse 73–69. Since then this has happened ten additional times: in 1993, Santa Clara defeated Arizona 64–61; in 1997, Coppin State defeated South Carolina 78–65; in 2001, Hampton defeated Iowa State 58–57; on the same day in 2012 Norfolk State defeated Missouri 86–84 and Lehigh defeated Duke 75–70; in 2013 Florida Gulf Coast defeated Georgetown 78–68; in 2016, Middle Tennessee defeated Michigan State 90–81; in 2021, Oral Roberts defeated Ohio State 75–72; in 2022, Saint Peter's defeated Kentucky 85–79; and in 2023, Princeton defeated Arizona 59–55.
- In the Final Four against Kansas, legendary North Carolina coach Dean Smith was ejected from the game for leaving the coach's box.
- For bracketologists, this tournament is notable for several reasons. The first is the upset-heavy opening round, which led to every seed number except 16 being represented by at least one team in the second round. The East region, in particular, featured first round victories by seeds 9, 10, 12, 13, and 15. Two 11's and a 14-seed advanced in the other regions. The second round is equally remarkable because there were no upsets in this round whatsoever. The combination of these two anomalies led to an unprecedented occurrence in which a 10 (Temple), an 11 (Connecticut), and a 12-seed (Eastern Michigan) advanced to the Sweet Sixteen without any of the teams pulling off consecutive upsets. The reason for this was that the first round successes of 15-seed Richmond, 14-seed Xavier, and 13-seed Penn State led to Temple, Connecticut, and Eastern Michigan (respectively) being considered favorites for their second round matchups.
- This was the first NCAA Tournament to feature all four of the North Carolina–based Atlantic Coast Conference teams, also known as the Tobacco Road or Big Four teams: North Carolina, NC State, Duke and Wake Forest.
- The Final Four was also the first to include both halves of the North Carolina–Duke rivalry. Had both teams won, they would have faced each other for the national championship, but to this day, the teams have only faced each other once each in the NCAA tournament and the NIT – the 1971 NIT semifinals at Madison Square Garden, which North Carolina won 73–67 and the 2022 Final Four at the Caesars Superdome, which the 8th-seeded Tar Heels won 81–77 in the last game of Mike Krzyzewski's coaching career.
- This tournament featured three play-in games before the tournament field was announced, featuring the champions of the six conferences with the lowest computer ratings the previous season. The results were: Saint Francis, Pennsylvania (NEC) defeated Fordham (Patriot) 70–64, Coastal Carolina (Big South) over Jackson State (SWAC) 78–59, and NE Louisiana (Southland) over Florida A&M (MEAC) 87–63. These are not opening round games and the losers are not credited with an NCAA tournament appearance.
- UNLV's semi-final loss in the NCAA tournament brought an end to their astounding 45-game win streak. That is the fourth-longest consecutive-game win streak in NCAA Division 1 basketball history, and the longest win streak since the longest one ever (by UCLA) ended in 1974.
- DePaul's appearance is, as of 2023, the last appearance of an independent team in the tournament. The Blue Demons would join the Great Midwest Conference in 1991; Notre Dame, the last prominent independent, would join the Big East in 1995. Though there have been independent teams since, most have been minor programs, or programs in transition between conference affiliations and divisions. It was also the last tournament to feature an East Coast Conference team; the conference, which was born in 1974 from former Middle Atlantic Conference teams, would cease operations in 1994 after most of the teams joined larger conferences.
- Until 2025 this was the only time that Saint Francis (PA) appeared at the tournament.

== See also ==
- 1991 NCAA Division II men's basketball tournament
- 1991 NCAA Division III men's basketball tournament
- 1991 NCAA Division I women's basketball tournament
- 1991 NCAA Division II women's basketball tournament
- 1991 NCAA Division III women's basketball tournament
- 1991 National Invitation Tournament
- 1991 National Women's Invitation Tournament
- 1991 NAIA Division I men's basketball tournament
- 1991 NAIA Division I women's basketball tournament
