= Little Rock Trojans men's basketball statistical leaders =

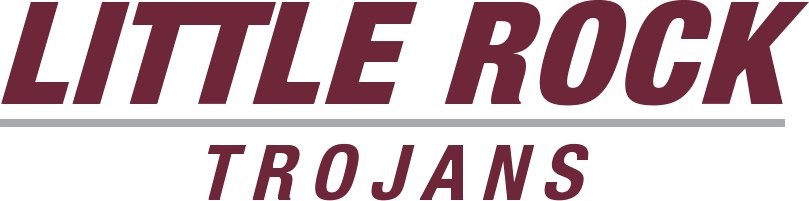

The Little Rock Trojans men's basketball statistical leaders are individual statistical leaders of the Little Rock Trojans men's basketball program in various categories, including points, rebounds, assists, steals, and blocks. Within those areas, the lists identify single-game, single-season, and career leaders. The Trojans represent the University of Arkansas at Little Rock in the NCAA Division I United Athletic Conference.

Little Rock began competing in intercollegiate basketball in 1930. However, the school's record book does not generally list records from before the 1950s, as records from before this period are often incomplete and inconsistent. Since scoring was much lower in this era, and teams played much fewer games during a typical season, it is likely that few or no players from this era would appear on these lists anyway.

The NCAA did not officially record assists as a stat until the 1983–84 season, and blocks and steals until the 1985–86 season, but Little Rock's record books includes players in these stats before these seasons. These lists are updated through the end of the 2021–22 season.

== Scoring ==
Career
Rank	Player	Points	Seasons
1	James Scott	1,731	1987–88 1988–89 1989–90 1990–91
2	Malik Dixon	1,603	1993–94 1994–95 1995–96 1996–97
3	Josh Hagins	1,475	2012–13 2013–14 2014–15 2015–16
4	Derek Fisher	1,393	1992–93 1993–94 1994–95 1995–96
5	Myron Jackson	1,371	1982–83 1983–84 1984–85 1985–86
6	Larry Johnson	1,346	1974–75 1975–76 1976–77 1977–78
7	Mike Rivers	1,304	1980–81 1981–82 1982–83 1983–84
8	Muntrelle Dobbins	1,285	1993–94 1994–95 1995–96 1996–97
9	Derrick Hall	1,271	1989–90 1990–91 1992–93 1993–94
10	Vaughn Williams	1,237	1979–80 1980–81 1981–82 1982–83

Season
Rank	Player	Points	Season
1	Myron Jackson	661	1985–86
2	Tom Brown	656	1975–76
3	Pete Myers	653	1985–86
4	Rayjon Tucker	610	2018–19
5	Malik Dixon	604	1996–97
6	Solomon Bozeman	597	2010–11
7	Curtis Kidd	576	1986–87
8	Tony Martin	546	1991–92
9	Michael Clarke	544	1984–85
10	Johnnie Bell	543	1988–89

Single game
Rank	Player	Points	Season	Opponent
1	Tom Brown	47	1975–76	Southern
2	Carl Brown	46	1988–89	Centenary
3	Ken Dancy	44	1976–77	Dillard
4	Mike Rivers	41	1982–83	Centenary
5	Carl Brown	39	1989–90	UTSA
	Charlie Johnson	39	1971–72	College of the Ozarks
7	Brandon Freeman	38	2004–05	FIU
	Rod Wade	38	1989–90	Hardin-Simmons
	Tom Brown	38	1975–76	UAPB
	John Walker	38	1971–72	Hendrix

== Rebounds ==
Career
Rank	Player	Rebounds	Seasons
1	Larry Johnson	1,315	1974–75 1975–76 1976–77 1977–78
2	Muntrelle Dobbins	1,010	1993–94 1994–95 1995–96 1996–97
3	Charlie Johnson	1,007	1970–71 1971–72 1972–73 1973–74
4	Rashad Jones-Jennings	721	2005–06 2006–07
5	Fred Lord	716	1972–73 1973–74 1974–75
6	Donald Newman	715	1979–80 1980–81 1982–83 1983–84
7	Woodie Watson	626	1974–75 1975–76
8	Michael Clarke	613	1984–85 1985–86
9	Jeff Cummings	589	1986–87 1987–88 1988–89 1989–90
10	Ruot Monyyong	588	2019–20 2020–21

Season
Rank	Player	Rebounds	Season
1	Larry Johnson	402	1975–76
2	Charlie Johnson	393	1972–73
3	Rashad Jones-Jennings	392	2006–07
4	Larry Johnson	371	1974–75
5	Donald Newman	348	1983–84
6	Rashad Jones-Jennings	329	2005–06
7	Muntrelle Dobbins	320	1996–97
8	Curtis Kidd	309	1986–87
	Michael Clarke	309	1985–86
10	Michael Clarke	304	1984–85

Single game
Rank	Player	Rebounds	Season	Opponent
1	Charlie Johnson	31	1972–73	Baptist Christian
2	Rashad Jones-Jennings	30	2005–06	UAPB
3	Donald Newman	29	1983–84	Centenary
4	Charlie Johnson	28	1971–72	Millsaps
5	Charlie Johnson	25	1971–72	John Brown
6	Rashad Jones-Jennings	24	2006–07	ULM
	Charlie Johnson	24	1971–72	College of the Ozarks
8	Larry Johnson	23	1976–77	Southern (No.)
	Larry Johnson	23	1974–75	Evangel
	Charlie Johnson	23	1971–72	C.B.C
	Charlie Johnson	23	1971–72	Southwestern

== Assists ==
Career
Rank	Player	Assists	Seasons
1	Vaughn Williams	534	1979–80 1980–81 1981–82 1982–83
2	Derek Fisher	472	1992–93 1993–94 1994–95 1995–96
3	Josh Hagins	468	2012–13 2013–14 2014–15 2015–16
4	Juric Brown	428	1986–87 1987–88 1989–90
5	James Scott	423	1987–88 1988–89 1989–90 1990–91
6	Paul Springer	410	1985–86 1986–87 1987–88 1988–89
7	Markquis Nowell	335	2018–19 2019–20 2020–21
8	Cameron White	295	1972–73 1973–74
9	Zack Wright	282	2003–04 2004–05 2005–06
10	Carl Brown	272	1988–89 1989–90
	Jaizec Lottie	272	2017–18 2018–19 2019–20

Season
Rank	Player	Assists	Season
1	Juric Brown	217	1986–87
2	Robert Griffin	185	1975–76
3	Vaughn Williams	184	1982–83
4	Juric Brown	180	1987–88
5	Josh Hagins	165	2015–16
6	Zack Wright	164	2005–06
7	Carl Brown	163	1988–89
8	Paul Springer	161	1985–86
9	Ricky Hughes	160	1974–75
10	Derek Fisher	154	1995–96

Single game
Rank	Player	Assists	Season	Opponent
1	Carl Brown	18	1988–89	Centenary

== Steals ==
Career
Rank	Player	Steals	Seasons
1	Vaughn Williams	259	1979–80 1980–81 1981–82 1982–83
2	Derek Fisher	184	1992–93 1993–94 1994–95 1995–96
3	Josh Hagins	179	2012–13 2013–14 2014–15 2015–16
4	Juric Brown	165	1986–87 1987–88 1989–90
5	Markquis Nowell	133	2018–19 2019–20 2020–21
6	Muntrelle Dobbins	119	1993–94 1994–95 1995–96 1996–97
7	Nick Zachery	116	2000–01 2001–02 2002–03 2003–04
	Rod Wade	116	1989–90 1990–91 1991–92
9	James Scott	112	1987–88 1988–89 1989–90 1990–91
	Cameron White	112	1972–73 1973–74

Season
Rank	Player	Steals	Season
1	Vaughn Williams	79	1981–82
2	Juric Brown	77	1987–88
3	Vaughn Williams	71	1980–81
4	Juric Brown	68	1986–87
5	Jesse Massey	67	1980–81
6	Zack Wright	66	2005–06
7	Vaughn Williams	65	1982–83
8	Markquis Nowell	62	2019–20
9	Pete Myers	61	1984–85
10	Johnathan Lawson	59	2024–25

Single game
Rank	Player	Steals	Season	Opponent
1	Jesse Massey	9	1980–81	Arkansas State
2	Zack Wright	8	2005–06	Louisiana-Lafayette

== Blocks ==
Career
Rank	Player	Blocks	Seasons
1	Larry Johnson	265	1974–75 1975–76 1976–77 1977–78
2	Muntrelle Dobbins	158	1993–94 1994–95 1995–96 1996–97
3	Ruot Monyyong	102	2019–20 2020–21
4	Darius Eason	100	2000–01 2001–02 2002–03 2003–04 2004–05
	Ryan Moss	100	1997–98 1998–99
6	Tuongthach Gatkek	95	2024–25 2025–26
7	Tony Chime	90	1991–92 1992–93 1993–94 1994–95
8	Will Neighbour	85	2011–12 2012–13 2013–14
9	James White	81	2011–12 2012–13 2013–14 2014–15
	Michael Javes	81	2011–12 2012–13

Season
Rank	Player	Blocks	Season
1	Larry Johnson	113	1974–75
2	Larry Johnson	82	1976–77
3	Ruot Monyyong	62	2019–20
4	Ryan Moss	55	1997–98
5	Muntrelle Dobbins	52	1996–97
6	Tuongthach Gatkek	50	2025–26
7	Muntrelle Dobbins	46	1995–96
	Mwani Wilkinsom	46	2024–25
9	Ryan Moss	45	1998–99
	Tuongthach Gatkek	45	2024–25

Single game
Rank	Player	Blocks	Season	Opponent
1	Larry Johnson	11	1974–75	American Christian
