= 1989–90 Arkansas–Little Rock Trojans men's basketball team =

American college basketball season

1989–90 Arkansas–Little Rock Trojans men's basketball

TAAC tournament champions

NCAA tournament
- Conference: Trans America Athletic Conference
- Record: 20–10 (12–4 TAAC)
- Head coach: Mike Newell
- Home arena: Barton Coliseum

1989–90 Trans America Athletic Conference men's basketball standings
	Conf.				Overall
Team	W		L	PCT	W		L	PCT
Centenary	14	–	2	.875	22	–	8	.733
UTSA	13	–	3	.813	22	–	7	.759
Arkansas–Little Rock †	12	–	4	.750	20	–	10	.667
Georgia Southern	11	–	5	.688	17	–	11	.607
Stetson	8	–	8	.500	15	–	17	.469
Hardin–Simmons	5	–	11	.313	9	–	18	.333
Samford	4	–	12	.250	6	–	22	.214
Georgia State	3	–	13	.188	5	–	23	.179
Mercer	2	–	14	.125	7	–	20	.259
† 1990 TAAC tournament winner Rankings from AP Poll

The 1989–90 Arkansas–Little Rock Trojans men's basketball team represented the University of Arkansas at Little Rock during the 1989–90 NCAA Division I men's basketball season. The Trojans, led by head coach Mike Newell, played their home games at Barton Coliseum and were members of the Trans America Athletic Conference. They finished the season with a record of 20–10, 12–4 in TAAC play. They won the 1990 TAAC men's basketball tournament to earn an automatic bid in the 1990 NCAA Division I men's basketball tournament. They lost in the first round to eventual National champion UNLV, 102–72.

== Roster ==
1989–90 Little Rock Trojans men's basketball team
Players
Coaches

Pos.	#	Name	Height	Weight	Year	Hometown
G		Carl Brown	5 ft 10 in (1.78 m)	—	Sr
F		Derrick Owens	6 ft 4 in (1.93 m)	—	Sr
C		Jeff Cummings	6 ft 11 in (2.11 m)	—	Sr

Head coach

- Mike Newell

Assistant coach(es)

Legend

- (C) Team captain
- (S) Suspended
- (I) Ineligible
- (W) Walk-on
- Injured
- Current redshirt

== Schedule and results ==
Date time, TV	Rank^{#}	Opponent^{#}	Result	Record	Site (attendance) city, state
Regular season
Dec 2, 1989*		UTEP	W 85–62	2–0	Barton Coliseum; Little Rock, Arkansas
Dec 29, 1989*		vs. Princeton	L 56–59	4–3	
Jan 9, 1990*		at No. 4 Oklahoma	L 81–134	7–4	Lloyd Noble Center; Norman, Oklahoma
TAAC tournament
Mar 6, 1990*		Hardin-Simmons; TAAC Tournament Quarterfinal	W 91–68	18–9	Barton Coliseum; Little Rock, Arkansas
Mar 7, 1990*		Texas-San Antonio; TAAC Tournament Semifinal	W 99–83	19–9	Barton Coliseum; Little Rock, Arkansas
Mar 8, 1990*		Centenary; TAAC tournament championship	W 105–95	20–9	Barton Coliseum; Little Rock, Arkansas
NCAA tournament
Mar 15, 1990*	(16 W)	vs. (1 W) No. 2 UNLV; First Round	L 72–102	20–10	Jon M. Huntsman Center; Salt Lake City, Utah
*Non-conference game. ^{#}Rankings from AP Poll. (#) Tournament seedings in parentheses. W=West. All times are in Eastern Time.
