= 1988–89 Arkansas–Little Rock Trojans men's basketball team =

American college basketball season

1988–89 Arkansas–Little Rock Trojans men's basketball

TAAC tournament champions

NCAA tournament
- Conference: Trans America Athletic Conference
- Record: 23–8 (14–4 TAAC)
- Head coach: Mike Newell
- Home arena: Barton Coliseum

1988–89 Trans America Athletic Conference men's basketball standings
	Conf.				Overall
Team	W		L	PCT	W		L	PCT
Georgia Southern	16	–	2	.889	23	–	6	.793
Arkansas–Little Rock †	14	–	4	.778	23	–	8	.742
Stetson	10	–	8	.556	17	–	12	.586
Centenary (LA)	9	–	9	.500	16	–	14	.533
Georgia State	9	–	9	.500	14	–	14	.500
Mercer	9	–	9	.500	14	–	14	.500
UTSA	8	–	10	.444	15	–	13	.536
Houston Baptist	6	–	12	.333	9	–	20	.310
Samford	5	–	13	.278	8	–	19	.296
Hardin-Simmons	4	–	14	.222	8	–	19	.296
† 1989 TAAC tournament winner Rankings from AP Poll

The 1988–89 Arkansas–Little Rock Trojans men's basketball team represented the University of Arkansas at Little Rock during the 1988–89 NCAA Division I men's basketball season. The Trojans, led by head coach Mike Newell, played their home games at Barton Coliseum and were members of the Trans America Athletic Conference. They finished the season with a record of 23–8, 14–4 in TAAC play. They won the 1989 TAAC men's basketball tournament to earn an automatic bid in the 1989 NCAA Division I men's basketball tournament. They lost in the first round to Louisville, 76–71.

== Roster ==
1988–89 Little Rock Trojans men's basketball team
Players
Coaches

Pos.	#	Name	Height	Weight	Year	Hometown
G		Carl Brown	5 ft 10 in (1.78 m)	—	Jr
G		Paul Springer	6 ft 2 in (1.88 m)	—	Sr
F		Derrick Owens	6 ft 4 in (1.93 m)	—	Jr
C		Jeff Cummings	6 ft 11 in (2.11 m)	—	Jr

Head coach

- Mike Newell

Assistant coach(es)

Legend

- (C) Team captain
- (S) Suspended
- (I) Ineligible
- (W) Walk-on
- Injured
- Current redshirt

== Schedule and results ==
Date time, TV	Rank^{#}	Opponent^{#}	Result	Record	Site (attendance) city, state
Regular season
Nov 30, 1988*		Houston	W 100–67	1–0	Barton Coliseum (6,851); Little Rock, Arkansas
Dec 5, 1988*		Texas Southern	W 114–79	2–0	Barton Coliseum (5,671); Little Rock, Arkansas
Dec 8, 1988*		Colorado	W 91–66	3–0	Barton Coliseum (7,021); Little Rock, Arkansas
Dec 9, 1988*		vs. Southern California; Illini Classic	W 94–86	4–0	Assembly Hall (2,000); Champaign, Illinois
Dec 10, 1988*		at No. 7 Illinois; Illini Classic	L 88–107	4–1	Assembly Hall (14,887); Champaign, Illinois
Dec 14, 1988*		at Indiana	L 77–105	4–2	Assembly Hall (14,132); Bloomington, Indiana
Dec 17, 1988		Stetson	W 88–70	5–2 (1–0)	Barton Coliseum (5,580); Little Rock, Arkansas
Dec 19, 1988		Georgia Southern	W 94–74	6–2 (2–0)	Barton Coliseum (5,421); Little Rock, Arkansas
Dec 22, 1988*		at No. 7 Oklahoma	L 96–115	6–3	Lloyd Noble Center (9,683); Norman, Oklahoma
Dec 30, 1988*		Southern	W 112–104	7–3	Barton Coliseum (5,421); Little Rock, Arkansas
Dec 31, 1988*		Marshall	W 89–79	8–3	Barton Coliseum (5,199); Little Rock, Arkansas
Jan 5, 1989		at Texas-San Antonio	L 73–74	8–4 (2–1)	Convocation Center (4,258); San Antonio, Texas
Jan 7, 1989		at Hardin-Simmons	W 97–77	9–4 (3–1)	Mabee Complex (1,769); Abilene, Texas
Jan 12, 1989		Houston Baptist	W 112–73	10–4 (4–1)	Barton Coliseum (5,438); Little Rock, Arkansas
Jan 14, 1989		Centenary	W 113–83	11–4 (5–1)	Barton Coliseum (6,485); Little Rock, Arkansas
Jan 21, 1989		at Samford	W 87–84	12–4 (6–1)	Seibert Hall (1,413); Homewood, Alabama
Jan 26, 1989		at Georgia State	W 102–91	13–4 (7–1)	GSU Sports Arena (1,163); Atlanta, Georgia
Jan 28, 1989		at Mercer	W 103–82	14–4 (8–1)	Porter Gym (2,020); Macon, Georgia
Feb 2, 1989		Hardin-Simmons	W 117–80	15–4 (9–1)	Barton Coliseum (5,445); Little Rock, Arkansas
Feb 4, 1989		Texas-San Antonio	W 94–78	16–4 (10–1)	Barton Coliseum (5,544); Little Rock, Arkansas
Feb 9, 1989		at Centenary	L 113–114	16–5 (10–2)	Gold Dome (2,987); Shreveport, Louisiana
Feb 11, 1989		at Houston Baptist	W 76–64	17–5 (11–2)	Sharp Gymnasium (967); Houston, Texas
Feb 18, 1989		Samford	W 73–62	18–5 (12–2)	Barton Coliseum (6,111); Little Rock, Arkansas
Feb 23, 1989		Mercer	L 72–75	18–6 (12–3)	Barton Coliseum (5,112); Little Rock, Arkansas
Feb 25, 1989		Georgia State	W 107–79	19–6 (13–3)	Barton Coliseum (5,669); Little Rock, Arkansas
Mar 2, 1989		at Stetson	L 78–87	19–7 (13–4)	Edmunds Center (3,100); DeLand, Florida
Mar 4, 1989		at Georgia Southern	W 80–63	20–7 (14–4)	Hanner Fieldhouse (5,303); Statesboro, Georgia
TAAC tournament
Mar 7, 1989*		Texas-San Antonio; TAAC Tournament Quarterfinal	W 82–79	21–7	Barton Coliseum (4,545); Little Rock, Arkansas
Mar 8, 1989*		Stetson; TAAC Tournament Semifinal	W 60–59	22–7	Barton Coliseum (5,625); Little Rock, Arkansas
Mar 9, 1989*		Centenary; TAAC tournament championship	W 100–72	23–7	Barton Coliseum (6,169); Little Rock, Arkansas
NCAA tournament
Mar 16, 1989*	(13 MW)	vs. (4 MW) No. 12 Louisville; First Round	L 71–76	23–8	RCA Dome (37,232); Indianapolis, Indiana
*Non-conference game. ^{#}Rankings from AP Poll. (#) Tournament seedings in parentheses. MW=Midwest. All times are in Eastern Time.
