= 1985–86 Arkansas–Little Rock Trojans men's basketball team =

American college basketball season

1985–86 Arkansas–Little Rock Trojans men's basketball

TAAC Regular season champions TAAC tournament champions

NCAA tournament, second round
- Conference: Trans America Athletic Conference
- Record: 23–11 (12–2 TAAC)
- Head coach: Mike Newell (2nd season)
- Home arena: Barton Coliseum

1985–86 Trans America Athletic Conference men's basketball standings
	Conf.				Overall
Team	W		L	PCT	W		L	PCT
Arkansas–Little Rock †	12	–	2	.857	23	–	11	.676
Samford	8	–	6	.571	16	–	13	.552
Houston Baptist	7	–	7	.500	14	–	14	.500
Hardin–Simmons	7	–	7	.500	15	–	13	.536
Mercer	6	–	8	.429	15	–	14	.517
Centenary	6	–	8	.429	13	–	17	.433
Georgia Southern	6	–	8	.429	15	–	13	.536
Georgia State	4	–	10	.286	10	–	18	.357
Stetson	-	–	-	–	10	–	18	.357
† 1986 TAAC tournament winner Rankings from AP Poll

The 1985–86 Arkansas–Little Rock Trojans men's basketball team represented the University of Arkansas at Little Rock during the 1985–86 NCAA Division I men's basketball season. The Trojans, led by head coach Mike Newell, played their home games at Barton Coliseum and were members of the Trans America Athletic Conference. They finished the season with a record of 23–11, 12–2 in TAAC play. They won the 1986 TAAC men's basketball tournament to earn an automatic bid in the 1986 NCAA Division I men's basketball tournament. After knocking off No. 3 seed Notre Dame in the opening round, the Trojans lost to NC State, 80–66 in 2OT, in the round of 32.

With the NCAA Tournament's expansion to 64 teams the year prior, Arkansas–Little Rock joined Cleveland State as the first No. 14 seeds to defeat a No. 3 seed. Cleveland State followed their opening round victory with another to become the first No. 14 seed to reach the Sweet Sixteen.

== Roster ==
1985–86 Little Rock Trojans men's basketball team
Players
Coaches

Pos.	#	Name	Height	Weight	Year	Hometown
G		Myron Jackson	6 ft 3 in (1.91 m)	180 lb (82 kg)	Sr	Hamburg, Arkansas
G		Pete Myers	6 ft 6 in (1.98 m)	175 lb (79 kg)	Sr	Mobile, Alabama
G		Paul Springer	6 ft 2 in (1.88 m)	—	Fr

Head coach

- Mike Newell

Assistant coach(es)

Legend

- (C) Team captain
- (S) Suspended
- (I) Ineligible
- (W) Walk-on
- Injured
- Current redshirt

== Schedule and results ==
Date time, TV	Rank^{#}	Opponent^{#}	Result	Record	Site (attendance) city, state
Regular season
Nov 24, 1985*		vs. Iowa	L 99–108	0–1	Neal S. Blaisdell Center; Honolulu, Hawaii
Dec 4, 1985*		Middle Tennessee	W 72–70	1–1	Barton Coliseum; Little Rock, Arkansas
Dec 13, 1985*		vs. George Mason; Marshall Memorial Inivitational	W 70–67	2–1	Cam Henderson Center; Huntington, West Virginia
Dec 14, 1985*		at Marshall; Marshall Memorial Invitational	L 76–79	2–2	Cam Henderson Center; Huntington, West Virginia
Dec 18, 1985*		Southeastern Louisiana	L 62–69	2–3	Barton Coliseum; Little Rock, Arkansas
Dec 23, 1985*		at Providence	L 80–104	2–4	Providence Civic Center; Providence, Rhode Island
Dec 28, 1985*		UTSA	W 87–67	3–4	Barton Coliseum; Little Rock, Arkansas
Dec 30, 1985*		at Northwestern State	L 61–68	3–5	Prather Coliseum; Natchitoches, Louisiana
Jan 3, 1986*		vs. Southeastern Louisiana; Sooner Invitational	L 64–66	3–6	Lloyd Noble Center; Norman, Oklahoma
Jan 4, 1986*		vs. Austin Peay; Sooner Invitational	L 67–75	3–7	Lloyd Noble Center; Norman, Oklahoma
Jan 6, 1986		Hardin-Simmons	L 56–61	3–8 (0–1)	Barton Coliseum; Little Rock, Arkansas
Feb 24, 1986		Georgia State	W 86–65	18–9 (12–2)	Barton Coliseum; Little Rock, Arkansas
TAAC tournament
Mar 1, 1986*	(1)	(8) Georgia State; Quarterfinals	W 115–82	19–9	Barton Coliseum; Little Rock, Arkansas
Mar 2, 1986*	(1)	(5) Mercer; Semifinals	W 81–66	20–9	Barton Coliseum; Little Rock, Arkansas
Mar 3, 1986*	(1)	(6) Centenary; Championship game	W 85–63	21–9	Barton Coliseum; Little Rock, Arkansas
NCAA tournament
Mar 14, 1986*	(14 MW)	vs. (3 MW) No. 10 Notre Dame; First Round	W 90–83	22–9	Hubert H. Humphrey Metrodome; Minneapolis, Minnesota
Mar 16, 1986*	(14 MW)	vs. (6 MW) NC State; Second Round	L 66–80 ^{2OT}	22–10	Hubert H. Humphrey Metrodome; Minneapolis, Minnesota
*Non-conference game. ^{#}Rankings from AP Poll. (#) Tournament seedings in parentheses. MW=Midwest. All times are in Eastern Time.

== Awards and honors ==
- Myron Jackson – TAAC Player of the Year
- Mike Newell – TAAC Coach of the Year
