= NCAA Division I men's basketball tournament upsets =

List of Men's D1 NCAA tournament upsets

An upset is a victory by an underdog team. In the context of the NCAA Division I men's basketball tournament, a single-elimination tournament, this generally constitutes a team defeating an opponent with a substantially higher seed. The NCAA defines a tournament upset as a victory by a team seeded five or more lines below the opponent that it defeats.

This is a list of victories since the tournament expanded to 64 teams in 1985. Teams with victories listed won games seeded No. 11 or lower in the Round of 64, seeded No. 7 or lower in the Round of 32 or the Sweet Sixteen, or seeded No. 6 or lower in the Elite Eight, Final Four, or national championship. All teams are listed by athletic brand names they used at the time of their wins, which do not always match those in use today.

== Most successful low seeds ==
The table below lists the best outcomes for low-seeded teams since the tournament's expansion in 1985, sorted by the round in which that team was eliminated.

| Seed | Second Round | Sweet Sixteen | Elite Eight | Final Four | Championship Game | National Champion |
|---|---|---|---|---|---|---|
| No. 16 | UMBC (2018); Fairleigh Dickinson (2023) | – | – | – | – | – |
| No. 15 | Richmond (1991); Santa Clara (1993); Coppin State (1997); Hampton (2001); Lehigh (2012); Norfolk State (2012); Middle Tennessee (2016) | Florida Gulf Coast (2013); Oral Roberts (2021); Princeton (2023) | Saint Peter's (2022) | – | – | – |
| No. 14 | numerous (21 teams) | Cleveland State (1986); Chattanooga (1997) | – | – | – | – |
| No. 13 | numerous (27 teams) | Richmond (1988); Valparaiso (1998); Oklahoma (1999); Bradley (2006); Ohio (2012); La Salle (2013) | – | – | – | – |
| No. 12 | numerous (36 teams) | numerous (20 teams) | Missouri (2002); Oregon State (2021) | – | – | – |
| No. 11 | numerous (36 teams) | numerous (18 teams) | Loyola Marymount (1990); Temple (2001); Dayton (2014); Xavier (2017) | LSU (1986); George Mason (2006); VCU (2011); Loyola Chicago (2018); UCLA (2021); NC State (2024) | – | – |
| No. 10 | —N/a | numerous (16 teams) | LSU (1987); Texas (1990); Temple (1991); Providence (1997); Gonzaga (1999); Kent State (2002); Davidson (2008); Miami (FL) (2022) | Syracuse (2016) | – | – |
| No. 9 | —N/a | UTEP (1992); UAB (2004); Northern Iowa (2010) | Boston College (1994); Kansas State (2018); Florida State (2018); Iowa (2026) | Wichita State (2013); Florida Atlantic (2023) | – | – |
| No. 8 | —N/a | North Carolina (1990); Georgia (1996); UCLA (2002); NC State (2015); Wisconsin (2017); Loyola Chicago (2021); Arkansas (2023) | Auburn (1986); Rhode Island (1998); Alabama (2004) | North Carolina (2000); Wisconsin (2000) | Butler (2011); Kentucky (2014); North Carolina (2022) | Villanova (1985) |
| No. 7 | —N/a | numerous (19 teams) | Navy (1986); Temple (1993); Tulsa (2000); Michigan State (2003); Xavier (2004); West Virginia (2005); Florida (2012) | Michigan State (2015); South Carolina (2017) | – | UConn (2014) |
| No. 6 | —N/a | —N/a | —N/a | Providence (1987) | Michigan (1992) | Kansas (1988) |

=== Lowest-seeded pairings by round ===
- The lowest-seeded combination in the national championship game is the 2014 pairing of No. 7 seed UConn and No. 8 seed Kentucky. UConn won and became the second-lowest-seeded team to win the tournament.
- The pairing of No. 8 seed Butler and No. 11 seed VCU in the 2011 National semifinals game was the lowest seeded combination to play in a National semifinals game.
- The pairing of No. 8 seed North Carolina and No. 15 seed Saint Peter's in the 2022 East Regional final was the lowest-seeded combination to play in a regional final.
- The pairing of No. 10 seed Providence and No. 14 seed Chattanooga in the 1997 Southeast Regional semifinal was the lowest-seeded combination to play in a regional semifinal.
- There have been twenty-five Round of 32 matchups between two seeds who had won as the underdogs in the Round of 64: twelve 12-13 matchups, six 11-14 matchups, five 10-15 matchups, and two 9-16 matchups. The seeds add to 25 in each case, which is the lowest possible total for the Second Round.

=== Additional low-seed stats ===
- Villanova in 1985, a No. 8 seed, was the lowest seeded team to win the tournament.
- Penn's 1979 Final Four appearance as a No. 9 seed—out of 10 teams in their region—made them the lowest seed to make the Final Four in the pre-64-team era.
- Butler is the only team to make consecutive Final Fours (let alone Championship Games) while not being a No. 1 or No. 2 seed either time (No. 5 in 2010, No. 8 in 2011).
- In 1989, the four 11-seeds swept the First Round against their 6-seed opponents. As of 2023 this is the only time that 11-seeds have achieved this feat, and no lower seed ever has. Three out of four 12-seeds have advanced five times, in 2002, 2009, 2013, 2014, and 2019. The 10-seeds also swept the 7-seeds once, in 1999.
- Richmond is the only team to win first-round games ranked as a No. 15, No. 14, No. 13, and No. 12 seed.
- The most Round of 64 upsets over top-3 seeds occurring in a single tournament has been two, which has occurred ten times:
  - 1986, 1995, 2015: Two No. 14 seeds over No. 3 seeds
  - 1991, 1997, 2013, 2016, 2021: One No. 15 seed over a No. 2 seed and one No. 14 seed over a No. 3 seed
    - In 1991, 2013, 2016, and 2021, at least one team of every seed between No. 1 and No. 15 advanced to the Round of 32.
  - 2012: Two No. 15 seeds over No. 2 seeds
  - 2023: One No. 16 seed over a No. 1 seed and one No. 15 seed over a No. 2 seed
- 2014 produced the highest total seed differential in an NCAA Tournament, with 128 across all the rounds of play. That is, the sum of seed differences among the 19 games won by lower-seeded teams was 128. This surpassed the previous mark of 111 in 2014, in which 22 games were won by lower seeded teams.
- 2013 was the only tournament to have three teams seeded No. 12 or lower in the Sweet Sixteen: No. 12 Oregon, No. 13 La Salle, and No. 15 Florida Gulf Coast.
- The 2018 South Region was the first region since seeding began in 1979 in which no top-4 seed advanced to the Sweet Sixteen (No. 5 Kentucky, No. 7 Nevada, No. 9 Kansas State, No. 11 Loyola–Chicago).
- Georgetown is the only team to lose in five consecutive tournament appearances against a team seeded at least five spots lower:
  - 2008 (Round of 32): No. 10 Davidson 74, No. 2 Georgetown 70.
  - 2010 (Round of 64): No. 14 Ohio 97, No. 3 Georgetown 83.
  - 2011 (Round of 64): No. 11 VCU 74, No. 6 Georgetown 56.
  - 2012 (Round of 32): No. 11 NC State 66, No. 3 Georgetown 63.
  - 2013 (Round of 64): No. 15 Florida Gulf Coast 78, No. 2 Georgetown 68.
- In 2021, Houston, a 2 seed, was the first team ever to reach the Final Four by defeating only double-digit seeds—in order, Cleveland State (15), Rutgers (10), Syracuse (11), and Oregon State (12).
- 2021 featured 14 upsets, the most upsets in a single tournament. NCAA defines an upset as 5 seed lines or more between teams.

=== Point-spread upsets ===
==== Biggest point-spread upsets since 1985 ====
- Fairleigh Dickinson +23.5 over Purdue 63–58 in 2023
- Norfolk State +21.5 over Missouri 86–84 in 2012
- UMBC +20.5 over Virginia 74–54 in 2018
- Santa Clara +20 over Arizona 64–61 in 1993
- Coppin State +18.5 over South Carolina 78–65 in 1997
- Saint Peter's +18 over Kentucky 85–79 in 2022
- Arkansas–Little Rock +17.5 over Notre Dame 90–83 in 1986
- Hampton +17.5 over Iowa State 58–57 in 2001

==== Biggest championship game point-spread upsets ====
- Connecticut +9.5 over Duke, 77–74, in 1999
- Villanova +9 over Georgetown, 66–64, in 1985
- Kansas +8 over Oklahoma, 83–79, in 1988
- North Carolina State +7.5 over Houston, 54–52 in 1983
- Texas Western +6.5 over Kentucky, 72–65 in 1966

== Most upset wins ==
| Team | Wins | Years |
|---|---|---|
| NC State | 7 | 2005, 2012(2), 2015, 2024(3) |
| Xavier | 7 | 1987, 1991, 2004(2), 2017(3) |
| Gonzaga | 6 | 1999, 2000, 2001, 2011, 2016(2) |
| Richmond | 6 | 1988(2), 1991, 1998, 2011, 2022 |
| VCU | 6 | 2007, 2011(3), 2012, 2026 |
| UCLA | 6 | 1990, 2002, 2015, 2021(3) |
| LSU | 6 | 1986(4), 1987(2) |
| Dayton | 5 | 1990, 2009, 2014(2), 2015 |
| Oregon | 5 | 2013(2), 2019, 2021, 2024 |
| Syracuse | 5 | 2016, 2018(2), 2021(2) |
| Kentucky | 5 | 1985(2), 2014(3) |

== Most upset losses ==
| Team | Losses | Year(s) |
|---|---|---|
| Kansas | 11 | 1985, 1990, 1992, 1998, 2005, 2006, 2010, 2011, 2014, 2015, 2023 |
| Wisconsin | 11 | 1999, 2001, 2007, 2008, 2010, 2013, 2014, 2019, 2022, 2024, 2026 |
| Arizona | 10 | 1990, 1992, 1993, 1995, 1999, 2000, 2016, 2017, 2018, 2023 |
| Duke | 9 | 1985, 1997, 2007, 2008, 2012, 2014, 2017, 2022, 2024 |
| Purdue | 9 | 1985, 1986, 1990, 1996, 2011, 2016, 2021, 2022, 2023 |
| Oklahoma | 8 | 1986, 1988, 1990, 1992, 1995, 2001, 2006, 2014 |
| Virginia | 8 | 1986, 1987, 2001, 2015, 2016, 2018, 2021, 2023 |
| Georgetown | 7 | 1985, 1987, 2008, 2010, 2011, 2012, 2013 |
| North Carolina | 7 | 1985, 1994, 1999, 2001, 2006, 2018, 2026 |
| Syracuse | 7 | 1986, 1988, 1991, 2005, 2006, 2011, 2014 |
| Marquette | 6 | 1996, 2002, 2010, 2019, 2023, 2024 |
| Missouri | 6 | 1987, 1988, 1990, 2012, 2023, 2025 |
| UCLA | 6 | 1987, 1991, 1994, 1996, 1999, 2013 |
| Alabama | 5 | 1989, 2002, 2005, 2021, 2022 |
| Indiana | 5 | 1986, 1988, 1996, 2000, 2001 |
| Kansas State | 5 | 1989, 1993, 2013, 2019, 2023 |
| Villanova | 5 | 1995, 2010, 2014, 2015, 2017 |

== Round of 64 ==
This round was called the First Round until 2011, when the introduction of the First Four caused it to be renamed the Second Round. Starting with the 2016 tournament, it returned to being called the First Round. There were eight official First Round upsets in 2016, which was the most in tournament history.

Detail between each pair of seeds in this section has been updated as of completion of the 2026 Round of 64, representing 164 games played between each pair.

=== 16 defeats 1 ===
There have been two games in which a No. 16 seed has defeated a No. 1 seed (1.22%) since 1985:

| Year | Winner | Loser | Score |
|---|---|---|---|
| 2018 | UMBC | Virginia | 74–54 |
| 2023 | Fairleigh Dickinson | Purdue | 63–58 |

=== 15 defeats 2 ===
There have been 11 games in which a No. 15 seed has defeated a No. 2 seed (6.71%) since 1985:

| Year | Winner | Loser | Score |
|---|---|---|---|
| 1991 | Richmond | Syracuse | 73–69 |
| 1993 | Santa Clara | Arizona | 64–61 |
| 1997 | Coppin State | South Carolina | 78–65 |
| 2001 | Hampton | Iowa State | 58–57 |
| 2012 | Lehigh | Duke | 75–70 |
| 2012 | Norfolk State | Missouri | 86–84 |
| 2013 | Florida Gulf Coast | Georgetown | 78–68 |
| 2016 | Middle Tennessee | Michigan State | 90–81 |
| 2021 | Oral Roberts | Ohio State | 75–72^{OT} |
| 2022 | Saint Peter's | Kentucky | 85–79^{OT} |
| 2023 | Princeton | Arizona | 59–55 |

=== 14 defeats 3 ===
There have been 23 games in which a No. 14 seed has defeated a No. 3 seed (14.02%) since 1985:

| Year | Winner | Loser | Score |
|---|---|---|---|
| 1986 | Cleveland State | Indiana | 83–79 |
| 1986 | Arkansas–Little Rock (Note: Known athletically as Little Rock since 2015–16.) | Notre Dame | 90–83 |
| 1987 | Austin Peay | Illinois | 68–67 |
| 1988 | Murray State | NC State | 78–75 |
| 1989 | Siena | Stanford | 80–78 |
| 1990 | Northern Iowa | Missouri | 74–71 |
| 1991 | Xavier | Nebraska | 89–84 |
| 1992 | East Tennessee State | Arizona | 87–80 |
| 1995 | Old Dominion | Villanova | 89–81^{3 OT} |
| 1995 | Weber State | Michigan State | 79–72 |
| 1997 | Chattanooga | Georgia | 73–70 |
| 1998 | Richmond | South Carolina | 62–61 |
| 1999 | Weber State | North Carolina | 76–74 |
| 2005 | Bucknell | Kansas | 64–63 |
| 2006 | Northwestern State | Iowa | 64–63 |
| 2010 | Ohio | Georgetown | 97–83 |
| 2013 | Harvard | New Mexico | 68–62 |
| 2014 | Mercer | Duke | 78–71 |
| 2015 | Georgia State | Baylor | 57–56 |
| 2015 | UAB | Iowa State | 60–59 |
| 2016 | Stephen F. Austin | West Virginia | 70–56 |
| 2021 | Abilene Christian | Texas | 53–52 |
| 2024 | Oakland | Kentucky | 80–76 |

=== 13 defeats 4 ===
There have been 33 games in which a No. 13 seed has defeated a No. 4 seed (20.12%) since 1985:

| Year | Winner | Loser | Score |
|---|---|---|---|
| 1985 | Navy | LSU | 78–55 |
| 1987 | Xavier | Missouri | 70–69 |
| 1987 | SW Missouri State | Clemson | 65–60 |
| 1988 | Richmond | Indiana | 72–69 |
| 1989 | Middle Tennessee | Florida State | 97–83 |
| 1991 | Penn State | UCLA | 74–69 |
| 1992 | Southwestern Louisiana (Note: Now known athletically as Louisiana.) | Oklahoma | 87–83 |
| 1993 | Southern | Georgia Tech | 93–78 |
| 1995 | Manhattan | Oklahoma | 77–67 |
| 1996 | Princeton | UCLA | 43–41 |
| 1998 | Valparaiso | Ole Miss | 70–69 |
| 1999 | Oklahoma | Arizona | 61–60 |
| 2001 | Kent State | Indiana | 77–73 |
| 2001 | Indiana State | Oklahoma | 70–68^{OT} |
| 2002 | UNC Wilmington | USC | 93–89^{OT} |
| 2003 | Tulsa | Dayton | 84–71 |
| 2005 | Vermont | Syracuse | 60–57^{OT} |
| 2006 | Bradley | Kansas | 77–73 |
| 2008 | Siena | Vanderbilt | 83–62 |
| 2008 | San Diego | Connecticut (Note: Known athletically as UConn since 2013–14.) | 70–69^{OT} |
| 2009 | Cleveland State | Wake Forest | 84–69 |
| 2010 | Murray State | Vanderbilt | 66–65 |
| 2011 | Morehead State | Louisville | 62–61 |
| 2012 | Ohio | Michigan | 65–60 |
| 2013 | La Salle | Kansas State | 63–61 |
| 2016 | Hawaii | California | 77–66 |
| 2018 | Marshall | Wichita State | 81–75 |
| 2018 | Buffalo | Arizona | 89–68 |
| 2019 | UC Irvine | Kansas State | 70–64 |
| 2021 | Ohio | Virginia | 62–58 |
| 2021 | North Texas | Purdue | 78–69^{OT} |
| 2023 | Furman | Virginia | 68–67 |
| 2024 | Yale | Auburn | 78–76 |

=== 12 defeats 5 ===
There have been 58 games in which a No. 12 seed has defeated a No. 5 seed (34.76%) since 1985:

| Year | Winner | Loser | Score |
|---|---|---|---|
| 1985 | Kentucky | Washington | 66–58 |
| 1986 | DePaul | Virginia | 72–68 |
| 1987 | Wyoming | Virginia | 64–60 |
| 1989 | DePaul | Memphis State (Note: Known as Memphis since 1994–95.) | 66–63 |
| 1990 | Dayton | Illinois | 88–86 |
| 1990 | Ball State | Oregon State | 54–53 |
| 1991 | Eastern Michigan | Mississippi State | 76–56 |
| 1992 | New Mexico State (Note: New Mexico State vacated its appearance in the 1992 NCAA tournament due to sanctions from the Neil McCarthy scandal.) | DePaul | 81–73 |
| 1993 | George Washington | New Mexico | 82–68 |
| 1994 | Wisconsin–Green Bay (Note: Now known athletically as Green Bay.) | California | 61–57 |
| 1994 | Tulsa | UCLA | 112–102 |
| 1995 | Miami (OH) | Arizona | 71–62 |
| 1996 | Drexel | Memphis State | 75–63 |
| 1996 | Arkansas | Penn State | 86–80 |
| 1997 | College of Charleston | Maryland | 75–66 |
| 1998 | Florida State | TCU | 96–87 |
| 1999 | SW Missouri State | Wisconsin | 43–32 |
| 1999 | Detroit (Note: Although this institution has been known as Detroit Mercy since a 1990 merger, it did not add "Mercy" to its athletic brand name until 2017.) | UCLA | 56–53 |
| 2001 | Gonzaga (Note: Entered the game as the betting favorite in Las Vegas sports books.) | Virginia | 86–85 |
| 2001 | Utah State | Ohio State | 77–68^{OT} |
| 2002 | Creighton | Florida | 83–82^{2 OT} |
| 2002 | Tulsa | Marquette | 71–69 |
| 2002 | Missouri | Miami (FL) | 93–80 |
| 2003 | Butler | Mississippi State | 47–46 |
| 2004 | Manhattan | Florida | 75–60 |
| 2004 | Pacific | Providence | 66–58 |
| 2005 | Milwaukee | Alabama | 83–73 |
| 2006 | Montana | Nevada | 87–79 |
| 2006 | Texas A&M (Note: Entered the game as pick'em (even money) in Las Vegas sports books.) | Syracuse | 66–58 |
| 2008 | Villanova | Clemson | 75–69 |
| 2008 | Western Kentucky | Drake | 101–99^{OT} |
| 2009 | Wisconsin | Florida State | 61–59^{OT} |
| 2009 | Arizona | Utah | 84–71 |
| 2009 | Western Kentucky | Illinois | 76–72 |
| 2010 | Cornell | Temple | 78–65 |
| 2011 | Richmond | Vanderbilt | 69–66 |
| 2012 | South Florida | Temple | 58–44 |
| 2012 | VCU | Wichita State | 62–59 |
| 2013 | Ole Miss | Wisconsin | 57–46 |
| 2013 | California | UNLV | 64–61 |
| 2013 | Oregon | Oklahoma State | 68–55 |
| 2014 | Stephen F. Austin | VCU | 77–75^{OT} |
| 2014 | North Dakota State | Oklahoma | 80–75^{OT} |
| 2014 | Harvard | Cincinnati | 61–57 |
| 2016 | Little Rock | Purdue | 85–83^{2 OT} |
| 2016 | Yale | Baylor | 79–75 |
| 2017 | Middle Tennessee | Minnesota | 81–72 |
| 2019 | Murray State | Marquette | 83–64 |
| 2019 | Oregon | Wisconsin | 72–54 |
| 2019 | Liberty | Mississippi State | 80–76 |
| 2021 | Oregon State | Tennessee | 70–56 |
| 2022 | Richmond | Iowa | 67–63 |
| 2022 | New Mexico State | UConn | 70–63 |
| 2024 | James Madison | Wisconsin | 72–61 |
| 2024 | Grand Canyon | Saint Mary's | 75–66 |
| 2025 | McNeese | Clemson | 69–67 |
| 2025 | Colorado State | Memphis | 78–70 |
| 2026 | High Point | Wisconsin | 83–82 |

=== 11 defeats 6 ===
There have been 64 games in which a No. 11 seed has defeated a No. 6 seed (37.8%) since 1985:

| Year | Winner | Loser | Score |
|---|---|---|---|
| 1985 | Boston College | Texas Tech | 55–53 |
| 1985 | UTEP | Tulsa | 79–75 |
| 1985 | Auburn | Purdue | 59–58 |
| 1986 | LSU | Purdue | 94–87^{OT} |
| 1988 | Rhode Island | Missouri | 87–80 |
| 1989 | Minnesota | Kansas State | 86–75 |
| 1989 | Evansville | Oregon State | 94–90^{OT} |
| 1989 | South Alabama | Alabama | 86–84 |
| 1989 | Texas | Georgia Tech | 76–70 |
| 1990 | Loyola Marymount | New Mexico State | 111–92 |
| 1991 | Creighton | New Mexico State | 64–56 |
| 1991 | Connecticut | LSU | 79–62 |
| 1993 | Tulane | Kansas State | 55–53 |
| 1994 | Penn | Nebraska | 90–80 |
| 1995 | Texas | Oregon | 90–73 |
| 1996 | Boston College | Indiana | 64–51 |
| 1998 | Washington | Xavier | 69–68 |
| 1998 | Western Michigan | Clemson | 75–72 |
| 2000 | Pepperdine | Indiana | 77–57 |
| 2001 | Georgia State | Wisconsin | 50–49 |
| 2001 | Temple | Texas | 79–65 |
| 2002 | Wyoming | Gonzaga | 73–68 |
| 2002 | Southern Illinois | Texas Tech | 76–68 |
| 2003 | Central Michigan | Creighton | 79–73 |
| 2005 | UAB | LSU | 82–68 |
| 2006 | Milwaukee | Oklahoma | 82–74 |
| 2006 | George Mason | Michigan State | 75–65 |
| 2007 | Winthrop | Notre Dame | 76–64 |
| 2007 | VCU | Duke | 79–77 |
| 2008 | Kansas State | USC | 80–67 |
| 2009 | Dayton | West Virginia | 68–62 |
| 2010 | Washington | Marquette | 80–78 |
| 2010 | Old Dominion | Notre Dame | 51–50 |
| 2011 | Marquette | Xavier | 66–55 |
| 2011 | VCU | Georgetown | 74–56 |
| 2011 | Gonzaga | St. John's | 86–71 |
| 2012 | Colorado | UNLV | 68–64 |
| 2012 | North Carolina State | San Diego State | 79–65 |
| 2013 | Minnesota | UCLA | 83–63 |
| 2014 | Tennessee | UMass | 86–67 |
| 2014 | Dayton | Ohio State | 60–59 |
| 2015 | Dayton | Providence | 66–53 |
| 2015 | UCLA | SMU | 60–59 |
| 2016 | Northern Iowa | Texas | 75–72 |
| 2016 | Gonzaga | Seton Hall | 68–52 |
| 2016 | Wichita State | Arizona | 65–55 |
| 2017 | Rhode Island | Creighton | 84–72 |
| 2017 | USC | SMU | 66–65 |
| 2017 | Xavier | Maryland | 76–65 |
| 2018 | Loyola Chicago | Miami (FL) | 64–62 |
| 2018 | Syracuse | TCU | 57–52 |
| 2019 | Ohio State | Iowa State | 62–59 |
| 2021 | UCLA | BYU | 73–62 |
| 2021 | Syracuse | San Diego State | 78–62 |
| 2022 | Michigan | Colorado State | 75–63 |
| 2022 | Notre Dame | Alabama | 78–64 |
| 2022 | Iowa State | LSU | 59–54 |
| 2023 | Pittsburgh | Iowa State | 59–41 |
| 2024 | Duquesne | BYU | 71–67 |
| 2024 | NC State | Texas Tech | 80–67 |
| 2024 | Oregon | South Carolina | 87–73 |
| 2025 | Drake | Missouri | 67–57 |
| 2026 | VCU | North Carolina | 82–78^{OT} |
| 2026 | Texas | BYU | 79–71 |

== Round of 32 ==
The Round of 32 is also called the Second Round and, occasionally, the regional quarterfinals. This is the first round in which No. 7 seeds, No. 8 seeds, No. 9 seeds, and No. 10 seeds are able to face teams ranked five seed lines higher than them and is therefore the first round in which these teams may record upset victories.

=== 16 seeds ===
A No. 16 seed has never won a game in the Round of 32. The closest margin of defeat happened in 2018, when UMBC lost to No. 9 seed Kansas State by seven points.

=== 15 seeds ===
Four of the eleven No. 15 seeds (36.36%) who advanced from the Round of 64 also won in the Round of 32. Seeds of the teams they defeated are in parentheses.

| Year | Winner | Loser | Score |
|---|---|---|---|
| 2013 | Florida Gulf Coast | (7) San Diego State | 81–71 |
| 2021 | Oral Roberts | (7) Florida | 81–78 |
| 2022 | Saint Peter's | (7) Murray State | 70–60 |
| 2023 | Princeton | (7) Missouri | 78–63 |

=== 14 seeds ===
Two of the twenty-three No. 14 seeds (8.7%) who advanced from the Round of 64 also won in the Round of 32. Seeds of the teams they defeated are in parentheses.

| Year | Winner | Loser | Score |
|---|---|---|---|
| 1986 | Cleveland State | (6) Saint Joseph's | 75–69 |
| 1997 | Chattanooga | (6) Illinois | 75–63 |

=== 13 seeds ===
Six of the thirty-three No. 13 seeds (18.18%) who advanced from the Round of 64 also won in the Round of 32. Seeds of the teams they defeated are in parentheses.

Second Round upsets
| Year | Winner | Loser | Score |
| 1988 | Richmond | (5) Georgia Tech | 59–55 |
| 1999 | Oklahoma | (5) UNC Charlotte (Note: Known athletically as Charlotte since 2000–01.) | 85–72 |
| 2006 | Bradley | (5) Pittsburgh | 72–66 |

Other Second Round victories
| Year | Winner | Loser | Score |
| 1998 | Valparaiso^{‡} | (12) Florida State | 83–77^{OT} |
| 2012 | Ohio^{‡} | (12) South Florida | 62–56 |
| 2013 | La Salle^{‡} | (12) Ole Miss | 76–74 |

^{‡} Not officially an upset because the teams were separated by fewer than five seed lines.

=== 12 seeds ===
Twenty-two of the fifty-eight No. 12 seeds (37.93%) who advanced from the Round of 64 also won in the Round of 32. Seeds of the teams they defeated are in parentheses.

Second Round upsets
| Year | Winner | Loser | Score |
| 1985 | Kentucky | (4) UNLV | 64–61 |
| 1986 | DePaul | (4) Oklahoma | 74–69 |
| 1987 | Wyoming | (4) UCLA | 78–68 |
| 1990 | Ball State | (4) Louisville | 62–60 |
| 1994 | Tulsa | (4) Oklahoma State | 82–80 |
| 1996 | Arkansas | (4) Marquette | 65–56 |
| 1999 | Southwest Missouri State (Note: Known as Missouri State since 2005–06.) | (4) Tennessee | 81–51 |
| 2002 | Missouri | (4) Ohio State | 83–64 |
| 2003 | Butler | (4) Louisville | 79–71 |
| 2005 | Milwaukee | (4) Boston College | 83–75 |
| 2010 | Cornell | (4) Wisconsin | 87–69 |
| 2013 | Oregon | (4) Saint Louis | 74–57 |
| 2021 | Oregon State | (4) Oklahoma State | 80–70 |

Other Second Round victories
| Year | Winner | Loser | Score |
| 1991 | Eastern Michigan | (13) Penn State | 71–68^{OT} |
| 1992 | New Mexico State | (13) Southwestern Louisiana | 81–73 |
| 1993 | George Washington | (13) Southern | 90–80 |
| 2001 | Gonzaga | (13) Indiana State | 85–68 |
| 2008 | Western Kentucky | (13) San Diego | 72–63 |
| 2008 | Villanova | (13) Siena | 84–72 |
| 2009 | Arizona | (13) Cleveland State | 71–57 |
| 2011 | Richmond | (13) Morehead State | 65–48 |
| 2019 | Oregon | (13) UC Irvine | 73–54 |

=== 11 seeds ===
Twenty-eight of the sixty-four No. 11 seeds (43.75%) who advanced from the Round of 64 also won in the Round of 32. Seeds of the teams they defeated are in parentheses.

Second Round upsets
| Year | Winner | Loser | Score |
| 1985 | Auburn | (3) Kansas | 66–64 |
| 1985 | Boston College | (3) Duke | 74–73 |
| 1986 | LSU | (3) Memphis State | 83–81 |
| 1988 | Rhode Island | (3) Syracuse | 97–94 |
| 1990 | Loyola Marymount | (3) Michigan | 149–115 |
| 2001 | Temple | (3) Florida | 75–54 |
| 2002 | Southern Illinois | (3) Georgia | 77–75 |
| 2006 | George Mason | (3) North Carolina | 65–60 |
| 2010 | Washington | (3) New Mexico | 82–64 |
| 2011 | Marquette | (3) Syracuse | 66–62 |
| 2011 | VCU | (3) Purdue | 94–76 |
| 2012 | NC State | (3) Georgetown | 66–63 |
| 2014 | Dayton | (3) Syracuse | 55–53 |
| 2016 | Gonzaga | (3) Utah | 82–59 |
| 2017 | Xavier | (3) Florida State | 91–66 |
| 2018 | Loyola Chicago | (3) Tennessee | 63–62 |
| 2018 | Syracuse | (3) Michigan State | 55–53 |
| 2021 | Syracuse | (3) West Virginia | 75–72 |
| 2022 | Iowa State | (3) Wisconsin | 54–49 |
| 2022 | Michigan | (3) Tennessee | 76–68 |
| 2026 | Texas | (3) Gonzaga | 74–68 |

Other Second Round victories
| Year | Winner | Loser | Score |
| 1989 | Minnesota | (14) Siena | 80–67 |
| 1991 | Connecticut | (14) Xavier | 66–50 |
| 1998 | Washington | (14) Richmond | 81–66 |
| 2014 | Tennessee | (14) Mercer | 83–63 |
| 2015 | UCLA | (14) UAB | 92–75 |
| 2021 | UCLA | (14) Abilene Christian | 67–47 |
| 2024 | NC State | (14) Oakland | 79–73^{OT} |

=== 10 seeds ===
Twenty-five of the sixty-three No. 10 seeds (39.68%) who advanced from the Round of 64 also won in the Round of 32. Seeds of the teams they defeated are in parentheses.

Second Round upsets
| Year | Winner | Loser | Score |
| 1987 | LSU | (2) Temple | 72–62 |
| 1990 | Texas | (2) Purdue | 73–72 |
| 1994 | Maryland | (2) UMass | 95–87 |
| 1997 | Providence | (2) Duke | 98–87 |
| 1998 | West Virginia | (2) Cincinnati | 75–74 |
| 1999 | Purdue | (2) Miami (FL) | 73–63 |
| 1999 | Miami (OH) | (2) Utah | 66–58 |
| 1999 | Gonzaga | (2) Stanford | 82–74 |
| 2000 | Seton Hall | (2) Temple | 67–65^{OT} |
| 2000 | Gonzaga | (2) St. John's | 82–76 |
| 2002 | Kent State | (2) Alabama | 71–58 |
| 2003 | Auburn | (2) Wake Forest | 68–62 |
| 2004 | Nevada | (2) Gonzaga | 91–72 |
| 2005 | NC State | (2) Connecticut | 65–62 |
| 2008 | Davidson | (2) Georgetown | 74–70 |
| 2010 | St. Mary's | (2) Villanova | 75–68 |
| 2011 | Florida State | (2) Notre Dame | 71–58 |
| 2014 | Stanford | (2) Kansas | 60–57 |
| 2022 | Miami (FL) | (2) Auburn | 79–61 |
| 2025 | Arkansas | (2) St. John's | 75–66 |

Other Second Round victories
| Year | Winner | Loser | Score |
| 1991 | Temple | (15) Richmond | 77–64 |
| 1997 | Texas | (15) Coppin State | 82–81 |
| 2001 | Georgetown | (15) Hampton | 76–57 |
| 2012 | Xavier | (15) Lehigh | 70–58 |
| 2016 | Syracuse | (15) Middle Tennessee | 75–50 |

=== 9 seeds ===
Nine of the eighty-seven No. 9 seeds (10.34%) who advanced from the Round of 64 also won in the Round of 32. Seeds of the teams they defeated are in parentheses.

Second Round upsets
| Year | Winner | Loser | Score |
| 1992 | UTEP | (1) Kansas | 66–60 |
| 1994 | Boston College | (1) North Carolina | 75–72 |
| 2004 | UAB | (1) Kentucky | 76–75 |
| 2010 | Northern Iowa | (1) Kansas | 69–67 |
| 2013 | Wichita State | (1) Gonzaga | 76–70 |
| 2018 | Florida State | (1) Xavier | 75–70 |
| 2026 | Iowa | (1) Florida | 73–72 |

Other Second Round victories
| Year | Winner | Loser | Score |
| 2018 | Kansas State | (16) UMBC | 50–43 |
| 2023 | Florida Atlantic | (16) Fairleigh Dickinson | 78–70 |

=== 8 seeds ===
Sixteen of the seventy-seven No. 8 seeds (20.78%) who advanced from the Round of 64 also won in the Round of 32. Seeds of the teams they defeated are in parentheses.

| Year | Winner | Loser | Score |
|---|---|---|---|
| 1985 | Villanova | (1) Michigan | 59–55 |
| 1986 | Auburn | (1) St. John's | 81–65 |
| 1990 | North Carolina | (1) Oklahoma | 79–77 |
| 1996 | Georgia | (1) Purdue | 76–69 |
| 1998 | Rhode Island | (1) Kansas | 80–75 |
| 2000 | North Carolina | (1) Stanford | 60–53 |
| 2000 | Wisconsin | (1) Arizona | 66–59 |
| 2002 | UCLA | (1) Cincinnati | 105–101^{2OT} |
| 2004 | Alabama | (1) Stanford | 70–67 |
| 2011 | Butler | (1) Pittsburgh | 71–70 |
| 2014 | Kentucky | (1) Wichita State | 78–76 |
| 2015 | NC State | (1) Villanova | 71–68 |
| 2017 | Wisconsin | (1) Villanova | 65–62 |
| 2021 | Loyola Chicago | (1) Illinois | 71–58 |
| 2022 | North Carolina | (1) Baylor | 93–86^{OT} |
| 2023 | Arkansas | (1) Kansas | 72–71 |

=== 7 seeds ===
Twenty-nine of the one hundred and one No. 7 seeds (28.71%) who advanced from the Round of 64 also won in the Round of 32. Seeds of the teams they defeated are in parentheses.

Second Round upsets
| Year | Winner | Loser | Score |
| 1985 | Alabama | (2) VCU | 63–59 |
| 1986 | Navy | (2) Syracuse | 97–85 |
| 1986 | Iowa State | (2) Michigan | 72–69 |
| 1988 | Vanderbilt | (2) Pittsburgh | 80–74 |
| 1990 | UCLA | (2) Kansas | 71–70 |
| 1990 | Alabama | (2) Arizona | 77–55 |
| 1992 | Georgia Tech | (2) USC | 79–78 |
| 1993 | Western Kentucky | (2) Seton Hall | 72–68 |
| 2000 | Tulsa | (2) Cincinnati | 69–61 |
| 2001 | Penn State | (2) North Carolina | 82–74 |
| 2003 | Michigan State | (2) Florida | 68–46 |
| 2004 | Xavier | (2) Mississippi State | 89–74 |
| 2005 | West Virginia | (2) Wake Forest | 111–105^{2OT} |
| 2006 | Georgetown | (2) Ohio State | 70–52 |
| 2006 | Wichita State | (2) Tennessee | 80–73 |
| 2007 | UNLV | (2) Wisconsin | 74–68 |
| 2008 | West Virginia | (2) Duke | 73–67 |
| 2014 | UConn | (2) Villanova | 77–65 |
| 2015 | Wichita State | (2) Kansas | 78–65 |
| 2015 | Michigan State | (2) Virginia | 60–54 |
| 2016 | Wisconsin | (2) Xavier | 66–63 |
| 2017 | South Carolina | (2) Duke | 88–81 |
| 2017 | Michigan | (2) Louisville | 73–69 |
| 2018 | Nevada | (2) Cincinnati | 75–73 |
| 2018 | Texas A&M | (2) North Carolina | 86–65 |
| 2021 | Oregon | (2) Iowa | 95–80 |
| 2023 | Michigan State | (2) Marquette | 69–60 |

Other Second Round victories
| Year | Winner | Loser | Score |
| 1993 | Temple | (15) Santa Clara | 68–57 |
| 2012 | Florida | (15) Norfolk State | 84–50 |

== Sweet Sixteen ==
The Sweet Sixteen are the eight pairs of teams that meet in the regional semifinals.

=== 15 seeds ===
One of the four No. 15 seeds (25%) who advanced from the Round of 32 also won in the Sweet Sixteen. The seed of the team they defeated is in parentheses.

| Year | Winner | Loser | Score |
|---|---|---|---|
| 2022 | Saint Peter's | (3) Purdue | 67–64 |

=== 14 seeds ===
A No. 14 seed has never won a game in the Sweet Sixteen. The closest margin of defeat happened in 1986, when Cleveland State lost to No. 7 seed Navy by one point.

=== 13 seeds ===
A No. 13 seed has never won a game in the Sweet Sixteen. The closest margin of defeat happened in 1998, when Valparaiso lost to No. 8 seed Rhode Island by six points.

=== 12 seeds ===
Two of the twenty-two No. 12 seeds (9.09%) who advanced from the Round of 32 also won in the Sweet Sixteen. Seeds of the teams they defeated are in parentheses.

| Year | Winner | Loser | Score |
|---|---|---|---|
| 2002 | Missouri^{‡} | (8) UCLA | 82–73 |
| 2021 | Oregon State^{‡} | (8) Loyola Chicago | 65–58 |

^{‡} Not officially an upset because the teams were separated by fewer than five seed lines.

=== 11 seeds ===
Ten of the twenty-eight No. 11 seeds (35.71%) who advanced from the Round of 32 also won in the Sweet Sixteen. Seeds of the teams they defeated are in parentheses.

Sweet Sixteen upsets
| Year | Winner | Loser | Score |
| 1986 | LSU | (2) Georgia Tech | 70–64 |
| 2017 | Xavier | (2) Arizona | 73–71 |
| 2021 | UCLA | (2) Alabama | 88–78^{OT} |
| 2024 | NC State | (2) Marquette | 67–58 |

Other Sweet Sixteen victories
| Year | Winner | Loser | Score |
| 1990 | Loyola Marymount^{‡} | (7) Alabama | 62–60 |
| 2001 | Temple^{‡} | (7) Penn State | 84–72 |
| 2006 | George Mason^{‡} | (7) Wichita State | 63–55 |
| 2011 | VCU^{‡} | (10) Florida State | 72–71^{OT} |
| 2014 | Dayton^{‡} | (10) Stanford | 82–72 |
| 2018 | Loyola Chicago^{‡} | (7) Nevada | 69–68 |

^{‡} Not officially an upset because the teams were separated by fewer than five seed lines.

=== 10 seeds ===
Nine of the twenty-five No. 10 seeds (36%) who advanced from the Round of 32 also won in the Sweet Sixteen. Seeds of the teams they defeated are in parentheses.

Sweet Sixteen upsets
| Year | Winner | Loser | Score |
| 1987 | LSU | (3) DePaul | 63–58 |
| 1991 | Temple | (3) Oklahoma State | 72–63 |
| 2002 | Kent State | (3) Pittsburgh | 78–73 |
| 2008 | Davidson | (3) Wisconsin | 73–56 |

Other Sweet Sixteen victories
| Year | Winner | Loser | Score |
| 1990 | Texas^{‡} | (6) Xavier | 102–89 |
| 1997 | Providence^{†} | (14) Chattanooga | 71–65 |
| 1999 | Gonzaga^{‡} | (6) Florida | 73–72 |
| 2016 | Syracuse^{†} | (11) Gonzaga | 63–60 |
| 2022 | Miami (FL)^{†} | (11) Iowa State | 70–56 |

^{†} Not an upset, as the No. 10 seed defeated a lower seed.
^{‡} Not officially an upset because the teams were separated by fewer than five seed lines.

=== 9 seeds ===
Six of the nine No. 9 seeds (66.67%) who advanced from the Round of 32 also won in the Sweet Sixteen. Seeds of the teams they defeated are in parentheses.

Sweet Sixteen upsets
| Year | Winner | Loser | Score |
| 2018 | Florida State | (4) Gonzaga | 75–60 |
| 2023 | Florida Atlantic | (4) Tennessee | 62–55 |
| 2026 | Iowa | (4) Nebraska | 77–71 |

Other Sweet Sixteen victories
| Year | Winner | Loser | Score |
| 1994 | Boston College^{‡} | (5) Indiana | 77–68 |
| 2013 | Wichita State^{†} | (13) La Salle | 72–58 |
| 2018 | Kansas State^{‡} | (5) Kentucky | 61–58 |

^{†} Not an upset, as the No. 9 seed defeated a lower seed.
^{‡} Not officially an upset because the teams were separated by fewer than five seed lines.

=== 8 seeds ===
Nine of the sixteen No. 8 seeds (56.25%) who advanced from the Round of 32 also won in the Sweet Sixteen. Seeds of the teams they defeated are in parentheses.

| Year | Winner | Loser | Score |
|---|---|---|---|
| 1985 | Villanova^{‡} | (5) Maryland | 46–43 |
| 1986 | Auburn^{‡} | (4) UNLV | 70–63 |
| 1998 | Rhode Island^{†} | (13) Valparaiso | 74–68 |
| 2000 | North Carolina^{‡} | (4) Tennessee | 74–69 |
| 2000 | Wisconsin^{‡} | (4) LSU | 61–48 |
| 2004 | Alabama^{‡} | (5) Syracuse | 80–71 |
| 2011 | Butler^{‡} | (4) Wisconsin | 61–54 |
| 2014 | Kentucky^{‡} | (4) Louisville | 74–69 |
| 2022 | North Carolina^{‡} | (4) UCLA | 73–66 |

^{†} Not an upset, as the No. 8 seed defeated a lower seed.
^{‡} Not officially an upset because the teams were separated by fewer than five seed lines.

=== 7 seeds ===
Ten of the twenty-nine No. 7 seeds (34.48%) who advanced from the Round of 32 also won in the Sweet Sixteen. Seeds of the teams they defeated are in parentheses.

| Year | Winner | Loser | Score |
|---|---|---|---|
| 1986 | Navy^{†} | (14) Cleveland State | 71–70 |
| 1993 | Temple^{‡} | (3) Vanderbilt | 67–59 |
| 2000 | Tulsa^{‡} | (6) Miami (FL) | 80–71 |
| 2003 | Michigan State^{‡} | (6) Maryland | 60–58 |
| 2004 | Xavier^{‡} | (3) Texas | 79–71 |
| 2005 | West Virginia^{‡} | (6) Texas Tech | 65–60 |
| 2012 | Florida^{‡} | (3) Marquette | 68–58 |
| 2014 | UConn^{‡} | (3) Iowa State | 81–76 |
| 2015 | Michigan State^{‡} | (3) Oklahoma | 62–58 |
| 2017 | South Carolina^{‡} | (3) Baylor | 70–50 |

^{†} Not an upset, as the No. 7 seed defeated a lower seed.
^{‡} Not officially an upset because the teams were separated by fewer than five seed lines.

== Elite Eight ==
The Elite Eight are the four pairs of teams that meet in the regional finals. This is the first round in which No. 6 seeds are able to face teams ranked five seed lines higher than them and is therefore the first round in which No. 6 seeds may record upset victories.

=== 15 seeds ===
A No. 15 seed has never won a game in the Elite Eight. The closest margin of defeat happened in 2022, when Saint Peter's lost to No. 8 seed North Carolina by 20 points.

=== 12 seeds ===
A No. 12 seed has never won a game in the Elite Eight. The closest margins of defeat happened in 2002, when Missouri lost to No. 2 seed Oklahoma, and 2021, when Oregon State lost to No. 2 seed Houston, both by six points.

=== 11 seeds ===
Six of the ten No. 11 seeds (60%) who advanced from the Sweet Sixteen also won in the Elite Eight. Seeds of the teams they defeated are in parentheses.

Elite Eight upsets
| Year | Winner | Loser | Score |
| 1986 | LSU | (1) Kentucky | 59–57 |
| 2006 | George Mason | (1) Connecticut | 86–84^{OT} |
| 2011 | VCU | (1) Kansas | 71–61 |
| 2021 | UCLA | (1) Michigan | 51–49 |
| 2024 | NC State | (4) Duke | 76–64 |

Other Elite Eight victories
| Year | Winner | Loser | Score |
| 2018 | Loyola Chicago^{‡} | (9) Kansas State | 78–62 |

^{‡} Not officially an upset because the teams were separated by fewer than five seed lines.

=== 10 seeds ===
One of the nine No. 10 seeds (11.11%) who advanced from the Sweet Sixteen also won in the Elite Eight. The seed of the team they defeated is in parentheses.

| Year | Winner | Loser | Score |
|---|---|---|---|
| 2016 | Syracuse | (1) Virginia | 68–62 |

=== 9 seeds ===
Two of the six No. 9 seeds (33.33%) who advanced from the Sweet Sixteen also won in the Elite Eight. Seeds of the teams they defeated are in parentheses.

| Year | Winner | Loser | Score |
|---|---|---|---|
| 2013 | Wichita State | (2) Ohio State | 70–66 |
| 2023 | Florida Atlantic | (3) Kansas State | 79–76 |

=== 8 seeds ===
Six of the nine No. 8 seeds (66.67%) who advanced from the Sweet Sixteen also won in the Elite Eight. Seeds of the teams they defeated are in parentheses.

Elite Eight upsets
| Year | Winner | Loser | Score |
| 1985 | Villanova | (2) North Carolina | 56–44 |
| 2011 | Butler | (2) Florida | 74–71^{OT} |
| 2014 | Kentucky | (2) Michigan | 75–72 |

Other Elite Eight victories
| Year | Winner | Loser | Score |
| 2000 | Wisconsin^{‡} | (6) Purdue | 64–60 |
| 2000 | North Carolina^{‡} | (7) Tulsa | 59–55 |
| 2022 | North Carolina^{†} | (15) Saint Peter's | 69–49 |

^{†} Not an upset, as the No. 8 seed defeated a lower seed.
^{‡} Not officially an upset because the teams were separated by fewer than five seed lines.

=== 7 seeds ===
Three of the ten No. 7 seeds (30%) who advanced from the Sweet Sixteen also won in the Elite Eight. Seeds of the teams they defeated are in parentheses.

| Year | Winner | Loser | Score |
|---|---|---|---|
| 2014 | UConn^{‡} | (4) Michigan State | 60–54 |
| 2015 | Michigan State^{‡} | (4) Louisville | 76–70 |
| 2017 | South Carolina^{‡} | (4) Florida | 77–70 |

^{‡} Not officially an upset because the teams were separated by fewer than five seed lines.

=== 6 seeds ===
Three of the eighteen No. 6 seeds (16.67%) who advanced from the Sweet Sixteen also won in the Elite Eight. Seeds of the teams they defeated are in parentheses.

Elite Eight upsets
| Year | Winner | Loser | Score |
| 1987 | Providence | (1) Georgetown | 88–73 |
| 1992 | Michigan | (1) Ohio State | 75–71^{OT} |

Other Elite Eight victories
| Year | Winner | Loser | Score |
| 1988 | Kansas^{‡} | (4) Kansas State | 71–58 |

^{‡} Not officially an upset because the teams were separated by fewer than five seed lines.

== Final Four ==
The Final Four are the winners of the four regional finals.

=== 9 seeds or lower ===
No team seeded No. 9 or lower has ever won a game in the Final Four. The closest margin of defeat happened in 2023, when No. 9 seed Florida Atlantic lost to No. 5 seed San Diego State by one point.

=== 8 seeds ===
Four of the six No. 8 seeds (66.67%) who advanced from the Elite Eight also won in the Final Four. Seeds of the teams they defeated are in parentheses.

Final Four upsets
| Year | Winner | Loser | Score |
| 1985 | Villanova | (2) Memphis State | 52–45 |
| 2014 | Kentucky | (2) Wisconsin | 74–73 |
| 2022 | North Carolina | (2) Duke | 81–77 |

Other Final Four victories
| Year | Winner | Loser | Score |
| 2011 | Butler^{†} | (11) VCU | 70–62 |

^{†} Not an upset, as the No. 8 seed defeated a lower seed.

=== 7 seeds ===
One of the three No. 7 seeds (33.33%) who advanced from the Elite Eight also won in the Final Four. The seed of the team they defeated is in parentheses.

| Year | Winner | Loser | Score |
|---|---|---|---|
| 2014 | UConn | (1) Florida | 63–53 |

=== 6 seeds ===
Two of the three No. 6 seeds (66.67%) who advanced from the Elite Eight also won in the Final Four. Seeds of the teams they defeated are in parentheses.

| Year | Winner | Loser | Score |
|---|---|---|---|
| 1988 | Kansas^{‡} | (2) Duke | 66–59 |
| 1992 | Michigan^{‡} | (4) Cincinnati | 76–72 |

^{‡} Not officially an upset because the teams were separated by fewer than five seed lines.

== National championship ==
=== 8 seeds ===
One of the four No. 8 seeds (25%) who advanced from the Final Four also won the national championship. The seed of the team they defeated is in parentheses.

| Year | Winner | Loser | Score |
|---|---|---|---|
| 1985 | Villanova | (1) Georgetown | 66–64 |

=== 7 seeds ===
The only No. 7 seed who advanced from the Final Four also won the national championship. The seed of the team they defeated is in parentheses.

| Year | Winner | Loser | Score |
|---|---|---|---|
| 2014 | UConn^{†} | (8) Kentucky | 60–54 |

^{†} Not an upset, as the No. 7 seed defeated a lower seed.

=== 6 seeds ===
One of the two No. 6 seeds (50%) who advanced from the Final Four also won the national championship. The seed of the team they defeated is in parentheses.

| Year | Winner | Loser | Score |
|---|---|---|---|
| 1988 | Kansas | (1) Oklahoma | 83–79 |

== See also ==
- NCAA Division I women's basketball tournament upsets
