= 1986 TAAC men's basketball tournament =

- Classification: Division I
- Season: 1985–86
- Teams: 8
- Site: Barton Coliseum; Little Rock, AR
- Champions: Arkansas–Little Rock (1st title)
- Winning coach: Mike Newell (1st title)
- MVP: Michael Clarke (Arkansas–Little Rock)
- TAAC men's basketball tournaments

1985–86 Trans America Athletic Conference men's basketball standings
	Conf.				Overall
Team	W		L	PCT	W		L	PCT
Arkansas–Little Rock †	12	–	2	.857	23	–	11	.676
Samford	8	–	6	.571	16	–	13	.552
Houston Baptist	7	–	7	.500	14	–	14	.500
Hardin–Simmons	7	–	7	.500	15	–	13	.536
Mercer	6	–	8	.429	15	–	14	.517
Centenary	6	–	8	.429	13	–	17	.433
Georgia Southern	6	–	8	.429	15	–	13	.536
Georgia State	4	–	10	.286	10	–	18	.357
Stetson	-	–	-	–	10	–	18	.357
† 1986 TAAC tournament winner Rankings from AP Poll

The 1986 Trans America Athletic Conference men's basketball tournament (now known as the ASUN men's basketball tournament) was held March 1–3 at Barton Coliseum in Little Rock, Arkansas.

Arkansas–Little Rock defeated Centenary (LA) in the championship game, 85–63, to win their first TAAC/Atlantic Sun men's basketball tournament. The Trojans, therefore, received an automatic bid to the 1986 NCAA tournament, their first Division I tournament appearance.

Stetson joined the TAAC for the 1985–86 season but did not participate in the conference tournament.

== Bracket ==
Quarterfinals; Saturday, March 1
1	Arkansas–Little Rock	115
8	Georgia State	82
5	Mercer	70
4	Hardin–Simmons	61
3	Houston Baptist	81
6	Centenary (LA)	84
7	Georgia Southern	59
2	Samford	73

Semifinals; Sunday, March 2
1	Arkansas–Little Rock	81
5	Mercer	66
6	Centenary (LA)	96
2	Samford	82

Championship; Monday, March 3
1	Arkansas–Little Rock	85
6	Centenary (LA)	63
