= NCAA Division I women's basketball tournament upsets =

List of Women's D1 NCAA tournament upsets

An upset is a victory by an underdog team. In the context of the NCAA Division I women's basketball tournament, a single-elimination tournament, this generally constitutes a lower seeded team defeating a higher-seeded (i.e., higher-ranked) team; a widely recognized upset is one performed by a team ranked substantially lower than its opponent.

This is the list of victories by teams seeded 11 or lower in the first round and second rounds of the tournament, as well as those by teams seeded 8 or 9 against 1 and 7 or 10 against 2 seeds in the second round, since it expanded to 64 teams in 1994; as these low-seeded teams were automatically paired against higher-seeded teams at the start of the tournament, their opening victories are almost always considered upsets. Most victories by these teams in later rounds were usually against better seeded opponents as well. The list also includes victories by teams seeded 8 or lower in the Sweet 16 (the four regional semifinals), teams seeded 7 or lower in the Elite Eight (the four regional finals), and teams seeded 6 or lower in the Final Four. All teams are listed by athletic brand names they used at the time of their wins, which do not always match those in use today.

The NCAA defines a tournament "upset" as a victory by a team seeded 5 or more lines below its defeated opponent.

The first 16 seed ever to win a game in an NCAA Division I basketball tournament was Harvard in 1998 against Stanford. According to an Associated Press retrospective on the 10th anniversary of the game in 2008, "The difference between the teams was much smaller than usual for a No. 1 and a 16 seed." Harvard had two years of tournament experience and the nation's leading scorer that season in Allison Feaster. Stanford suffered two devastating injuries during the run-up to the tournament. First, Vanessa Nygaard tore an ACL in the Cardinal's final regular-season game against Oregon State. Because the extent of her injury was not known at the time the tournament field was selected, the Cardinal still received a 1 seed. Then, in the team's first practice after the tournament selection, leading scorer and rebounder Kristin Folkl also tore an ACL.

== Most successful low seeds ==
Best outcomes for low seeds since expansion to 64 teams in 1994:

Seed	2nd Round	Sweet Sixteen	Elite Eight	Final Four	Championship Game	National Champion
No. 16	Harvard (1998)	–	–	–	–	–
No. 15	–	–	–	–	–	–
No. 14	–	–	–	–	–	–
No. 13	Rice (2000); Middle Tennessee (2004); Marist (2012); Wright State (2021)	Texas A&M (1994); Liberty (2005); Marist (2007)	–	–	–	–
No. 12	numerous (22 teams)	San Francisco (1996); Kansas (2013); BYU (2014); Quinnipiac (2017)	–	–	–	–
No. 11	numerous (26 teams)	numerous (10 teams)	Gonzaga (2011)	–	–	–
No. 10	—N/a	Missouri (2001); Florida State (2007); South Dakota (2022); Virginia (2026)	Oregon (2017); Creighton (2022)	–	–	–
No. 9	—N/a	Notre Dame (1998); Michigan State (2009)	Miami (FL) (2023)	Arkansas (1998)	–	–
No. 8	—N/a	Boston College (2006); Ole Miss (2023)	–	–	–	–
No. 7	—N/a	numerous (10 teams)	Old Dominion (2002); Ole Miss (2007); Dayton (2015); Tennessee (2016)	Minnesota (2004); Washington (2016)	–	–
No. 6	—N/a	—N/a	—N/a	Alabama (1994); Notre Dame (1997)	–	–

=== Best Performances by #16 Seeds ===
Other than Harvard beating Stanford in 1998, no losing #16 seed has even lost by single digits and/or taken a game to overtime, with the closest margin of defeat being a 12-point loss by #16 Grambling to #1 Texas Tech in the same tournament.

=== Best Performances by #14 & #15 Seeds ===
No #14 seed has beaten a #3 and no #15 seed has beaten a #2 seed, but they have come close.

- 2 points: #14 Seed
  - Austin Peay lost to UNC in 2003 (2 points, 72–70)
  - Eastern Michigan lost to Boston College in 2004 (2 points, 58–56)
  - Creighton lost to St. John's in 2012 (2 points, 69–67)
- Overtime games: #15 Seed
  - UTSA lost to Baylor in 2009 (5 points, 87–82). UTSA is the only #15 seed to take a game into overtime.
- 1 point: #15 Seed
  - Long Beach State lost to Oregon State in 2017 (1 point, 56–55)

== Round of 64 ==
Detail between each pair of seeds in this section has been updated as of completion of the 2026 Round of 64, representing 128 games played between each pair.

=== 16 defeats 1 ===
There has been 1 game where a 16-seed has defeated a 1-seed (0.78%), in the round of 64, since 1994:

Year	Winner	Loser	Score
1998	Harvard	Stanford	71–67

=== 15 defeats 2 ===
No 15-seed has ever won a game in the women's tournament.

The closest margin of defeat by any 15 seed to a 2 seed came in 2017, when Long Beach State lost 56–55 to 2 seed Oregon State.

=== 14 defeats 3 ===
No 14-seed has ever won a game in the women's tournament.

The closest margin of defeat by any 14 seed to a 3 seed has been two points, three times: in 2003 (North Carolina 72–70 over Austin Peay), 2004 (Boston College 58–56 over Eastern Michigan), and 2012 (St. John's 58–56 over Creighton).

=== 13 defeats 4 ===
There have been 7 games where a 13-seed has defeated a 4-seed (5.47%), in the round of 64, since 1994:

Year	Winner	Loser	Score
1994	Texas A&M	Florida	78–76
2000	Rice	UC Santa Barbara	67–64
2004	Middle Tennessee	North Carolina	67–62
2005	Liberty	Penn State	78–70
2007	Marist	Ohio State	67–63
2012	Marist	Georgia	76–70
2021	Wright State	Arkansas	66–62

=== 12 defeats 5 ===
There have been 26 games where a 12-seed has defeated a 5-seed (20.31%), in the round of 64, since 1994:

Year	Winner	Loser	Score
1994	Western Kentucky	Rutgers	84–73
1995	Montana	San Diego State	57–46
1996	Notre Dame	Purdue	73–60
1996	San Francisco	Florida	68–61
1997	Marquette	Clemson	70–66
1998	Colorado State	Drake	81–75
1998	Youngstown State	Memphis	91–80
2000	SMU	NC State	64–63
2002	Mississippi State	Boston College	65–59
2002	UC Santa Barbara	Louisiana Tech	57–56
2004	Maryland	Miami (FL)	86–85
2005	Middle Tennessee	NC State	60–58
2006	Tulsa	NC State	71–61
2009	Ball State	Tennessee	71–55
2009	Gonzaga	Xavier	75–59
2010	Green Bay	Virginia	69–67
2013	Kansas	Colorado	67–52
2014	BYU	NC State	72–57
2016	South Dakota State	Miami (FL)	74–71
2016	Albany	Florida	61–59
2017	Quinnipiac	Marquette	68–65
2018	Florida Gulf Coast	Missouri	80–70
2021	Belmont	Gonzaga	64–59
2022	Belmont	Oregon	73–70^{2 OT}
2022	Florida Gulf Coast	Virginia Tech	84–81
2023	Florida Gulf Coast	Washington State	74–63
2023	Toledo	Iowa State	80–73

=== 11 defeats 6 ===
There have been 37 games where an 11-seed has defeated a 6-seed (28.91%), in the round of 64, since 1994:

Year	Winner	Loser	Score
1995	Louisville	Oregon	67–65
1996	Stephen F. Austin	Oregon State	67–65
1998	UC Santa Barbara	Vanderbilt	76–71^{OT}
1998	Virginia Tech	Wisconsin	75–64
1999	Saint Joseph's	Duke	83–72
1999	SMU	Toledo	91–76
2000	Stephen F. Austin	Xavier	73–72
2000	UAB	Oregon	80–79^{OT}
2001	TCU	Penn State	77–75
2002	BYU	Florida	90–52
2003	Notre Dame	Arizona	59–47
2004	UC Santa Barbara	Colorado	76–49
2006	Hartford	Temple	64–58
2006	New Mexico	Florida	83–59
2006	TCU	Texas A&M	69–65
2007	West Virginia	Xavier	65–52
2008	Florida State	Ohio State	60–49
2009	Mississippi State	Texas	71–63
2010	Arkansas–Little Rock	Georgia Tech	63–53
2010	San Diego State	Texas	74–63
2011	Gonzaga	Iowa	92–86
2012	Gonzaga	Rutgers	86–73
2012	Kansas	Nebraska	57–49
2014	Florida	Dayton	83–69
2014	James Madison	Gonzaga	72–63
2015	Gonzaga	George Washington	82–69
2015	Miami (FL)	Washington	86–80
2015	Arkansas-Little Rock	Texas A&M	69–60
2018	Central Michigan	LSU	78–69
2018	Buffalo	South Florida	102–79
2018	Creighton	Iowa	76–70
2019	Missouri State	DePaul	89–78
2021	BYU	Rutgers	69–66
2022	Princeton	Kentucky	69–62
2022	Villanova	BYU	61–57
2023	Mississippi State	Creighton	79–64
2024	Middle Tennessee	Louisville	71–69

== Round of 32 ==
This round is called the second round. Occasionally, it is referred to as the regional quarterfinals.

This shows all Round of 32 upset victories by teams seeded 11 or lower, continuing their upset victories from the round of 64. This section introduces additional "meeting criteria of team seeded 5 or more lines below its defeated opponent", being all Round of 32 upset victories by teams seeded 8 or 9 against 1 seeds and by teams seeded 7 or 10 against 2 seeds.

=== 16th seed victories ===
No 16 seed has ever won a second-round game. Harvard, the only 16 seed to advance to the second round, lost to 9 seed Arkansas 82–64 in the second round.

=== 13th seed victories ===
Three of the seven 13 seeds (42.86%) who advanced from the round of 64 also achieved a victory in the round of 32. Seeds of the teams they defeated are in parentheses.

All of the 13 seeds who advanced from the round of 64 faced a 5 seed.

Year	Winner	Loser	Score
1994	Texas A&M	(5) San Diego State	75–72^{OT}
2005	Liberty	(5) DePaul	88–79
2007	Marist	(5) Middle Tennessee	73–59

=== 12th seed victories ===
Four of the twenty-six 12 seeds (15.38%) who advanced from the round of 64 also achieved a victory in the round of 32. Seeds of the teams they defeated are in parentheses.

All of the 12 seeds who advanced from the round of 64 faced a 4 seed.

Year	Winner	Loser	Score
1996	San Francisco	(4) Duke	64–60
2013	Kansas	(4) South Carolina	75–69
2014	BYU	(4) Nebraska	80–76
2017	Quinnipiac	(4) Miami (FL)	85–78

=== 11th seed victories ===
Eleven of the thirty-seven 11 seeds (29.73%) who advanced from the round of 64 also achieved a victory in the round of 32. Seeds of the teams they defeated are in parentheses.

All of the 11 seeds who advanced from the round of 64 faced a 3 seed.

Year	Winner	Loser	Score
1996	Stephen F. Austin	(3) Clemson	93–88^{OT}
2000	UAB	(3) Mississippi State	78–72
2002	BYU	(3) Iowa State	75–69
2003	Notre Dame	(3) Kansas State	59–53
2004	UC Santa Barbara	(3) Houston	56–52
2010	San Diego State	(3) West Virginia	64–55
2011	Gonzaga	(3) UCLA	89–75
2012	Gonzaga	(3) Miami (FL)	65–54
2012	Kansas	(3) Delaware	70–64
2015	Gonzaga	(3) Oregon State	76–65
2018	Central Michigan	(3) Ohio State	95–78
2018	Buffalo	(3) Florida State	86–65
2019	Missouri State	(3) Iowa State	69–60

=== 10th seed victories ===
Five of the forty-one 10 seeds (12.2%) who advanced from the round of 64 also achieved a victory in the round of 32. Seeds of the teams they defeated are in parentheses.

All of the 10 seeds who advanced from the round of 64 faced a 2 seed.

Year	Winner	Loser	Score
2001	Missouri	(2) Georgia	78-65
2007	Florida State	(2) Stanford	68-81
2017	Oregon	(2) Duke	74-65
2022	South Dakota	(2) Baylor	61-47
2022	Creighton	(2) Iowa	64-62
2026	Virginia	(2) Iowa	83-75^{2OT}

=== 9th seed victories ===
Four of the fifty-nine 9 seeds (6.78%) who advanced from the round of 64 also won in the round of 32. Seeds of the teams they defeated are in parentheses.

One of these victories was against a lower seeded team that had also advanced from the round of 64 due to upset; thus, this second-round victory does not count as an upset, and has been shown here in a table separate from the three upset wins by 9 seeds in the second round. Three of the fifty-eight 9 seeds who have faced a 1 seed advanced to the Sweet Sixteen (5.17%).

Defeated a lower seed
Year	Winner	Loser	Score
1998	Arkansas	(16) Harvard	82-64

Second Round upsets
Year	Winner	Loser	Score
1998	Notre Dame	(1) Texas Tech	74-59
2009	Michigan State	(1) Duke	63-49
2023	Miami (FL)	(1) Indiana	70-68

=== 8th seed victories ===
Two of the sixty-one 8 seeds (3.28%) who advanced from the round of 64 also achieved a victory in the round of 32. Seeds of the teams they defeated are in parentheses. Neither of these teams would win in the Sweet Sixteen, with Boston College losing to 5 seed Utah by three points in 2006 after missing three game tying shots in the last 20 seconds and Ole Miss losing by ten points to 5 seed Louisville in 2023.

Both of the 8 seeds who advanced from the round of 64 faced a 1 seed.

Year	Winner	Loser	Score
2006	Boston College	(1) Ohio State	68-45
2023	Ole Miss	(1) Stanford	54-49

=== 7th seed victories ===
Sixteen of the seventy-nine 7 seeds (20.25%) who advanced from the round of 64 also achieved a victory in the round of 32. Seeds of the teams they defeated are in parentheses.

All of the 7 seeds who advanced from the round of 64 faced a 2 seed.

Year	Winner	Loser	Score
1995	NC State	(2) Penn State	76-74
2002	Drake	(2) Baylor	76-72
2002	Old Dominion	(2) Purdue	74-70^{OT}
2004	Minnesota	(2) Kansas State	80-61
2007	Bowling Green	(2) Vanderbilt	59-56
2007	Ole Miss	(2) Maryland	89-78
2009	Rutgers	(2) Auburn	80-52
2010	Gonzaga	(2) Texas A&M	72-71
2010	Mississippi State	(2) Ohio State	85-67
2011	Louisville	(2) Xavier	85-75
2014	LSU	(2) West Virginia	76-67
2014	DePaul	(2) Duke	74-65
2015	Dayton	(2) Kentucky	99-94
2016	Washington	(2) Maryland	74-65
2016	Tennessee	(2) Arizona State	75-64
2024	Duke	(2) Ohio State	75-63

== Sweet Sixteen ==
The Sweet Sixteen are the eight pairs of teams that meet in the Regional semifinals.

=== 13 seeds ===
Although three 13 seeds made it to the Sweet Sixteen, none of them won their games in this round. The closest margin of defeat happened in 2007, when Marist lost to 1 seed Tennessee by 19 points.

=== 12 seeds ===
Although four 12 seeds made it to the Sweet Sixteen, none of them won their games in this round. The closest margin of defeat happened in 2014, when BYU lost to 1 seed UConn by 19 points.

=== 11 seeds ===
One of the eleven 11 seeds (9.09%) who advanced from the round of 32 also achieved a victory in the Sweet Sixteen. Seed of the team they defeated is in parentheses, showing that this was not an upset victory (separated by more than 4 seed lines).

Year	Winner	Loser	Score
2011	Gonzaga^{‡}	(7) Louisville	76–69

^{‡} Not officially an upset because the teams were separated by fewer than 5 seed lines.

=== 10 seeds ===
Two of the five 10 seeds (40%) who advanced from the round of 32 also achieved a victory in the Sweet Sixteen. Seeds of the teams they defeated are in parentheses, showing that both of these were upset victories (separated by more than 4 seed lines).

Year	Winner	Loser	Score
2017	Oregon	(3) Maryland	77-63
2022	Creighton	(3) Iowa State	76-68

=== 9 seeds ===
Two of the four 9 seeds (40%) who advanced from the round of 32 also achieved a victory in the Sweet Sixteen. Seeds of the teams they defeated are in parentheses, showing that one of these was an upset victory (separated by more than 4 seed lines).

Year	Winner	Loser	Score
1998	Arkansas^{‡}	(5) Kansas	79-63
2023	Miami (FL)	(4) Villanova	70-65

^{‡} Not officially an upset because the teams were separated by fewer than 5 seed lines.

== Elite Eight ==
The Elite Eight are the four pairs of teams that meet in the Regional Finals.

=== 11 seeds ===
The only 11 seed who advanced from the Sweet Sixteen, Gonzaga in 2011, was defeated in the Elite Eight by one-seed Stanford, 83-60.

=== 10 seeds ===
Although two 10 seeds have advanced from the Sweet Sixteen, both were defeated in the Elite Eight: Oregon to top-seeded UConn, 90-52 in 2017, and Creighton to top-seeded South Carolina, 80-50 in 2022.

=== 9 seeds ===
One of the two 9 seeds who advanced from the Sweet Sixteen also won in the Elite Eight. Seed of the team they defeated is in parentheses, showing that this was an upset victory (separated by more than 4 seed lines). The team did not win in the Final Four.

Year	Winner	Loser	Score
1998	Arkansas	(2) Duke	77-72

=== 7 seeds ===
Two of the six 7 seeds who advanced from the Sweet Sixteen also won in the Elite Eight. Seeds of the teams they defeated are in parentheses, showing that one of these was an upset victory (separated by more than 4 seed lines). Neither team won in the Final Four.

Year	Winner	Loser	Score
2004	Minnesota	(1) Duke	82-75
2016	Washington^{‡}	(4) Stanford	85-76

^{‡} Not officially an upset because the teams were separated by fewer than 5 seed lines.

=== 6 seeds ===
Two 6 seeds have advanced to the Final Four. Seeds of the teams they defeated are in parentheses, showing that one of these was an upset victory (separated by more than 4 seed lines). Neither team won in the Final Four.

Year	Winner	Loser	Score
1994	Alabama	(1) Penn State	96–82
1997	Notre Dame^{‡}	(5) George Washington	62–52

^{‡} Not officially an upset because the teams were separated by fewer than 5 seed lines.

== Final Four ==
The Final Four are the winners of the four Regional Finals.

To date, no team has ever completed an official upset in the Final Four. The most seed lines apart a winning lower seed has been is three, achieved by 5 seed Louisville, who beat 2 seed California 64-57 in 2013.

=== 9 seeds ===
The only 9 seed who advanced from the Elite Eight, Arkansas in 1998, was defeated in the Final Four by one-seed Tennessee, 86-58.

=== 7 seeds ===
Although two 7 seeds have advanced from the Sweet Sixteen, both were defeated in the Final Four: Minnesota to second-seeded UConn, 67-58 in 2004, and Washington to fourth-seeded Syracuse, 80-59 in 2016.

=== 6 seeds ===
Although two 6 seeds have advanced from the Elite Eight, neither faced a 1 seed (which winning against would be considered an official upset), and both were defeated in the Final Four: Alabama to fourth-seeded Louisiana Tech, 69-66 in 1994, and Notre Dame to third-seeded Tennessee, 80-66 in 1997.

== National Championship ==
To date, no team has ever completed an official upset in the National Championship. The most seed lines apart a winning lower seed has been is two, achieved by 3 seed Tennessee, who beat 1 seed Old Dominion 68-59 in 1997.

The lowest seed to ever make a National Championship is 5 seed Louisville in 2013, who lost to 1 seed UConn 93–60.

The lowest seed to ever win a National Championship is a 3 seed, achieved by 1994 North Carolina, 1997 Tennessee, and 2023 LSU.

== See also ==
- NCAA Division I men's basketball tournament upsets
