= Mike Newell (basketball) =

American college basketball coach (born 1951)

Biographical details
- Born: May 26, 1951 (age 75)

Playing career
- 1970–1973: Sam Houston State

Coaching career (HC unless noted)
- ?–1980: San Jacinto
- 1980–1984: Oklahoma (assistant)
- 1984–1990: Arkansas–Little Rock
- 1990–1993: Lamar
- 2001–2010: Arkansas–Monticello
- 2011–2013: West Alabama
- 2015–2022: Dillard

Accomplishments and honors

Championships
- 3× TAAC tournament championship (1986, 1989, 1990); 2× GCAC Men's Basketball tournament championship (2016, 2017); GCAC regular season championship (2017)

Awards
- 2× TAAC Coach of the Year (1986, 1989)

Mike Newell (born May 26, 1951) is an American men's college basketball coach, most recently serving as head coach at Dillard University in New Orleans, Louisiana.

Newell played college basketball for Sam Houston State. His coaching break came as an assistant to Billy Tubbs at Oklahoma, who hired him away from San Jacinto College. After four years at OU, Newell became head coach at Arkansas–Little Rock, a program that had experienced little success. The Trojans notably upset heavily-favored Notre Dame in the 1986 NCAA tournament. After six seasons in Little Rock, Newell was named head coach at Lamar, on former Cardinals coach Tubbs' recommendation. However, three seasons later Newell resigned under allegations of verbal abuse towards players.

Newell took several years off from coaching, returning to lead West Alabama in 2011. After two years with the Tigers and nine seasons at Arkansas–Monticello, Newell was hired as head coach at NAIA school Dillard in 2015 following a season where the Bleu Devils won only five games. In only his second season, Newell led the team to a Gulf Coast Athletic Conference title.
