= 1985–86 Notre Dame Fighting Irish men's basketball team =

American college basketball season

1985–86 Notre Dame Fighting Irish men's basketball

NCAA tournament
- Conference: Independent

Ranking
- Coaches: No. 11
- AP: No. 10
- Record: 23–6
- Head coach: Digger Phelps (15th season)
- Home arena: Athletic & Convocation Center

1985–86 NCAA Division I men's basketball independents standings
	Conf.				Overall
Team	W		L	PCT	W		L	PCT
No. 10 Notre Dame	-	–	-	–	23	–	6	.793
Chicago State	-	–	-	–	22	–	6	.786
Eastern Washington	-	–	-	–	20	–	8	.714
Texas–Pan American	-	–	-	–	20	–	8	.714
Marquette	-	–	-	–	19	–	11	.633
DePaul	-	–	-	–	18	–	13	.581
New Orleans	-	–	-	–	16	–	12	.571
Dayton	-	–	-	–	17	–	13	.567
Southwestern Louisiana	-	–	-	–	15	–	13	.536
Miami (Fla.)	-	–	-	–	14	–	14	.500
Tennessee State	-	–	-	–	14	–	14	.500
Utica	-	–	-	–	13	–	14	.481
Florida A&M	-	–	-	–	12	–	16	.429
Brooklyn	-	–	-	–	9	–	22	.290
U.S. International	-	–	-	–	8	–	20	.286
Texas–San Antonio	-	–	-	–	7	–	24	.226
Central Florida	-	–	-	–	6	–	22	.214
Rankings from AP Poll

The 1985–86 Notre Dame Fighting Irish men's basketball team represented the University of Notre Dame during the 1985-86 college basketball season. The Irish were led by head coach Digger Phelps, in his 15th season, and played their home games at the Athletic & Convocation Center in Notre Dame, Indiana. The Irish completed a perfect season at home (15–0). Notre Dame earned an at-large bid to the NCAA tournament where they were upset by Arkansas–Little Rock in the opening round.

The team finished with a 23–6 record and a No. 10 ranking in the final AP poll.

== Roster ==
1985–86 Notre Dame Fighting Irish men's basketball team
Players
Coaches

Pos.	#	Name	Height	Weight	Year	Hometown
G	4	David Rivers	6 ft 2 in (1.88 m)	170 lb (77 kg)	So	Jersey City, New Jersey
F	15	Donald Royal	6 ft 8 in (2.03 m)	205 lb (93 kg)	Jr	New Orleans, Louisiana
F/C	41	Tim Kempton	6 ft 10 in (2.08 m)	240 lb (109 kg)	Sr	Jamaica, New York
		Joseph Price	6 ft 5 in (1.96 m)	200 lb (91 kg)	Sr	Marion, Indiana

Head coach

- Digger Phelps (Rider)

Assistant coach(es)

Legend

- (C) Team captain
- (S) Suspended
- (I) Ineligible
- (W) Walk-on
- Injured
- Current redshirt

== Schedule and results ==
Date time, TV	Rank^{#}	Opponent^{#}	Result	Record	Site city, state
Regular Season
Nov 22, 1985*	No. 12	Saint Joseph's (IN)	W 79–49	1–0	Athletic & Convocation Center; Notre Dame, Indiana
Nov 30, 1985*	No. 11	Butler	W 87–56	1–0	Athletic & Convocation Center; Notre Dame, Indiana
Dec 3, 1985*	No. 10	at No. 19 Indiana	L 67–82	1–1	Assembly Hall; Bloomington, Indiana
Dec 7, 1985*	No. 10	Loyola–Chicago	W 71–58	2–1	Athletic & Convocation Center; Notre Dame, Indiana
Dec 9, 1985*	No. 17	Oregon	W 72–63	3–1	Athletic & Convocation Center; Notre Dame, Indiana
Dec 21, 1985*	No. 19	Valparaiso	W 98–54	4–1	Athletic & Convocation Center; Notre Dame, Indiana
Dec 30, 1985*	No. 17	Creighton	W 80–54	5–1	Athletic & Convocation Center; Notre Dame, Indiana
Jan 4, 1986*	No. 17	at La Salle	W 77–63	6–1	The Palestra; Philadelphia, Pennsylvania
Jan 7, 1986*	No. 16	at Providence	W 78–72	7–1	Providence Civic Center; Providence, Rhode Island
Jan 11, 1986*	No. 16	at DePaul	W 70–54	8–1	Rosemont Horizon; Rosemont, Illinois
Jan 13, 1986*	No. 13	at BYU	L 76–80	8–2	Marriott Center; Provo, Utah
Jan 18, 1986*	No. 13	UCLA	W 74–64	9–2	Athletic & Convocation Center (11,345); Notre Dame, Indiana
Jan 20, 1986*	No. 16	Hofstra	W 91–67	10–2	Athletic & Convocation Center; Notre Dame, Indiana
Jan 22, 1986*	No. 16	American	W 67–56	11–2	Athletic & Convocation Center; Notre Dame, Indiana
Jan 26, 1986*	No. 16	at No. 1 North Carolina	L 61–73	11–3	Dean Smith Center; Chapel Hill, North Carolina
Jan 29, 1986*	No. 14	Utah	W 94–64	12–3	Athletic & Convocation Center; Notre Dame, Indiana
Feb 1, 1986*	No. 14	Marquette	W 72–70	13–3	Athletic & Convocation Center; Notre Dame, Indiana
Feb 3, 1986*	No. 14	Maryland	W 69–62	14–3	Athletic & Convocation Center; Notre Dame, Indiana
Feb 5, 1986*	No. 14	at Dayton	L 65–67	14–4	University of Dayton Arena; Dayton, Ohio
Feb 8, 1986*	No. 14	at No. 8 Syracuse	W 85–81	15–4	Carrier Dome; Syracuse, New York
Feb 11, 1986*	No. 14	Fordham	W 81–58	16–4	Athletic & Convocation Center; Notre Dame, Indiana
Feb 16, 1986*	No. 14	at No. 2 Duke	L 74–75	16–5	Cameron Indoor Stadium; Durham, North Carolina
Feb 19, 1986*	No. 14	vs. Manhattan	W 102–47	17–5	Madison Square Garden; New York, New York
Feb 22, 1986*	No. 14	at Miami (FL)	W 126–73	18–5	Knight Center; Miami, Florida
Feb 25, 1986*	No. 12	DePaul	W 70–59	19–5	Athletic & Convocation Center; Notre Dame, Indiana
Mar 1, 1986*	No. 12	at Marquette	W 74–66	20–5	MECCA Arena; Milwaukee, Wisconsin
Mar 3, 1986*	No. 12	at New Orleans	W 75–67	21–5	Lakefront Arena; New Orleans, Louisiana
Mar 8, 1986*	No. 12	Dayton	W 69–55	22–5	Athletic & Convocation Center; Notre Dame, Indiana
NCAA Tournament
Mar 14, 1986*	(3 MW) No. 10	vs. (14 MW) Arkansas–Little Rock; First round	L 83–90	23–6	Hubert H. Humphrey Metrodome; Minneapolis, Minnesota
*Non-conference game. ^{#}Rankings from AP Poll/UPI Poll. (#) Tournament seedings in parentheses.
