= 1989 TAAC men's basketball tournament =

- Classification: Division I
- Season: 1988–89
- Teams: 8
- Site: Barton Coliseum; Little Rock, AR
- Champions: Arkansas–Little Rock (2nd title)
- Winning coach: Mike Newell (2nd title)
- MVP: Jeff Cummings (Arkansas–Little Rock)
- TAAC men's basketball tournaments

1988–89 Trans America Athletic Conference men's basketball standings
	Conf.				Overall
Team	W		L	PCT	W		L	PCT
Georgia Southern	16	–	2	.889	23	–	6	.793
Arkansas–Little Rock †	14	–	4	.778	23	–	8	.742
Stetson	10	–	8	.556	17	–	12	.586
Centenary (LA)	9	–	9	.500	16	–	14	.533
Georgia State	9	–	9	.500	14	–	14	.500
Mercer	9	–	9	.500	14	–	14	.500
UTSA	8	–	10	.444	15	–	13	.536
Houston Baptist	6	–	12	.333	9	–	20	.310
Samford	5	–	13	.278	8	–	19	.296
Hardin-Simmons	4	–	14	.222	8	–	19	.296
† 1989 TAAC tournament winner Rankings from AP Poll

The 1989 Trans America Athletic Conference men's basketball tournament (now known as the ASUN men's basketball tournament) was held March 7–9 at Barton Coliseum in Little Rock, Arkansas.

Arkansas–Little Rock easily defeated Centenary (LA) in the championship game, 100–72, to win their second TAAC/Atlantic Sun men's basketball tournament. The Trojans, therefore, received an automatic bid to the 1989 NCAA tournament, where they lost to Louisville in the first round.

For the third straight year, only the top eight teams (out of 10) in the conference standings were invited to the tournament.

== Bracket ==
Quarterfinals; Tuesday, March 7
1	Georgia Southern	72
8	Houston Baptist	78
5	Centenary (LA)	76
4	Mercer	74
3	Stetson	106
6	Georgia State	63
7	Texas–San Antonio	79
2	Arkansas–Little Rock	82

Semifinals; Wednesday, March 8
8	Houston Baptist	69
5	Centenary (LA)	76
3	Stetson	59
2	Arkansas–Little Rock	60

Championship; Thursday, March 9
5	Centenary (LA)	72
2	Arkansas–Little Rock	100
