= 1990 TAAC men's basketball tournament =

- Classification: Division I
- Season: 1989–90
- Teams: 8
- Site: Barton Coliseum; Little Rock, AR
- Champions: Arkansas–Little Rock (3rd title)
- Winning coach: Mike Newell (3rd title)
- MVP: Derrick Owens (Arkansas–Little Rock)
- TAAC men's basketball tournaments

1989–90 Trans America Athletic Conference men's basketball standings
	Conf.				Overall
Team	W		L	PCT	W		L	PCT
Centenary	14	–	2	.875	22	–	8	.733
UTSA	13	–	3	.813	22	–	7	.759
Arkansas–Little Rock †	12	–	4	.750	20	–	10	.667
Georgia Southern	11	–	5	.688	17	–	11	.607
Stetson	8	–	8	.500	15	–	17	.469
Hardin–Simmons	5	–	11	.313	9	–	18	.333
Samford	4	–	12	.250	6	–	22	.214
Georgia State	3	–	13	.188	5	–	23	.179
Mercer	2	–	14	.125	7	–	20	.259
† 1990 TAAC tournament winner Rankings from AP Poll

The 1990 Trans America Athletic Conference men's basketball tournament (now known as the ASUN men's basketball tournament) was held March 6–8 at Barton Coliseum in Little Rock, Arkansas.

In a rematch of the 1989 final, Arkansas–Little Rock upset top-seeded Centenary (LA) in the championship game, 105–95, to win their third (and second consecutive) TAAC/Atlantic Sun men's basketball tournament.

The Trojans, therefore, received the TAAC's automatic bid to the 1990 NCAA tournament, where they lost to eventual-champion UNLV in the first round.

Houston Baptist departed the TAAC prior to the season, leaving the conference membership at nine. Nonetheless, only the top eight teams in the conference standings were invited to the tournament.

== Bracket ==
Quarterfinals; Tuesday, March 6
1	Centenary (LA)	102
8	Georgia State	91
5	Stetson	80
4	Georgia Southern	55
3	Arkansas–Little Rock	91
6	Hardin–Simmons	68
7	Samford	85
2	Texas–San Antonio	98

Semifinals; Wednesday, March 7
1	Centenary (LA)	97
5	Stetson	93
3	Arkansas–Little Rock	99
2	Texas–San Antonio	83

Championship; Thursday, March 8
1	Centenary (LA)	95
3	Arkansas–Little Rock	105
