= Little Rock Trojans men's basketball =

Men's college basketball team

2026–27 Little Rock Trojans men's basketball team
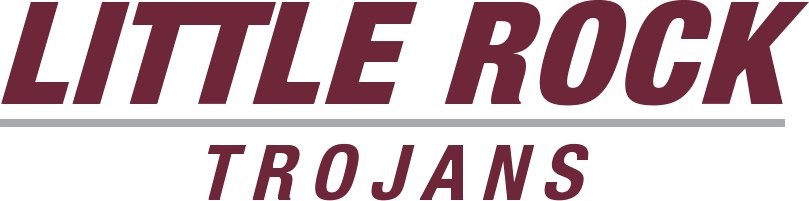
- University: University of Arkansas at Little Rock
- First season: 1930–31; 96 years ago
- Athletic director: Frank M. Cuervo
- Head coach: Travis Ford; 1st season, 0–0 (–)
- Location: Little Rock, Arkansas
- Arena: Jack Stephens Center (capacity: 5,600)
- NCAA division: Division I
- Conference: UAC
- Nickname: Trojans
- Colors: Maroon, silver, and white
- Student section: Maroon Mob
- All-time record: 779–666 (.539)
- NCAA tournament record: 2–5 (.286)

NCAA Division I tournament round of 32
- 1986, 2016

NCAA Division I tournament appearances
- 1986, 1989, 1990, 2011, 2016

Conference tournament champions
- TAAC/ASUN: 1986, 1989, 1990 Sun Belt: 2011, 2016

Conference regular-season champions
- TAAC/ASUN: 1982, 1983, 1986, 1987, 1988 SBC: 1996, 2009, 2016, 2020 OVC: 2024

Conference division champions
- 2004, 2005, 2008, 2009, 2012

Uniforms
Home	Away

The Little Rock Trojans men's basketball team (formerly branded as the Arkansas–Little Rock Trojans) represents the University of Arkansas at Little Rock in Little Rock, Arkansas, United States. The Trojans joined the Ohio Valley Conference (OVC) in 2022 after 31 seasons in the Sun Belt Conference. After the 2025–26 season, Little Rock joined the United Athletic Conference (UAC). They are led by first-year head coach Travis Ford. They play their home games at the Jack Stephens Center. The Trojans have made five NCAA tournament appearances, most recently in 2016.

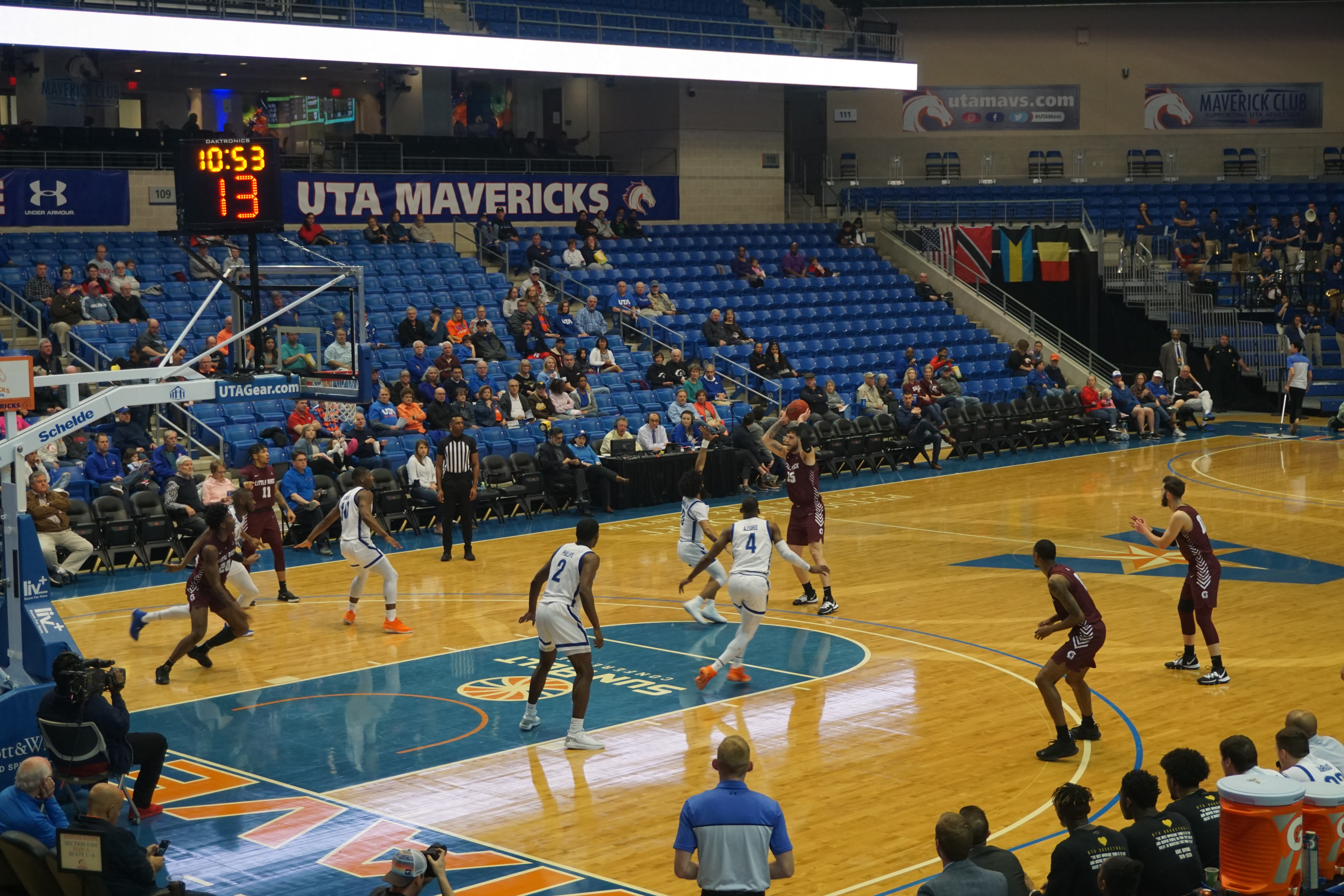
The Trojans in action against the UT Arlington Mavericks in 2020

== Rebranding ==
On July 1, 2015, the Trojans officially announced they would no longer be branded as "Arkansas-Little Rock" or "UALR," but will be the Little Rock Trojans effective immediately.

== Staff ==
The following are the staff members of the Little Rock Trojans men's basketball team:

Name	Position
Travis Ford	Head coach
Charles Baker	Assistant coach
Charles Thomas	Assistant coach
Evan Eustachy	Assistant coach
Tyler Milchman	Director of Basketball Operations
Caleb Jones	Video Coordinator

== Conference affiliations ==
- 1930–31 to 1978–79 – Independent (no team during the 1939–40 to 1940–41, 1944–45, and 1956–57 to 1960–61 seasons)
- 1961–62 to 1976–77 – Arkansas Intercollegiate Conference
- 1977–78 to 1978–79 – NCAA Division I Independent
- 1979–80 to 1990–91 – Trans-America Athletic Conference (Note: Currently known as the Atlantic Sun Conference (ASUN) since 2001.)
- 1991–92 to 2021–22 – Sun Belt Conference
- 2022–23 to 2025–26 – Ohio Valley Conference
- 2026–27 to Future – United Athletic Conference

== Postseason results ==
=== NCAA tournament results ===
The Trojans have appeared in the NCAA tournament five times. Their combined record is 2–5.

Year	Seed	Round	Opponent	Result
1986	14	First Round; Second Round	(3) Notre Dame (6) NC State	W 90–83; L 66–80^{OT}
1989	13	First Round	(4) Louisville	L 71–76
1990	16	First Round	(1) UNLV	L 72–102
2011	16	First Four	(16) UNC Asheville	L 77–81^{OT}
2016	12	First Round; Second Round	(5) Purdue (4) Iowa State	W 85–83^{2OT} L 61–78

=== NIT results ===
The Trojans have appeared in the National Invitation Tournament (NIT) three times. Their combined record is 3–4.

Year	Round	Opponent	Result
1987	First Round; Second Round; Quarterfinals; Semifinals; 3rd Place Game	Baylor; Stephen F. Austin; California; La Salle; Nebraska	W 42–41; W 54–48; W 80–73; L 73–92; L 67–76
1988	First Round	Louisiana Tech	L 56–66
1996	First Round	Vanderbilt	L 80–86

=== CBI results ===
The Trojans have appeared in the College Basketball Invitational (CBI) one time. Their combined record is 0–1.

Year	Round	Opponent	Result
2024	First round	Fairfield	L 75–82

== Notable players ==
- Kris Bankston (born 1999), basketball player in the Israeli Basketball Premier League
- Derek Fisher (born 1974), former basketball player & NBA champion with the Los Angeles Lakers
- Kamani Johnson (born 1998), basketball player in the NBA G League
- Lis Shoshi (born 1994), Kosovan professional basketball player who has played on the Kosovo national team and for professional club teams in Kosovo, Lithuania, and Israel
- Myron Gardner (born 2001) NBA player for the Miami Heat.
