= Loyola Marymount Lions men's basketball statistical leaders =

The Loyola Marymount Lions men's basketball statistical leaders are individual statistical leaders of the Loyola Marymount Lions men's basketball program in various categories, including points, rebounds, assists, steals, and blocks. Within those areas, the lists identify single-game, single-season, and career leaders. The Lions represent Loyola Marymount University in the NCAA's West Coast Conference.

Loyola Marymount began competing in intercollegiate basketball in 1906. However, the school's record book does not generally list records from before the 1950s, as records from before this period are often incomplete and inconsistent. Since scoring was much lower in this era, and teams played much fewer games during a typical season, it is likely that few or no players from this era would appear on these lists anyway.

The NCAA did not officially record assists as a stat until the 1983–84 season, and blocks and steals until the 1985–86 season, but Loyola Marymount's record books includes players in these stats before these seasons. These lists are updated through the end of the 2020–21 season.

== Scoring ==
Career
Rk	Player	Points	Seasons
1	Hank Gathers	2490	1987–88 1988–89 1989–90
2	Terrell Lowery	2201	1988–89 1989–90 1990–91 1991–92
3	Anthony Ireland	2169	2010–11 2011–12 2012–13 2013–14
4	Forrest McKenzie	2060	1981–82 1982–83 1983–84 1985–86
5	Bo Kimble	2010	1987–88 1988–89 1989–90
6	Eli Scott	2002	2017–18 2018–19 2019–20 2020–21 2021–22
7	Keith Smith	1980	1982–83 1983–84 1984–85 1985–86
8	Jeff Fryer	1922	1986–87 1987–88 1988–89 1989–90
9	Jim Haderlein	1706	1968–69 1969–70 1970–71
10	Mike Yoest	1601	1984–85 1985–86 1986–87 1987–88

Season
Rk	Player	Points	Season
1	Bo Kimble	1131	1989–90
2	Hank Gathers	1015	1988–89
3	Terrell Lowery	884	1990–91
4	Hank Gathers	754	1989–90
5	Hank Gathers	721	1987–88
6	Jeff Fryer	710	1988–89
7	Anthony Ireland	688	2012–13
8	Keith Smith	678	1984–85
9	Terrell Lowery	675	1991–92
10	Cam Shelton	664	2022–23

Single game
Rk	Player	Points	Season	Opponent
1	Bo Kimble	54	1989–90	St. Joseph's
2	Bo Kimble	53	1989–90	Oregon State
3	Bo Kimble	51	1989–90	UC Santa Barbara
4	Bo Kimble	50	1989–90	San Francisco
5	Jim McCloskey	49	1979–80	Saint Mary's
	Hank Gathers	49	1988–89	Nevada
7	Terrell Lowery	48	1990–91	Idaho State
	Hank Gathers	48	1989–90	Louisiana State
9	Bo Kimble	46	1989–90	Oklahoma
10	Bo Kimble	45	1989–90	New Mexico State

== Rebounds ==
Career
Rk	Player	Rebounds	Seasons
1	Jim Haderlein	1161	1968–69 1969–70 1970–71
2	Hank Gathers	985	1987–88 1988–89 1989–90
3	Eli Scott	936	2017–18 2018–19 2019–20 2020–21 2021–22
4	Mark Armstrong	825	1984–85 1985–86 1986–87 1987–88
5	Ed Bento	774	1959–60 1960–61 1961–62
6	Tom Ryan	752	1958–59 1959–60 1960–61
7	Matthew Knight	743	2003–04 2004–05 2005–06 2006–07
8	Forrest McKenzie	723	1981–82 1982–83 1983–84 1985–86
9	Brad Dean	722	1972–73 1973–74 1974–75
10	Steve Smith	714	1971–72 1972–73

Season
Rk	Player	Rebounds	Season
1	Jim Haderlein	442	1969–70
2	Hank Gathers	426	1988–89
3	Jim Haderlein	375	1970–71
4	Tom Ryan	362	1959–60
5	Steve Smith	357	1972–73
	Steve Smith	357	1971–72
7	John Kurtz	345	1951–52
8	Jim Haderlein	344	1968–69
9	Bob Cox	343	1953–54
10	Bill Wagner	302	1958–59

Single game
Rk	Player	Rebounds	Season	Opponent
1	Hank Gathers	29	1988–89	U.S. International
2	Jim Haderlein	28	1969–70	San Francisco
3	Hank Gathers	27	1989–90	U.S. International
4	Hank Gathers	26	1988–89	Nevada
5	Jim Haderlein	25	1969–70	San Diego
	Ed Bento	25	1961–62	Hawaii
	Cal Garvin	25	1952–53	CS Los Angeles
8	Jim Haderlein	24	1969–70	Nevada
9	Hank Gathers	23	1988–89	U.S. International
10	Ime Oduok	22	1993–94	Buffalo
	Steve Smith	22	1972–73	St. Mary's
	Steve Smith	22	1971–72	Hawaii

== Assists ==
Career
Rk	Player	Assists	Seasons
1	Terrell Lowery	689	1988–89 1989–90 1990–91 1991–92
2	Keith Smith	594	1982–83 1983–84 1984–85 1985–86
3	Anthony Ireland	557	2010–11 2011–12 2012–13 2013–14
4	Jim Williamson	506	1993–94 1994–95 1995–96 1996–97
5	Tony Walker	445	1989–90 1991–92
6	Eli Scott	444	2017–18 2018–19 2019–20 2020–21 2021–22
7	Enoch Simmons	420	1985–86 1986–87 1987–88 1988–89
8	Charles Brown	403	2001–02 2002–03 2003–04 2004–05
9	Dan Davis	392	1979–80 1980–81
10	Vernon Teel	353	2008–09 2009–10 2010–11

Season
Rk	Player	Assists	Season
1	Terrell Lowery	283	1990–91
2	Corey Gaines	271	1987–88
3	Dan Davis	229	1980–81
4	Tony Walker	227	1989–90
5	Tony Walker	218	1991–92
6	Keith Smith	202	1985–86
	Terrell Lowery	202	1989–90
	Chris Nikchevich	202	1986–87
9	Vernon Teel	190	2009–10
10	Brandon Brown	177	2015–16

Single game
Rk	Player	Assists	Season	Opponent
1	Terrell Lowery	18	1990–91	St. Joseph's
2	Chris Nikchevich	17	1986–87	Washington State
3	Terrell Lowery	16	1990–91	U.S. International
	Dan Davis	16	1979–80	Saint Mary's
5	Tony Walker	15	1991–92	San Diego
	Floyd Hooper	15	1977–78	San Francisco
7	Terrell Lowery	14	1990–91	Louisiana State
	Corey Gaines	14	1987–88	Pacific
	Greg Goorjian	14	1982–83	Pepperdine

== Steals ==
Career
Rk	Player	Steals	Seasons
1	Terrell Lowery	231	1988–89 1989–90 1990–91 1991–92
2	Anthony Ireland	200	2010–11 2011–12 2012–13 2013–14
3	Mike Yoest	189	1984–85 1985–86 1986–87 1987–88
4	Charles Brown	181	2001–02 2002–03 2003–04 2004–05
5	Rahim Harris	176	1990–91 1991–92 1992–93 1993–94
6	Bo Kimble	175	1987–88 1988–89 1989–90
7	Damian Martin	158	2003–04 2004–05 2005–06 2006–07
8	Brandon Worthy	157	2002–03 2004–05 2005–06 2006–07
9	Tom Peabody	155	1988–89 1989–90 1990–91
10	Jeff Fryer	150	1986–87 1987–88 1988–89 1989–90

Season
Rk	Player	Steals	Season
1	Bo Kimble	92	1989–90
2	Terrell Lowery	79	1990–91
3	Mike Yoest	71	1987–88
4	Damian Martin	65	2006–07
	Tony Walker	65	1989–90
	Jeffery McClendon	65	2017–18
7	Terrell Lowery	63	1989–90
8	Charles Brown	61	2002–03
	Tom Peabody	61	1989–90
	Corey Gaines	61	1987–88
	Vernon Teel	61	2009–10

Single game
Rk	Player	Steals	Season	Opponent
1	Damian Martin	9	2006–07	Boise State

== Blocks ==
Career
Rk	Player	Blocks	Seasons
1	Sherman Gay	144	2000–01 2001–02 2002–03 2003–04
2	Marin Mornar	131	2012–13 2013–14 2014–15 2015–16
3	Chris Ayer	110	2002–03 2003–04 2004–05 2005–06
4	Rick Issanza	108	2022–23 2023–24 2024–25 2025–26
5	Chris Knight	97	1988–89 1989–90 1990–91 1991–92
6	Godwin Okonji	96	2010–11 2011–12 2012–13 2014–15
7	Mattias Markusson	93	2016–17 2017–18 2018–19 2020–21
8	Ime Oduok	92	1993–94 1994–95 1995–96
9	Drew Viney	85	2009–10 2010–11 2011–12
10	Silvester Kainga	74	1997–98 1998–99

Season
Rk	Player	Blocks	Season
1	Sherman Gay	60	2002–03
2	Sherman Gay	57	2003–04
3	Richard Petruska	55	1990–91
	Silvester Kainga	55	1998–99
5	Marin Mornar	47	2014–15
6	Rick Issanza	43	2025–26
7	Ime Oduok	39	1993–94
8	Chris Ayer	38	2005–06
	Marin Mornar	38	2015–16
	Chris Knight	38	1990–91
	Godwin Okonji	38	2010–11
	Drew Viney	38	2009–10

Single game
Rk	Player	Blocks	Season	Opponent
1	Rick Issanza	7	2025–26	Ohio
	Michael Graham	7	2023–24	San Diego
	Petr Herman	7	2016–17	Pacific
	Silvester Kainga	7	1998–99	CS Fullerton
