= Long Beach Convention and Entertainment Center =

Convention center in California, United States

Long Beach Convention & Entertainment Center

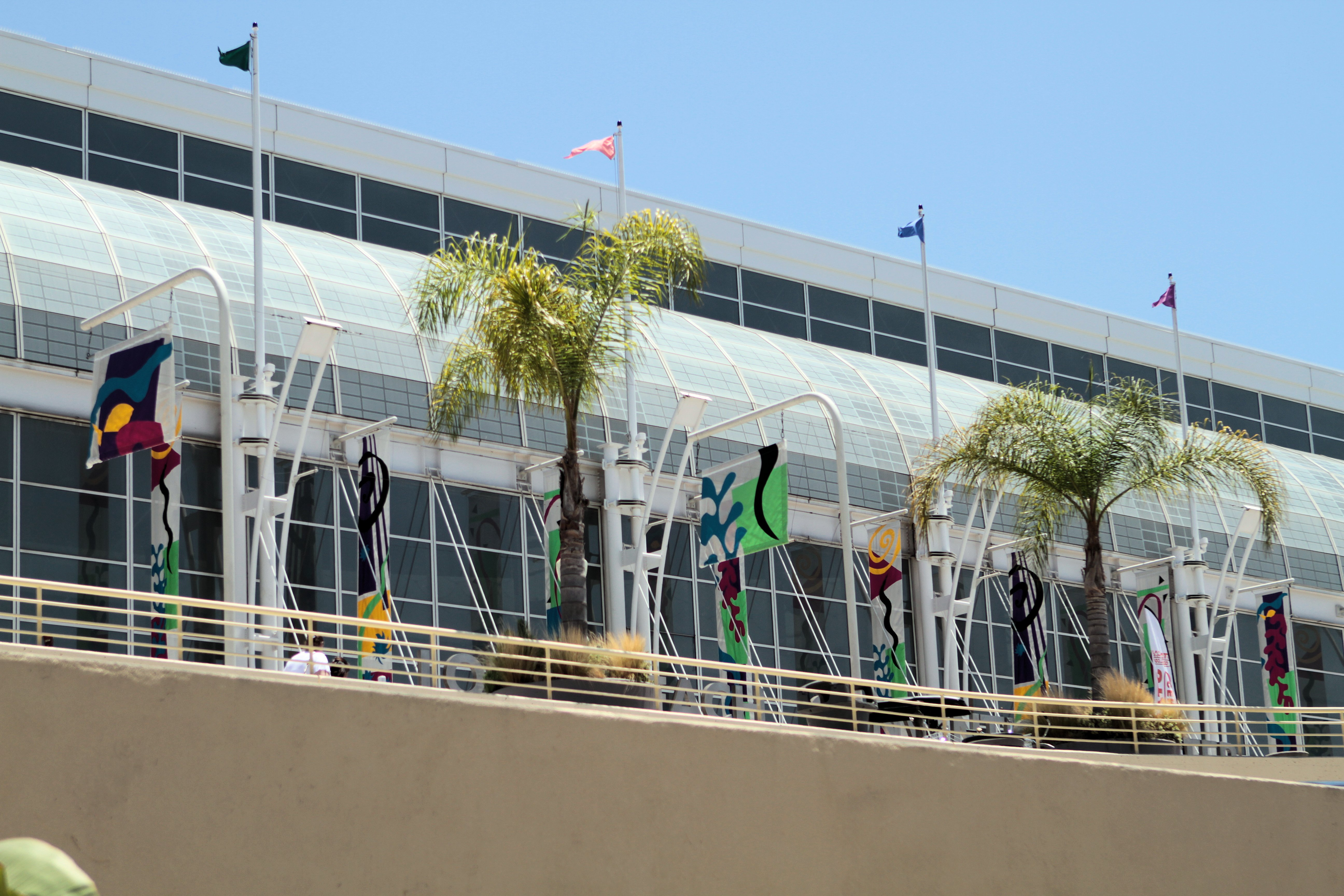
- The front facade of the convention center
- Interactive map of Long Beach Convention & Entertainment Center
- Former names: Long Beach Convention Center (1978-90); Long Beach Civic Arena
- Location: Long Beach, California
- Coordinates: 33°45′50″N 118°11′18″W
- Operator: ASM Global
- Public transit: 1st Street

Construction
- Renovated: 1994, 2013

The Long Beach Convention and Entertainment Center is a convention center located in Long Beach, California. Built on the former site of the Long Beach Municipal Auditorium, the venue is composed of the Long Beach Convention Center, Long Beach Arena, and the Long Beach Performing Arts Center. It is served by the 1st Street station of Los Angeles Metro Rail.

== History ==
=== First Municipal Auditorium ===
The first Long Beach Municipal Auditorium was completed in 1905. It was designed by Joseph Cather Newsom and could accommodate 5000.

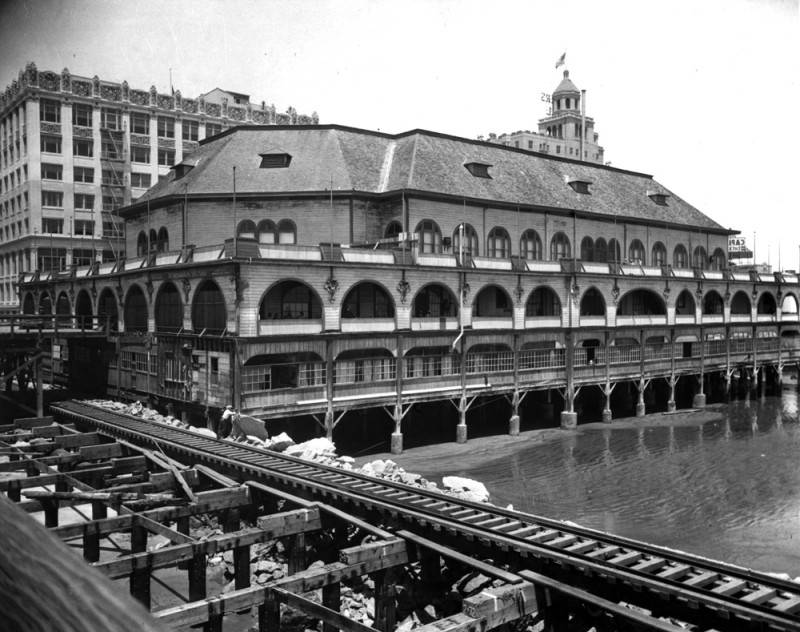
The first Municipal Auditorium, with the Jergins Trust Building in the background, c. 1929

=== 1913 Empire Day disaster ===
During the Long Beach Empire Day celebration on Saturday, May 24, part of the first and second floor wooden decks collapsed after attendees surged into the venue to hear the program of speakers and music. 34 people died at the scene, with another 4 dying later in hospital. More than 300 people were injured.

=== Second Municipal Auditorium ===
The second Municipal Auditorium was completed in 1932. It was designed by William Horace Austin. It extended 500 feet into the water at the center of the Rainbow Pier. It was demolished in 1975. Listed below are historic photos from the Municipal Auditorium.

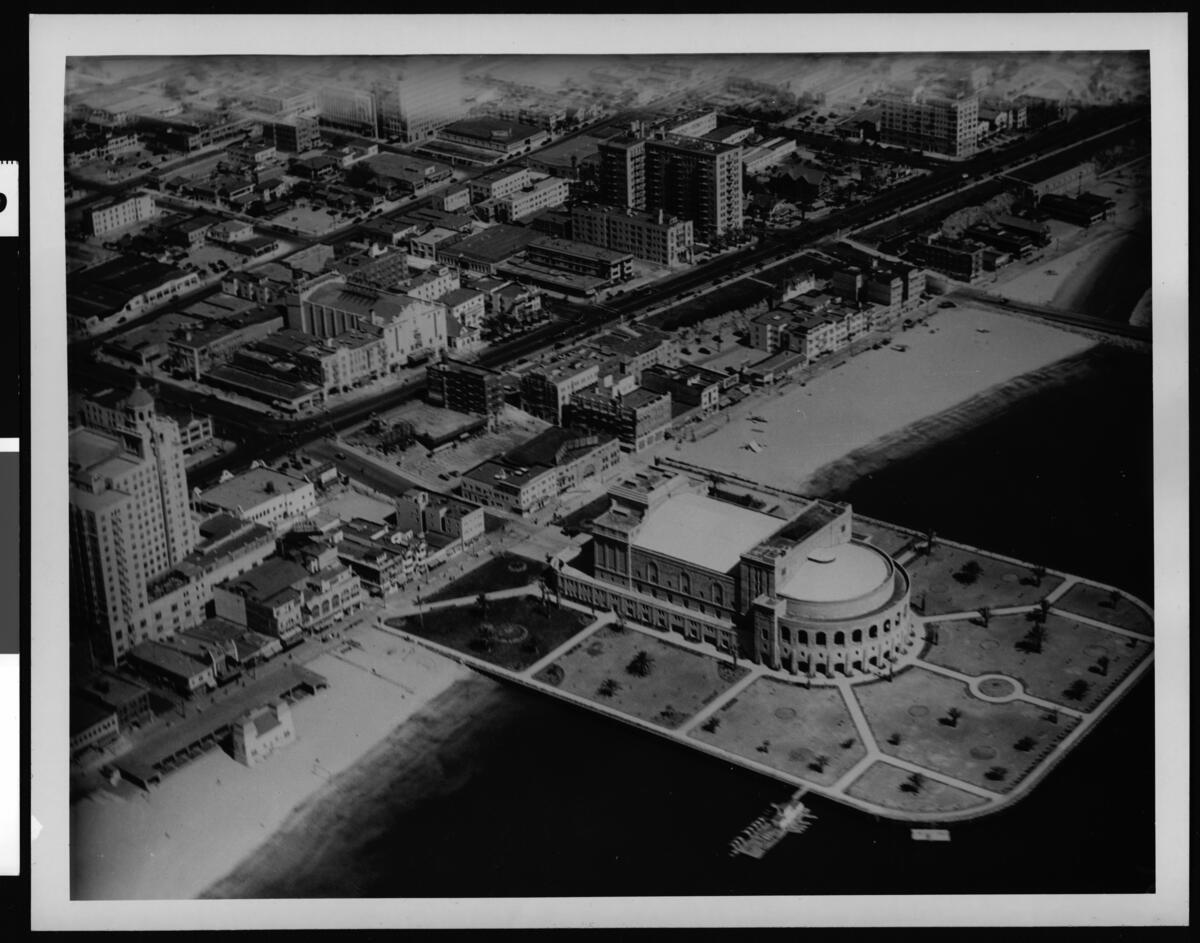
Aerial view of the second Municipal Auditorium, c. 1930

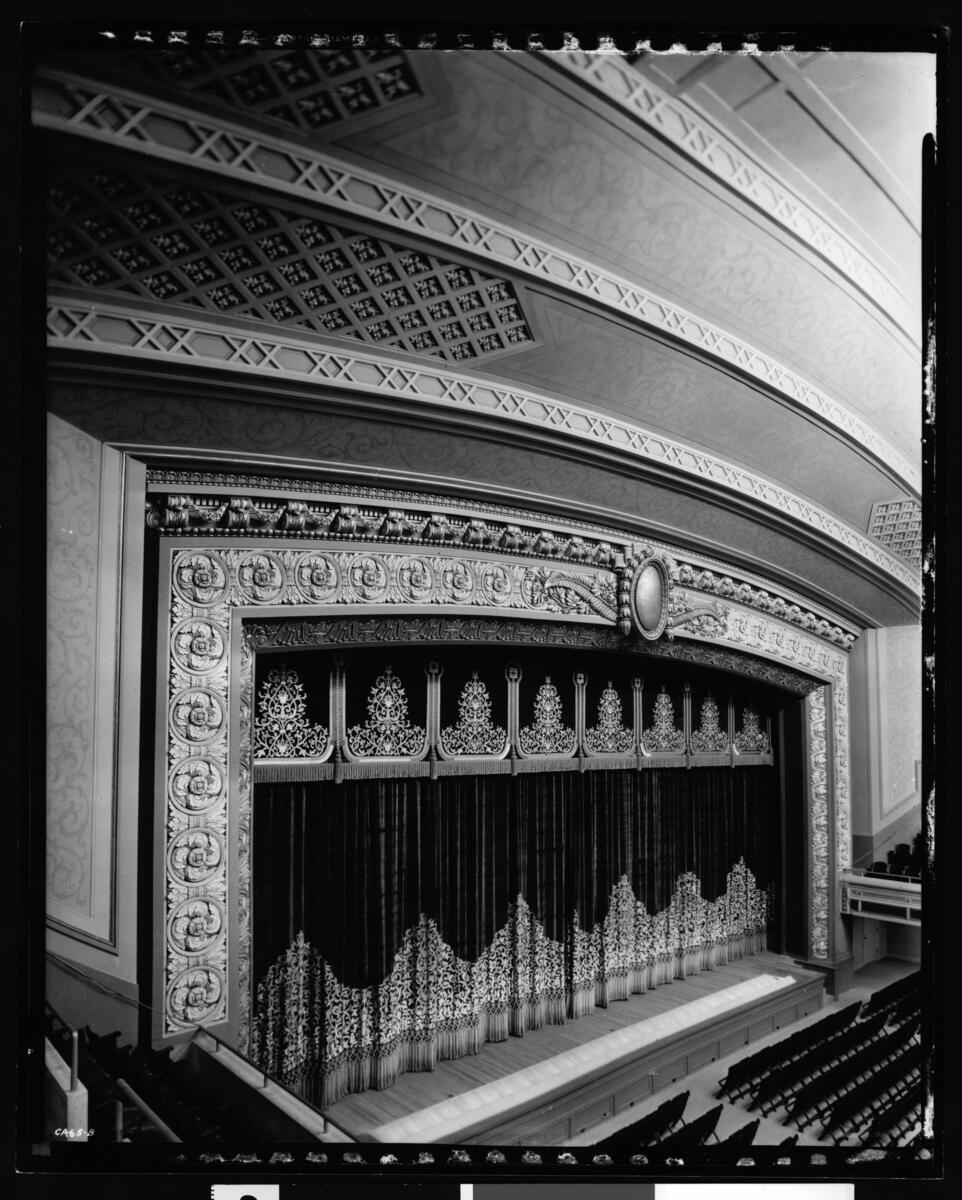
Proscenium, c. 1930

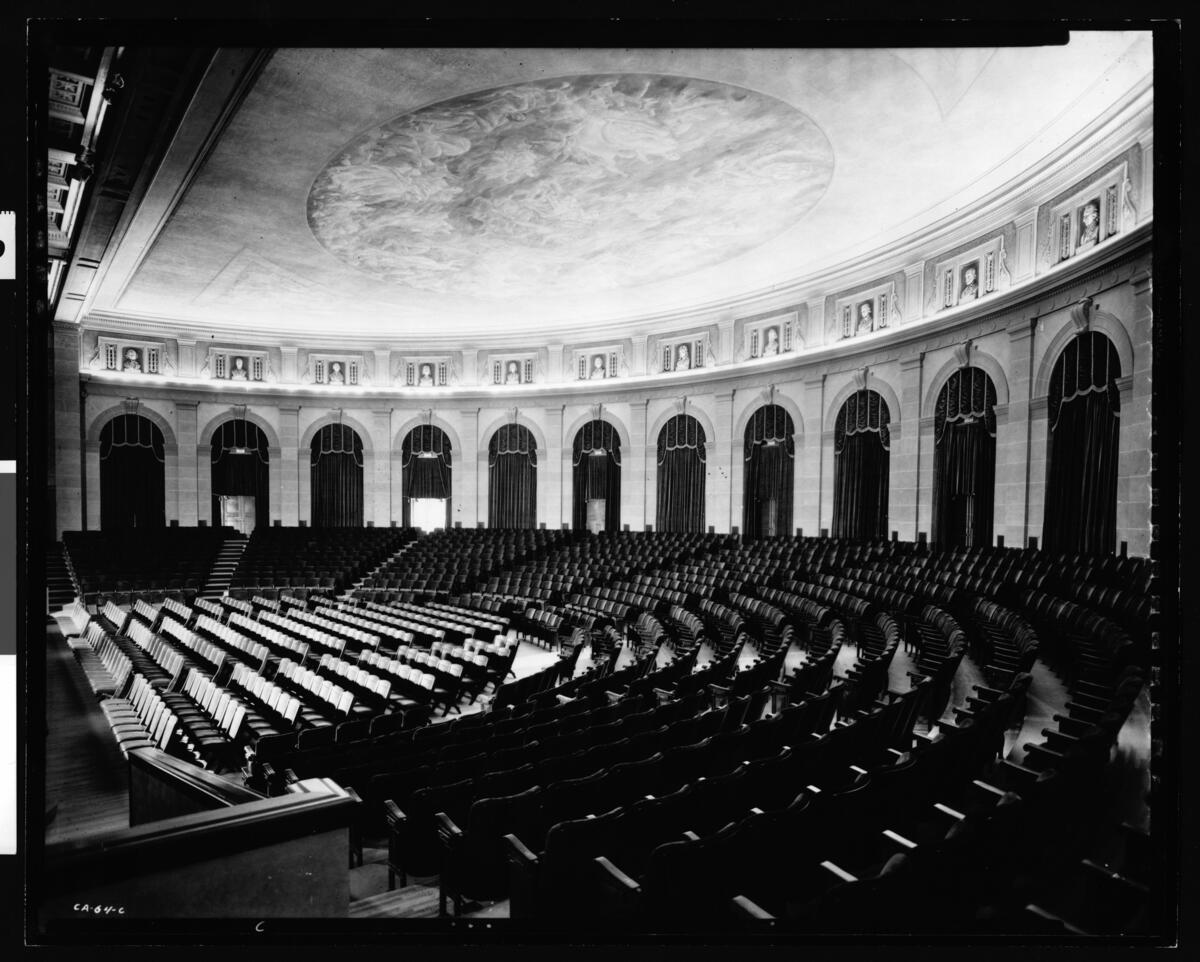
Interior view of the concert hall, c. 1930

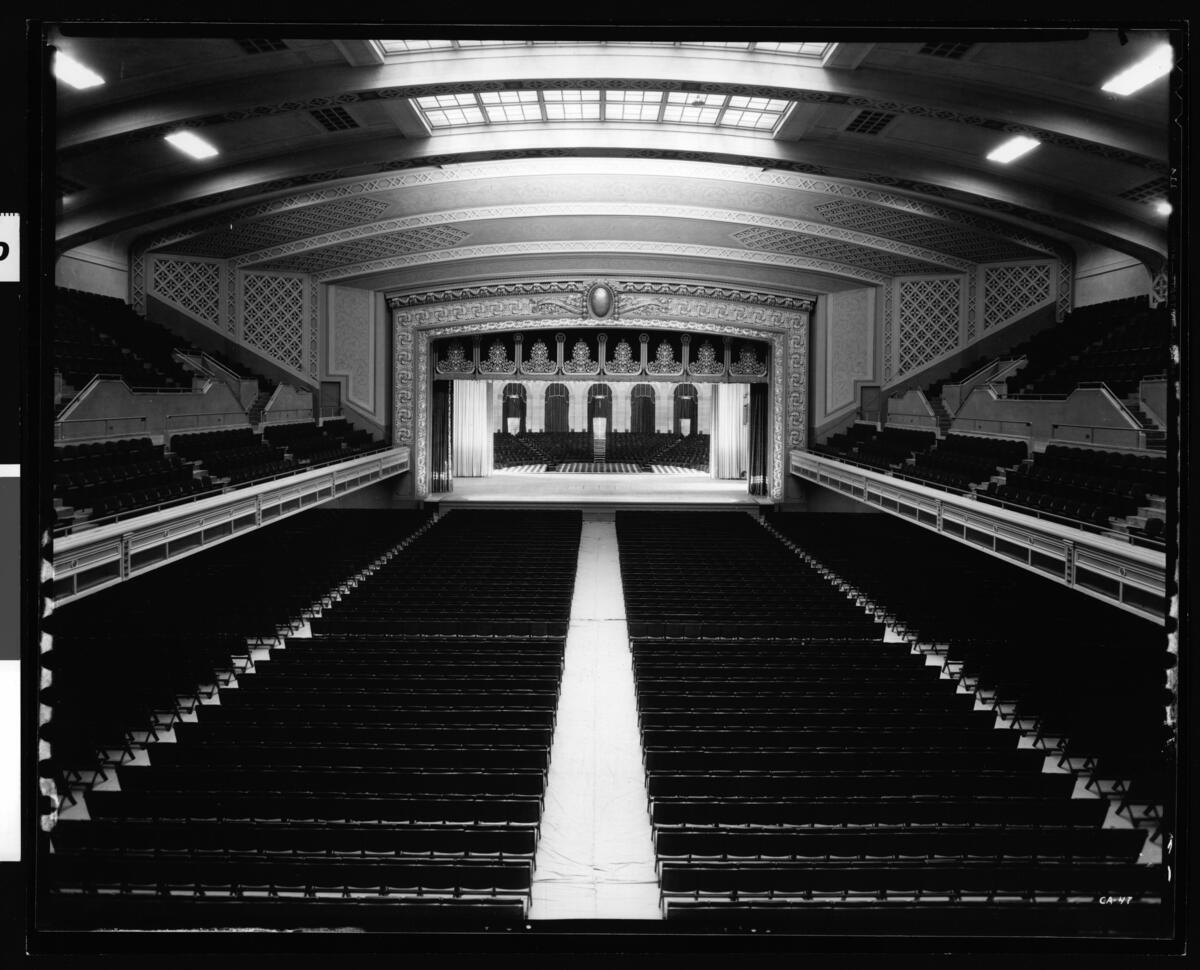
Interior view looking to stage and concert hall beyond, c. 1930

== Venues ==
Long Beach Convention Center

- Exhibit Hall A/B/C – meeting rooms include 101–104, 201-204 and seaside rooms
- Promenade Ballroom (part of the 100 series meeting rooms) – 13,200 square feet
- Top of the Lot – an open air parking structure, composed at the upper deck of the terrace parking lot
- Grand Ballroom – 20,456 square feet
- Terrace Plaza
- The Cove

Long Beach Arena

- Long Beach Arena – opened in 1962, connected to the original Long Beach Municipal Auditorium. The auditorium was demolished in 1975 to make way for the convention center.
- Pacific Ballroom – an event space within the Long Beach Arena. A flying steel truss system converts the arena floor into an intimate space for receptions and concerts. For concerts, the venue can seat 2,990–4,890. It was originally known as the "Pacific Ballroom".

Long Beach Performing Arts Center

- Terrace Theater
- Beverly O'Neill Theater

== Long Beach Convention Center ==
During the COVID-19 pandemic in California, the convention center was used as a mass vaccination site. Later in the pandemic, the convention center was used as an emergency shelter for migrant children.

The convention center and theatre portion of a complex served as host of the fencing competitions during the 1984 Summer Olympics. The convention center will again serve as an Olympic venue in 2028 as an indoor shooting range. It will also host the same event for the 2028 Summer Paralympics. Outside of the convention center, artistic swimming, water polo and sports climbing will be held during the 2028 Olympics. The grounds outside the convention center will also host swimming and Para climbing during the 2028 Summer Paralympics. Other events that the convention center an theatre have hosted included the presidential nominating conventions of the Reform Party of the United States of America in both 1996 and 2000.

== Long Beach Arena ==
Long Beach Arena
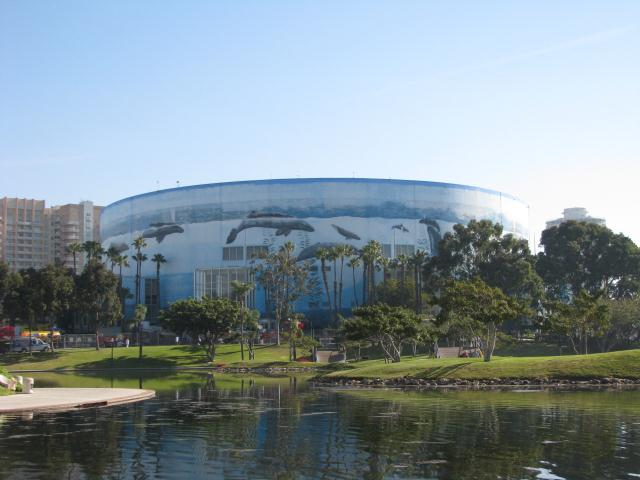
- The Wyland Whaling Wall 33, "Planet Ocean", on the exterior of the arena
- Interactive map of Long Beach Arena
- Capacity: 14,500 (concerts); 12,500 (hockey); 14,000 (basketball)

Construction
- Opened: 1962

Tenants
- Long Beach Chiefs (ABL)(1962); Los Angeles Kings (NHL) (1967); Los Angeles Sharks (WHA) (1972-74); California Surf (NASL) (1980-81); Long Beach Ice Dogs (IHL/WCHL/ECHL) (1996-2007)

Long Beach Arena was the first building to be completed in the complex. Capacities are as follows: 12,500 for hockey, 14,000 for basketball and 10,500 - 14,500 for concerts, depending on the seating arrangement.

For trade shows, the arena features 46,000 square feet (4300 m^{2}) of space, with an additional 19,000 square feet (1800 m^{2}) of space in the lobby and 29,000 square feet (2700 m^{2}) in the concourse. Hanging from the arena's 77 foot (23 m) high ceiling is a center-hung scoreboard with four White Way "Mega Color" Animation Screens. There is an 11 by 15 foot SACO Smartvision LED Wall located on the south end of the arena.

Shortly after its opening in 1962, in October, the arena became the home court for the Long Beach Chiefs (who had moved from Honolulu, were known as the Hawaii Chiefs) of the short-lived American Basketball League, though the ABL would fold on December 31 of that year. The arena was also the site of the first NHL game involving a 1967 expansion team, as the Los Angeles Kings and the Philadelphia Flyers, both expansion teams, played on October 14, 1967, the Kings won 4–2. The Kings played in Long Beach for the first half of their expansion season while The Forum was being completed.

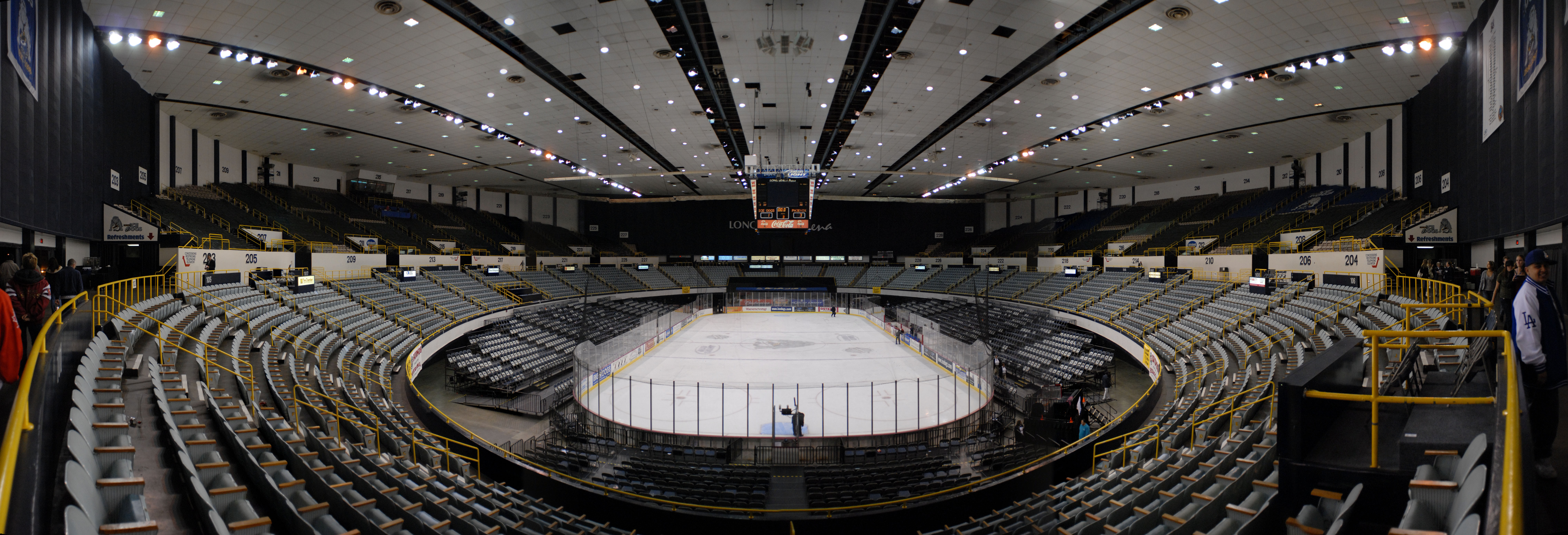
Long Beach Arena

In the 1970s, the arena hosted four games of the Los Angeles Sharks of the WHA and regular appearances of the Los Angeles Thunderbirds roller derby team. The Grateful Dead played the arena on December 15, 1972; the first of 13 concerts there through 1988.

Elvis Presley performed two shows here on November 14 and 15, 1972. He returned for two more shows on April 25, 1976 (afternoon and evening).

From 1976 until 1983 when the Grand Prix of Long Beach was known as the United States Grand Prix West, due to the lack of suitable pit facilities on the street circuit, the Long Beach Sports Arena was turned into a makeshift paddock for the Formula One teams.

In 1980–81, the arena was also home to the California Surf of the North American Soccer League for one season of indoor soccer.

The arena was home to the former Long Beach Ice Dogs team, which played professional ice hockey in the IHL, WCHL and ECHL. The Ice Dogs ceased operations of the team in 2007.

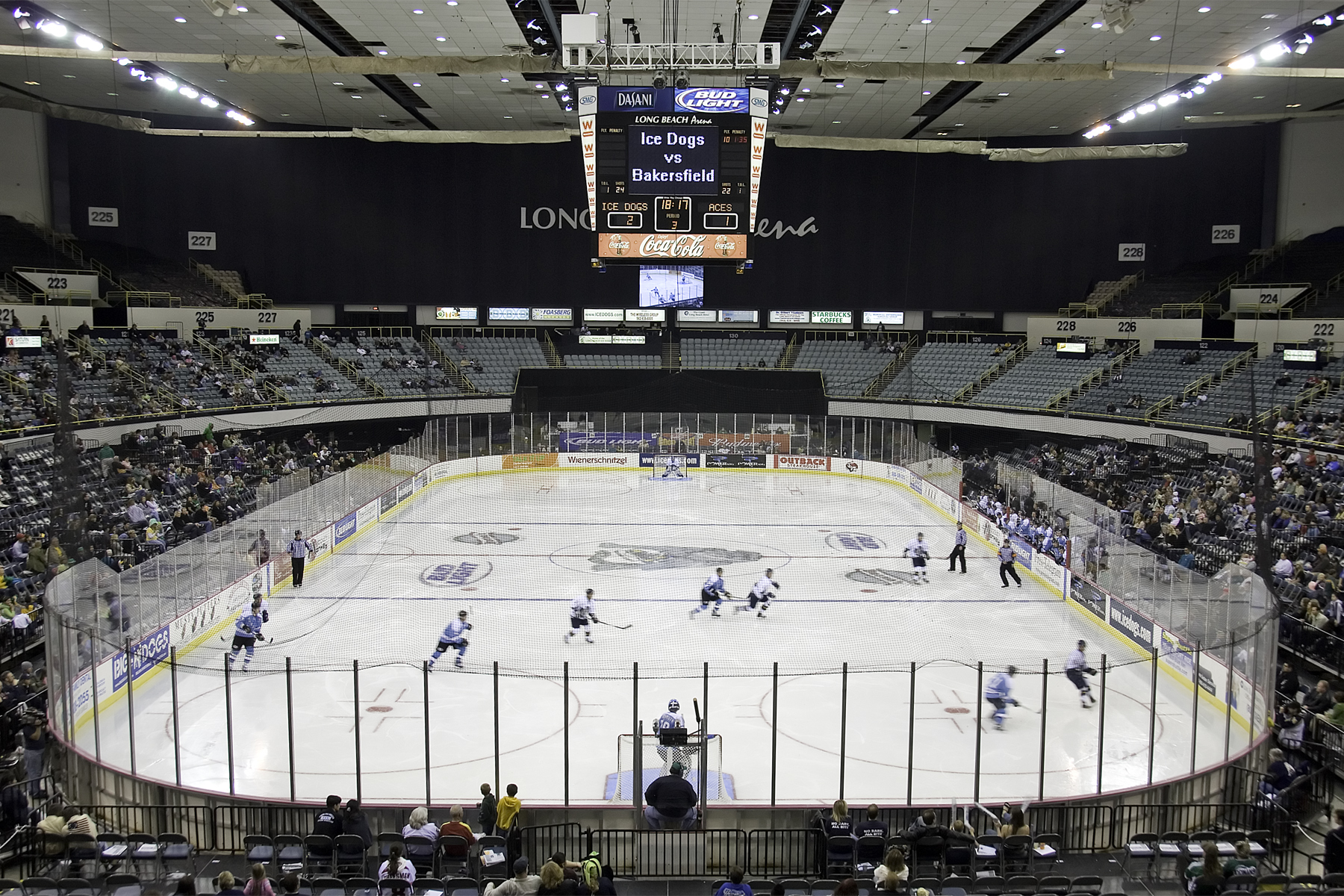
Interior of the arena

The Eagles performed during a benefit concert for California Senator Alan Cranston on July 31, 1980, on what has been described as "Long Night at Wrong Beach". Tempers boiled over as Glenn Frey and Don Felder spent the entire show telling each other about the beating each planned to administer backstage. "Only three more songs until I kick your ass, pal," Frey recalls Felder telling him near the end of the band's set. Felder recalls Frey making a similar threat to him during "Best of My Love". "We're out there singing ‘Best of My Love', but inside both of us are thinking, 'As soon as this is over, I'm gonna kill him,'" recalled Frey. The animosity purportedly developed as a result of Felder's response of "You're welcome – I guess" to Senator Cranston as he was thanking the band for doing the benefit for his reelection. A live recording of the Joe Walsh song "All Night Long" from this show was included on their live album, entitled Eagles Live. This marked their final live performance as The Eagles for nearly 14 years, until April 25, 1994.

Iron Maiden performed four consecutive shows during their World Slavery Tour on March 14–17, 1985. The show on the 15th was recorded and released as a double live-album, entitled Live After Death.

The arena was also one of the sites of the 1986 and 1990 NCAA Men's Division I Basketball Championship Rounds of 64 and 32. The teams that played at the arena in 1986 included Maryland, Pepperdine & UNLV. Maryland's Len Bias played his final collegiate game at the arena on March 16, 1986, in a loss to UNLV in the Round of 32. In 1990, the Loyola Marymount Lions, an 11 seed, defeated New Mexico State and then trounced the 3 seed and defending champion Michigan Wolverines by 34 points on their way to an Elite 8 appearance, just days after the on-court death of their star player Hank Gathers in the West Coast Conference tournament. Teammate Bo Kimble (a right-handed player) famously shot his first free throw in each game left-handed as a tribute to Gathers. The arena was also the site of the Big West Conference men's basketball tournament from 1989 to 1993. It was the home court for Long Beach State's men's basketball team for several seasons in the 1970s and 1980s.

Bon Jovi filmed the video for their number 1 single Bad Medicine from the New Jersey album at the arena on August 13, 1988.

Run–D.M.C. performed during their Raising Hell Tour on August 17, 1986, with Whodini, LL Cool J, The Beastie Boys and The Timex Social Club as their opening acts. The show made news worldwide when gang fights broke out between the Long Beach-based Insane Crips and the Los Angeles-based Rollin 60's Crips within the audience, with 42 reported injuries during the incident.

Iron Maiden, Motörhead, Dio performed at Long Beach Arena on August 25, 2003.

From 2009 to 2016, the FIRST Robotics Competition Los Angeles Regional was held at the Long Beach Arena.

On July 1 and 2, 2017, the arena hosted New Japan Pro-Wrestling's G1 Special in USA shows, which marked the company's first independently promoted shows in the United States.

In October 2018, PFL 9, a mixed martial arts event was held at the arena.

During the COVID-19 pandemic in California, the Arena was converted into a medical facility but was never utilized.

The arena hosted the General Conference of the United Pentecostal Church International from October 1 to October 4, 2024. By September 23, over 13,000 people had registered for the event.

The Fox game show Game of Talents is filmed at the arena.

The arena has hosted various entertainment and professional and college sporting events, most notably the volleyball events of the 1984 Summer Olympic Games. The arena will also host handball during the 2028 Summer Olympics and sitting volleyball during the 2028 Summer Paralympics. Projects totaling $50 million are planned for the Convention Center.

== Wyland murals ==
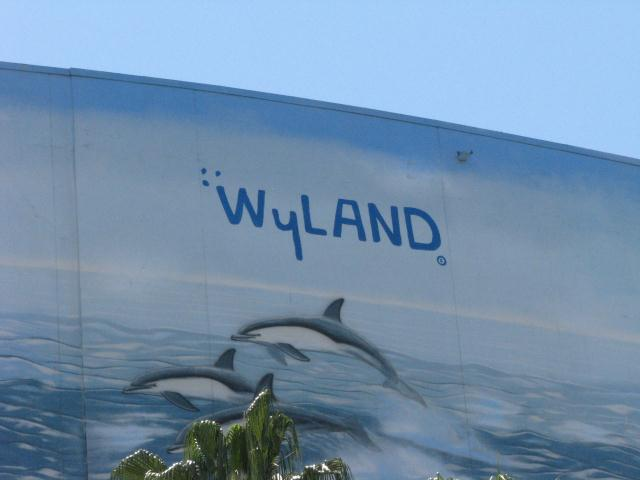
Wyland's signature on Long Beach Arena.

Along the exterior wall of the drum-shaped Arena is "Planet Ocean", one of environmental artist Wyland's Whaling Walls, which was dedicated on July 9, 1992, and covers 116,000 square feet (11,000 m^{2}). The mural depicts migratory gray whales and other aquatic life that can be found in the waters off Long Beach.

In celebration of Earth Day in 2009, Wyland touched up the existing Whaling Wall and added a large mural of the earth on the roof of the arena.

== Meeting rooms ==
There are two ballrooms: the 20,456 square foot (1900 m^{2}) Grand Ballroom (seating up to 2,100) and the 13,200 square foot (1300 m^{2}) Promenade Ballroom (seating up to 1,400) plus 34 meeting rooms totaling 82,823 square feet (7695 m^{2}).

== Recordings ==
The Long Beach Arena has been used to record part or all of several live concert albums and videos, including:

- Gerry in California, live EP by Gerry and the Pacemakers, 1965
- Billy J. Plays the States, live EP by Billy J. Kramer and the Dakotas, 1965
- Turn Around, Live Long Beach, Deep Purple, July 1971
- Closer To Queen Mary, album, The Who, December 10, 1971
- How the West Was Won album, Led Zeppelin, June 27, 1972
- Leon Live album, Leon Russell, August 28, 1972
- The Night the Light Went On in Long Beach album, Electric Light Orchestra, May, 1974
- Crossroads 2: Live in the Seventies album, Eric Clapton, July 19, 1974 & July 20, 1974
- King Biscuit Flower Hour Presents: Deep Purple in Concert album, Deep Purple, February 1976
- Boston - Live in Long Beach '77 album, Boston, December 1977
- Richard Pryor: Live in Concert, December 10, 1978
- St. Valentine's Day Rock & Roll Massacre: Hustler DVD re-issue, West Coast Sound, February 14, 1980
- Street Songs Deluxe Edition, Live CD by Rick James July 30, 1981
- Live After Death, Iron Maiden, March 15, 1985

Singer Bruce Dickinson orders the crowd several times throughout the show, "Scream for me, Long Beach!"

- Live... in the Raw album by W.A.S.P., March 10, 1987
- Psychedelic Sexfunk Live from Heaven video, Red Hot Chili Peppers, 1990
- Medusa: Dare to be Truthful TV special by Julie Brown mid-September 1991 (was also filmed at the Center Theater and Exhibition Hall)
- Rock Steady Live DVD by No Doubt 2002
- I Heard a Voice – Live from Long Beach Arena DVD by AFI December 12, 2006
- Louder Now:Partone and Louder Now:Parttwo, Taking Back Sunday live CD/DVD, 2006-2007
- Berth, The Used live CD/DVD combination, February 6, 2007
- Live in the LBC & Diamonds in the Rough, Avenged Sevenfold April 10, 2008
- Live in the LBC & Diamonds in the Rough DVD by Avenged Sevenfold 16 September 2008

== See also ==
- List of convention centers in the United States

Preceded by first arena	Home of the Los Angeles Kings; 1967	Succeeded by The Forum
