= West Coast Conference men's basketball tournament =

Annual college basketball tournament

- Conference basketball championship
- Sport: College basketball
- Conference: West Coast
- Number of teams: 10
- Format: Single-elimination tournament
- Current stadium: Orleans Arena
- Current location: Paradise, Nevada
- Played: 1987–present
- Last contest: 2026
- Current champion: Gonzaga Bulldogs
- Most championships: Gonzaga Bulldogs (23)
- TV partner(s): ESPN, ESPN2, ESPNU, ESPN+
- Official website: wccsports.com/mbball

The West Coast Conference men's basketball tournament is the annual concluding tournament for the NCAA college basketball in the West Coast Conference (WCC). The winner of the tournament each year is guaranteed a place in the NCAA Division I men's basketball tournament for that season. Through 2008, the tournament was played on a rotating basis at the home courts of member teams. The 2009 edition was the first played at a neutral site, namely Orleans Arena in Paradise, Nevada, just outside Las Vegas. The semifinals are broadcast nationally on ESPN2 and the championship is broadcast nationally on ESPN.

The tournament has used several formats in its history, though seeding in all formats has been based strictly on conference record (with tiebreakers used as needed). When the tournament began in 1987, when the conference had eight members, it used a standard single-elimination bracket that was reseeded after the first round so that the highest and lowest remaining seeds played one another in the semifinals. Beginning in 2003, the bottom four seeds played first-round games (5 vs. 8, 6 vs. 7), with the 3 and 4 seeds receiving byes to the quarterfinals and the top two seeds receiving byes to the semifinals. For the 2012 tournament, the first after the 2011 arrival of BYU in the WCC, this format was adjusted so that the 8 and 9 seeds played in the first round, with the winner joining the 5 through 7 seeds in the second round, and the top four seeds continuing to receive byes into the quarterfinals (3 and 4) or semifinals (1 and 2). In addition, reseeding was abolished, with the top seed automatically playing the winner of the quarterfinal game featuring the 4 seed and the 2 seed automatically playing the winner of the quarterfinal game featuring the 3 seed.

Beginning in 2014, the WCC adopted a new format to incorporate a tenth team (Pacific). The new format is a traditional 10-team tournament. Seeds 1-6 received a bye into the quarterfinals while 7 played 10 and 8 played 9 in the first round. The second round featured the winner of the 7/10 match playing the 2-seed while the winner of the 8/9 match played the 1 seed. The 3 seed played the 6 seed and the 4 seed played the 5 seed. In 2014, the first-round games aired on BYUtv Sports. The afternoon quarterfinal games aired on BYUtv, and the evening quarterfinals were on ESPN2. One semifinal aired on ESPN and the other on ESPN2, and the championship game was carried by ESPN.

For 2019 and beyond, the tournament returned to a format similar to that used from 2003–2011, with slight changes to the terminology used for the rounds prior to the semifinals. The 7 through 10 seeds play in what is now called the "opening round", the 5 and 6 seeds start play in the "second round", and the 3 and 4 seeds start in the "third round". The top two seeds receive byes into the semifinals. According to media reports, the major impetus for this and other changes to WCC basketball was the potential loss of Gonzaga to the Mountain West Conference after the 2017–18 season, which in the end did not happen.

== List of finals ==
Year	Champion	Score	Runner-up	Venue	City	Tournament MVP
1987	Santa Clara	77–65	Pepperdine	War Memorial Gymnasium	San Francisco, Ca	Jens Gordon, Santa Clara
1988	Loyola Marymount	104–96	Santa Clara	Toso Pavilion	Santa Clara, Ca	Hank Gathers, Loyola Marymount
1989	Loyola Marymount	75–70 (a.e.t.)	Santa Clara	War Memorial Gymnasium	San Francisco, Ca	Hank Gathers, Loyola Marymount
1990	None (Note: Tournament canceled due to the death of Hank Gathers. Having won the regular season title, Loyola Marymount was awarded the WCC's automatic bid to the NCAA tournament.)	None	None	Gersten Pavilion	Los Angeles, Ca	None
1991	Pepperdine	71–68 (a.e.t.)	Saint Mary's	Toso Pavilion	Santa Clara, Ca	Geoff Lear, Pepperdine
1992	Pepperdine	73–70	Gonzaga	Chiles Center	Portland, Or	Doug Christie, Pepperdine
1993	Santa Clara	73–63	Pepperdine	War Memorial Gymnasium	San Francisco, Ca	Steve Nash, Santa Clara
1994	Pepperdine	56–53	San Diego	Toso Pavilion	Santa Clara, Ca	Dana Jones, Pepperdine
1995	Gonzaga	80–67	Portland	Toso Pavilion	Santa Clara, Ca	John Rillie, Gonzaga
1996	Portland	76–68	Gonzaga	Toso Pavilion	Santa Clara, Ca	Kweemada King, Portland
1997	Saint Mary's	66–59	San Francisco	Gersten Pavilion	Los Angeles, Ca	Brad Millard, Saint Mary's
1998	San Francisco	80–67	Gonzaga	Toso Pavilion	Santa Clara, Ca	Hakeem Ward, San Francisco
1999	Gonzaga	91–62	Santa Clara	Toso Pavilion	Santa Clara, Ca	Matt Santangelo, Gonzaga
2000	Gonzaga	69–65 (a.e.t.)	Pepperdine	Toso Pavilion	Santa Clara, Ca	Casey Calvary, Gonzaga
2001	Gonzaga	80–77	Santa Clara	Jenny Craig Pavilion	San Diego, Ca	Dan Dickau, Gonzaga
2002	Gonzaga	96–90	Pepperdine	Jenny Craig Pavilion	San Diego, Ca	Dan Dickau, Gonzaga
2003	San Diego	72–63	Gonzaga	Jenny Craig Pavilion	San Diego, Ca	Jason Keep, San Diego
2004	Gonzaga	84–71	Saint Mary's	Leavey Center	Santa Clara, Ca	Ronny Turiaf, Gonzaga
2005	Gonzaga	80–67	Saint Mary's	Leavey Center	Santa Clara, Ca	Adam Morrison, Gonzaga
2006	Gonzaga	68–67	Loyola Marymount	McCarthey Athletic Center	Spokane, Wa	Adam Morrison, Gonzaga
2007	Gonzaga	77–68	Santa Clara	Chiles Center	Portland, Or	Derek Raivio, Gonzaga
2008	San Diego	69–62	Gonzaga	Jenny Craig Pavilion	San Diego, Ca	Brandon Johnson, San Diego
2009	Gonzaga	83–58	Saint Mary's	Orleans Arena	Paradise, Nv	Micah Downs, Gonzaga
2010	Saint Mary's	81–62	Gonzaga	Orleans Arena	Paradise, Nv	Mickey McConnell, Saint Mary's
2011	Gonzaga	75–63	Saint Mary's	Orleans Arena	Paradise, Nv	Marquise Carter, Gonzaga
2012	Saint Mary's	78–74 (a.e.t.)	Gonzaga	Orleans Arena	Paradise, Nv	Matthew Dellavedova, Saint Mary's
2013	Gonzaga	65–51	Saint Mary's	Orleans Arena	Paradise, Nv	Elias Harris, Gonzaga
2014	Gonzaga	75–64	BYU	Orleans Arena	Paradise, Nv	Sam Dower, Gonzaga
2015	Gonzaga	91–75	BYU	Orleans Arena	Paradise, Nv	Kyle Wiltjer, Gonzaga
2016	Gonzaga	85–75	Saint Mary's	Orleans Arena	Paradise, Nv	Kyle Wiltjer, Gonzaga
2017	Gonzaga	74–56	Saint Mary's	Orleans Arena	Paradise, Nv	Nigel Williams-Goss, Gonzaga
2018	Gonzaga	74–54	BYU	Orleans Arena	Paradise, Nv	Killian Tillie, Gonzaga
2019	Saint Mary's	60–47	Gonzaga	Orleans Arena	Paradise, Nv	Jordan Hunter, Saint Mary's
2020	Gonzaga	84–66	Saint Mary's	Orleans Arena	Paradise, Nv	Joël Ayayi, Gonzaga
2021	Gonzaga	88–78	BYU	Orleans Arena	Paradise, Nv	Jalen Suggs, Gonzaga
2022	Gonzaga	82–69	Saint Mary's	Orleans Arena	Paradise, Nv	Andrew Nembhard, Gonzaga
2023	Gonzaga	77–51	Saint Mary's	Orleans Arena	Paradise, Nv	Drew Timme, Gonzaga
2024	Saint Mary's	69–60	Gonzaga	Orleans Arena	Paradise, Nv	Augustas Marčiulionis, Saint Mary's
2025	Gonzaga	58–51	Saint Mary's	Orleans Arena	Paradise, Nv	Graham Ike, Gonzaga
2026	Gonzaga	79–68	Santa Clara	Orleans Arena	Paradise, Nv	Graham Ike, Gonzaga

== Results by team ==
As of March 12, 2024

=== Championship game team wins ===
School	Wins	Losses	Games	Win %	Last title	Last game
Gonzaga	23	9	32	.719	2026	2026
Saint Mary's	5	12	17	.294	2024	2025
Pepperdine	3	4	7	.429	1994	2002
Santa Clara	2	6	8	.286	1993	2026
San Diego	2	1	3	.667	2008	2008
Loyola Marymount	2	1	3	.667	1989	2006
San Francisco	1	1	2	.500	1998	1998
Portland	1	1	2	.500	1996	1996
BYU	0	4	4	.000		2021
Pacific	0	0	0	–		

=== Team win–loss records ===
School	Games	Wins	Losses	Win %	Avg. Seed	Years
Gonzaga	83	66	17	.795	2.08	38 (1987–2024)
Saint Mary's	72	39	33	.542	3.42	38 (1987–2024)
Pepperdine	71	37	34	.521	5.11	38 (1987–2024)
Santa Clara	69	33	36	.478	4.55	38 (1987–2024)
San Diego	66	31	35	.470	5.47	38 (1987–2024)
San Francisco	62	25	37	.403	4.89	38 (1987–2024)
Loyola Marymount	59	24	35	.407	6.26	38 (1987–2024)
Portland	51	15	36	.294	6.74	38 (1987–2024)
BYU	25	13	12	.520	3	12 (2012–2023)
Pacific	12	2	10	.167	2.5	10 (2014–2015; 2017–2024)

As of March 12, 2024.

=== Team head-to-head results ===
	BYU	Gonzaga	LMU	Pacific	Pepperdine	Portland	Saint Mary's	San Diego	San Francisco	Santa Clara
vs. BYU	–	6–0	0–4	0–0	0–1	0–2	3–1	2–2	1–1	0–2
vs. Gonzaga	0–6	–	2–7	0–1	3–5	1–4	4–18	5–9	1–7	1–9
vs. LMU	4–0	7–2	–	0–1	5–3	3–7	3–1	3–2	6–3	4–5
vs. Pacific	0–0	1–0	1–0	–	2–2	0–0	0–0	0–0	4–0	2–0
vs. Pepperdine	1–0	5–3	3–5	2–2	–	2–5	7–4	9–5	1–8	4–5
vs. Portland	2–0	4–1	7–3	0–0	5–2	–	5–1	3–5	4–1	6–2
vs. Saint Mary's	1–3	18–4	1–3	0–0	4–7	1–5	–	1–5	1–4	6–8
vs. San Diego	2–2	9–5	2–3	0–0	5–9	5–3	5–1	–	4–6	3–2
vs. San Francisco	1–1	7–1	3–6	0–4	8–1	1–4	4–1	6–4	–	7–3
vs. Santa Clara	2–0	9–1	5–4	0–2	5–4	2–6	8–6	2–3	3–7	–
Total	13–12	66–17	24–35	2–10	37–34	15–36	39–33	31–35	25–37	33–36

=== Championship game team head-to-head results ===
	BYU	Gonzaga	LMU	Pacific	Pepperdine	Portland	Saint Mary's	San Diego	San Francisco	Santa Clara
vs. BYU	–	4–0	0–0	0–0	0–0	0–0	0–0	0–0	0–0	0–0
vs. Gonzaga	0–4	–	0–1	0–0	1–2	1–1	4–10	2–0	1–0	0–3
vs. LMU	0–0	1–0	–	0–0	0–0	0–0	0–0	0–0	0–0	0–2
vs. Pacific	0–0	0–0	0–0	–	0–0	0–0	0–0	0–0	0–0	0–0
vs. Pepperdine	0–0	2–1	0–0	0–0	–	0–0	0–1	0–1	0–0	2–0
vs. Portland	0–0	1–1	0–0	0–0	0–0	–	0–0	0–0	0–0	0–0
vs. Saint Mary's	0–0	10–4	0–0	0–0	1–0	0–0	–	0–0	0–1	0–0
vs. San Diego	0–0	0–2	0–0	0–0	1–0	0–0	0–0	–	0–0	0–0
vs. San Francisco	0–0	0–1	0–0	0–0	0–0	0–0	1–0	0–0	–	0–0
vs. Santa Clara	0–0	3–0	2–0	0–0	0–2	0–0	0–0	0–0	0–0	–
Total	0–4	21–9	2–1	0–0	3–4	1–1	5–11	2–1	1–1	2–5

== Results by seed ==
As of March 12, 2024

=== Seed win–loss records ===
Seed	Games	Wins	Losses	Win %
1	86	69	17	.802
2	80	53	27	.663
3	75	41	34	.547
4	65	29	36	.446
5	69	34	35	.493
6	57	19	38	.333
7	54	16	38	.296
8	54	16	38	.296
9	18	5	13	.278
10	12	3	9	.250

=== Championship game seed win–loss records ===
Seed	Games	Wins	Losses	Win %	Last title	Last game
1	31	20	11	.645	2024	2024
2	25	10	15	.400	2023	2024
3	8	3	5	.375	2008	2020
4	5	1	4	.200	1995	1999
5	4	3	1	.750	1998	1998
6	0	0	0	–		
7	1	0	1	.000		1987
8	0	0	0	–		
9	0	0	0	–		
10	0	0	0	–		

== Results by coach ==
As of March 12, 2024

=== Coach win–loss records ===
Current WCC coaches
Coach	School	Games	Wins	Losses	Win pct	Years
Mark Few	Gonzaga	58	52	6	.897	25 (2000–2024)
Randy Bennett	Saint Mary's	48	29	19	.604	23 (2002–2024)
Herb Sendek	Santa Clara	14	6	8	.429	8 (2017–2024)
Shantay Legans	Portland	6	3	3	.500	3 (2022–2024)
Stan Johnson	Loyola Marymount	6	2	4	.333	4 (2021–2024)
Chris Gerlufsen	San Francisco	5	3	2	.600	2 (2023–2024)
Steve Lavin	San Diego	3	1	2	.333	3 (2023–2024)
Wayne Tinkle	Oregon State	0	0	0	–	
Dave Smart	Pacific	0	0	0	–	
Ed Schilling	Pepperdine	0	0	0	–	
David Riley	Washington State	0	0	0	–	

Former WCC coaches
Coach	School	Games	Wins	Losses	Win pct	Years
Tom Asbury	Pepperdine	20	15	5	.750	9 (1989–1994; 2009–2011)
Dick Davey	Santa Clara	28	14	14	.500	15 (1993–2007)
Brad Holland	San Diego	25	13	12	.520	13 (1995–2007)
Dan Fitzgerald	Gonzaga	19	9	10	.474	11 (1987–1997)
Dave Rose	BYU	17	9	8	.529	8 (2012–2019)
Bill Grier	San Diego	15	8	7	.533	8 (2008–2015)
Carroll Williams	Santa Clara	13	8	5	.615	6 (1987–1992)
Lorenzo Romar	Pepperdine	16	7	9	.438	9 (1997–1999; 2019–2024)
Max Good	Loyola Marymount	13	7	6	.538	6 (2009–2014)
Paul Westhead	Loyola Marymount	8	7	1	.875	4 (1987–1990)
Philip Mathews	San Francisco	14	6	8	.429	9 (1996–2004)
Eric Reveno	Portland	15	5	10	.333	10 (2007–2016)
Kerry Keating	Santa Clara	14	5	9	.357	9 (2008–2016)
Rex Walters	San Francisco	13	5	8	.385	8 (2009–2016)
Hank Egan	San Diego	12	5	7	.417	8 (1987–1994)
Rob Chavez	Portland	11	5	6	.455	7 (1995–2001)
Dan Monson	Gonzaga	6	5	1	.833	2 (1998–1999)
Jim Brovelli	San Francisco	13	4	9	.308	9 (1987–1995)
Marty Wilson	Pepperdine	12	4	8	.333	8 (1996; 2012–2018)
Ernie Kent	Saint Mary's	9	4	5	.444	6 (1992–1997)
Paul Westphal	Pepperdine	9	4	5	.444	5 (2002–2006)
Sam Scholl	San Diego	8	4	4	.500	4 (2019–2022)
Mark Pope	BYU	8	4	4	.500	8 (2020–2023)
Todd Golden	San Francisco	7	4	3	.571	3 (2020–2022)
Mike Dunlap	Loyola Marymount	9	3	6	.333	6 (2015–2020)
Lynn Nance	Saint Mary's	6	3	3	.500	3 (1987–1989)
Jim Harrick	Pepperdine	5	3	2	.600	2 (1987–1988)
Jan van Breda Kolff	Pepperdine	5	3	2	.600	2 (2000–2001)
John Olive	Loyola Marymount	7	2	5	.286	5 (1993–1997)
Steve Aggers	Loyola Marymount	7	2	5	.286	5 (2001–2005)
Dave Fehte	Saint Mary's	3	2	1	.667	1 (1991)
Larry Steele	Portland	7	1	6	.143	7 (1988–1994)
Damon Stoudamire	Pacific	6	1	5	.167	5 (2017–2021)
Dave Bollwinkel	Saint Mary's	5	1	4	.200	4 (1998–2001)
Terry Porter	Portland	5	1	4	.200	4 (2017–2020)
Jessie Evans	San Francisco	4	1	3	.250	3 (2005–2007)
Rodney Tention	Loyola Marymount	4	1	3	.250	3 (2006–2008)
Kyle Smith	San Francisco	4	1	3	.250	3 (2017–2019)
Eric Bridgeland	Pepperdine	2	1	1	.500	1 (2008)
Eddie Sutton	San Francisco	2	1	1	.500	1 (2008)
Michael Holton	Portland	5	0	5	.000	5 (2002–2006)
Charles Bradley	Loyola Marymount	3	0	3	.000	3 (1998–2000)
Lamont Smith	San Diego	3	0	3	.000	3 (2016–2018)
Jay Hillock	Loyola Marymount	2	0	2	.000	2 (1991–1992)
Ron Verlin	Pacific	2	0	2	.000	2 (2014–2015)
Jack Avina	Portland	1	0	1	.000	1 (1987)
Paul Landreaux	Saint Mary's	1	0	1	.000	1 (1990)
Tony Fuller	Pepperdine	1	0	1	.000	1 (1995)
Vance Walberg	Pepperdine	1	0	1	.000	1 (2007)
Ben Johnson	Portland	1	0	1	.000	1 (2021)
Josh Newman	Pacific	1	0	1	.000	1 (2024)

=== Championship game coach win–loss records ===
Current WCC Coaches
Coach	School	Games	Wins	Losses	Win Pct	Last title	Last Game
Mark Few	Gonzaga	25	19	6	.760	2023	2024
Randy Bennett	Saint Mary's	14	4	10	.286	2024	2024

Former WCC Coaches
Coach	School	Games	Wins	Losses	Win Pct	Last title	Last Game
Tom Asbury	Pepperdine	4	3	1	.750	1994	1994
Paul Westhead	Loyola Marymount	2	2	0	1.000	1989	1989
Dick Davey	Santa Clara	4	1	3	.250	1993	2007
Dan Fitzgerald	Gonzaga	3	1	2	.333	1995	1996
Carroll Williams	Santa Clara	3	1	2	.333	1987	1989
Rob Chavez	Portland	2	1	1	.500	1996	1996
Philip Mathews	San Francisco	2	1	1	.500	1998	1998
Dan Monson	Gonzaga	2	1	1	.500	1999	1999
Ernie Kent	Saint Mary's	1	1	0	1.000	1997	1997
Brad Holland	San Diego	1	1	0	1.000	2003	2003
Bill Grier	San Diego	1	1	0	1.000	2008	2008
Dave Rose	BYU	3	0	3	.000		2018
Jim Harrick	Pepperdine	1	0	1	.000		1987
Dave Fehte	Saint Mary's	1	0	1	.000		1991
Hank Egan	San Diego	1	0	1	.000		1994
Jan van Breda Kolff	Pepperdine	1	0	1	.000		2000
Paul Westphal	Pepperdine	1	0	1	.000		2002
Rodney Tention	Loyola Marymount	1	0	1	.000		2006
Mark Pope	BYU	1	0	1	.000		2021

== WCC Tournament Rivalries ==
=== Gonzaga–Saint Mary's men's basketball rivalry ===
The Gonzaga–Saint Mary's men's basketball rivalry is an intra-West Coast Conference college basketball rivalry between the Saint Mary's Gaels men's basketball team of Saint Mary's College of California in Moraga, California and the Gonzaga Bulldogs men's basketball team of Gonzaga University in Spokane, Washington. Many analysts and members of the media have touted the Gaels vs. Zags as one of the best, if not the best, college basketball rivalry on the West Coast, as both teams have been consistently two of the top three teams in the conference over the last 2 decades. Gonzaga and Saint Mary's have combined to win 26 out of the last 30 conference championship games, including each of the last 16. The two teams have met a total of 116 times dating back to 1955 and currently meet biannually as a part of WCC conference play, with the potential to play a third game in the WCC tournament and a fourth in the postseason. As of March 2022, they have met 20 times in the WCC Tournament but have never met in any postseason tournaments beyond the end of conference play. Saint Mary's has upset a number 1 ranked Zags squad twice – once in the 2019 WCC final as an unranked team and once in 2022 as #23 in Moraga. And in 2024 took down the Zags in the WCC Championship game by the score 69-60.

== Broadcasters ==
=== Television ===
Year	Network	Play-by-play	Analyst	Sideline
2024	ESPN	Dave Flemming	Sean Farnham	
2023	ESPN	Dave Flemming	Sean Farnham	
2022	ESPN	Dave Flemming	Sean Farnham	Molly McGrath
2021	ESPN	Dave Flemming	Sean Farnham	
2020	ESPN	Bob Wischusen	Dick Vitale	Sean Farnham
2019	ESPN	Bob Wischusen	Dick Vitale	Sean Farnham
2018	ESPN	Bob Wischusen	Dick Vitale	Gene Wojciechowski
2017	ESPN	Dave O'Brien	Dick Vitale	Jeff Goodman
2016	ESPN	Brent Musburger	Dick Vitale and Fran Fraschilla	
2015	ESPN	Dave Pasch	Sean Farnham	Jeff Goodman
2014	ESPN	Dave Flemming	Sean Farnham	
2013	ESPN	Dave Flemming	Sean Farnham	
2012	ESPN	Dave Flemming	Sean Farnham	
2011	ESPN	Dave Flemming	Sean Farnham	
2010	ESPN	Terry Gannon	Stephen Bardo	
2009	ESPN2	Terry Gannon	Stephen Bardo and Steve Lavin	
2008	ESPN	Terry Gannon	Stephen Bardo	
2007	ESPN	Dave O'Brien	Rick Majerus	
2006	ESPN	Dave Pasch	Rick Majerus	
2005	ESPN	Terry Gannon	Jimmy Dykes	
2004	ESPN			
2003	ESPN			
2002	ESPN	Chris Marlowe	Ann Meyers	
2001	ESPN	Chris Marlowe	Reggie Theus	
2000	ESPN			
1999	ESPN			
1998	ESPN			
1997	ESPN			
1996	ESPN			
1995	ESPN			
1994	ESPN			
1993	ESPN	Steve Physioc	Kareem Abdul-Jabbar	
1992	ESPN			
1991	ESPN	Barry Tompkins	Quinn Buckner	
1990	ESPN	Canceled		
1989	ESPN	Roger Twibell	Dan Belluomini	
1988	ESPN	Ted Robinson	Dan Belluomini	

- As previously mentioned, the 1990 tournament final was canceled following the on-court death of Loyola Marymount player Hank Gathers during the Lions' semifinal game against Portland. LMU was given the league's automatic bid to that year's NCAA tournament by virtue of its regular-season league championship

=== Radio ===
Year	Network	Play-by-play	Analyst
2022	Westwood One	Ryan Radtke	Doug Gottlieb
2022	Westwood One	Ryan Radtke	Doug Gottlieb
2021	Westwood One	Ryan Radtke	Dan Dickau
2020	Westwood One	Spero Dedes	Austin Croshere
2019	Westwood One	Ryan Radtke	Mike Montgomery
2018	Westwood One	Ryan Radtke	Mike Montgomery
2017	Westwood One	Ryan Radtke	Mike Montgomery
2016	Westwood One	Kevin Calabro	P. J. Carlesimo
2015	Westwood One	Kevin Calabro	Bill Frieder
2014	Westwood One	Dave Ryan	Bill Frieder
2013	Dial Global Sports	Ted Robinson	Steve Lappas
2012	Dial Global Sports	Kevin Calabro	Steve Lappas
2011	Westwood One	Ted Robinson	Steve Lappas
2010	Westwood One	Ted Robinson	P. J. Carlesimo
2009	Westwood One	Dave Sims	P. J. Carlesimo

== See also ==
- West Coast Conference women's basketball tournament
