= Terrell Lowery =

American baseball player (born 1970)

- Outfielder
- Born: October 25, 1970 (age 55); Oakland, California, U.S.
- Batted: Right Threw: Right

MLB debut
- September 13, 1997, for the Chicago Cubs

Last MLB appearance
- October 1, 2000, for the San Francisco Giants

MLB statistics
- Batting average: .282
- Home runs: 3
- Runs batted in: 23
- Stats at Baseball Reference

Teams
- Chicago Cubs (1997–1998); Tampa Bay Devil Rays (1999); San Francisco Giants (2000)

Quenton Terrell Lowery (born October 25, 1970) is an American former professional baseball player for the Chicago Cubs, Tampa Bay Devil Rays, and San Francisco Giants. He played college basketball for the Loyola Marymount Lions, earning honorable mention as an All-American in 1992.

== High school ==
Lowery attended Oakland Technical High School, graduating with a 25-points per game average in basketball and numerous all-area and all-state awards.

== College ==
During his college basketball career with the Loyola Marymount Lions, Lowery appeared in an Elite Eight game, losing to UNLV. He was a teammate of Bo Kimble. Lowery fed the alley-oop to Hank Gathers moments before Gathers' collapsed against Portland in the 1990 West Coast Conference tournament and eventually died.

In 1990–91, Lowery was the Lions' point guard with starter Tony Walker out for the year recovering from a broken wrist. Lowery ranked fifth in the nation in scoring, averaging 28.5 points per game, and was third in assists with 9.1 per game. He became the first player in NCAA history to rank in the top five in both scoring and assists averages in the same season. As a senior in 1991–92, Lowery moved back to shooting guard, as Walker returned, and he averaged 26 points and was the country's eighth-leading scorer. He earned honorable mention from the Associated Press for their All-American team. He finished his career as the WCC’s all-time leader in assists with 689 and ranked second in career scoring with 2,201 points.

== Personal life ==
Terrell is currently married to Denise, and they have three children.

== See also ==
- 1992 NCAA Men's Basketball All-Americans
