= 1989–90 Gonzaga Bulldogs men's basketball team =

American college basketball season

1989–90 Gonzaga Bulldogs men's basketball
- Conference: West Coast Conference
- Record: 8–20 (3–11 WCC)
- Head coach: Dan Fitzgerald (8th season)
- Assistant coaches: Dan Monson; Mark Few (GA)
- Home arena: Martin Centre

1989–90 West Coast Conference men's basketball standings
	Conf.				Overall
Team	W		L	PCT	W		L	PCT
No. 21 Loyola Marymount	13	–	1	.929	26	–	6	.813
Pepperdine	10	–	4	.714	17	–	11	.607
San Diego	9	–	5	.643	16	–	12	.571
Portland	7	–	7	.500	11	–	17	.393
Santa Clara	6	–	8	.429	9	–	19	.321
San Francisco	4	–	10	.286	8	–	20	.286
Saint Mary's	4	–	10	.286	7	–	20	.259
Gonzaga	3	–	11	.214	8	–	20	.286
Rankings from AP poll

The 1989–90 Gonzaga Bulldogs men's basketball team represented Gonzaga University in the West Coast Conference (WCC) during the 1989–90 NCAA Division I men's basketball season. Led by eighth-year head coach Dan Fitzgerald, the Bulldogs were 8–19 (.296) overall in the regular season (3–11 in WCC, last), and played their home games on campus at the Charlotte Y. Martin Centre (formerly known as Kennedy Pavilion) in Spokane, Washington.

At the fourth conference tournament, the Zags lost again in the quarterfinals, to top seed Loyola Marymount, to finish at 8–20 (.286). Their first tournament wins came two years later in 1992; they advanced to the final, but fell by three to top-seeded Pepperdine.

== Postseason results ==
Date time, TV	Rank^{#}	Opponent^{#}	Result	Record	Site (attendance) city, state
WCC tournament
Sat, March 3	(8)	at (1) No. 22; Loyola Marymount; Quarterfinal	L 84–121	8–20	Gersten Pavilion; Los Angeles, California
*Non-conference game. ^{#}Rankings from AP poll. (#) Tournament seedings in parentheses. All times are in Pacific time.
