= 1987–88 Loyola Marymount Lions men's basketball team =

American college basketball season

1987–88 Loyola Marymount Lions men's basketball

WCAC Regular Season Champions WCAC tournament champions

NCAA tournament, second round
- Conference: West Coast Conference

Ranking
- Coaches: No. 14
- AP: No. 15
- Record: 28–4 (14–0 WCAC)
- Head coach: Paul Westhead (3rd season)
- Assistant coaches: Jay Hillock (3rd season); Judas Prada; Bruce Woods
- Home arena: Gersten Pavilion

1987–88 West Coast Athletic Conference men's basketball standings
	Conf.				Overall
Team	W		L	PCT	W		L	PCT
No. 15 Loyola Marymount †	14	–	0	1.000	28	–	4	.875
Saint Mary's	9	–	5	.643	19	–	9	.679
Santa Clara	9	–	5	.643	20	–	11	.645
Pepperdine	8	–	6	.571	17	–	13	.567
Gonzaga	7	–	7	.500	16	–	12	.571
San Francisco	5	–	9	.357	13	–	15	.464
San Diego	3	–	11	.214	11	–	17	.393
Portland	1	–	13	.071	6	–	22	.214
† Conference tournament winner Rankings from AP poll

The 1987–88 Loyola Marymount Lions men's basketball team represented Loyola Marymount University during the 1987–88 NCAA Division I men's basketball season. The Lions were led by third-year head coach Paul Westhead. They played their home games at Gersten Pavilion in Los Angeles, California as members of the West Coast Conference.

LMU led the nation in scoring by averaging 110.3 points per game, and won a school-record 25 consecutive games before losing to North Carolina in the second round of the NCAA tournament.

== Roster ==
1987–88 Loyola Marymount Lions men's basketball team
Players
Coaches

Pos.	#	Name	Height	Weight	Year	Previous school	Hometown
C	00	Marcellus Lee	6 ft 10 in (2.08 m)	230 lb (104 kg)	So		Pomona, CA
F	5	Mark Armstrong (C)	6 ft 6 in (1.98 m)	—	Sr		Riverside, CA
G	11	Corey Gaines	6 ft 3 in (1.91 m)	195 lb (88 kg)	Sr	Saint Bernard HS/UCLA	Playa del Ray, CA
G	12	Tony Walker	6 ft 1 in (1.85 m)	—	Fr		Riverside, CA
F	20	Mike Yoest	6 ft 7 in (2.01 m)	—	Sr	Crespi Carmelite HS	Encino, CA
G	21	Jeff Fryer	6 ft 2 in (1.88 m)	180 lb (82 kg)	So	Corona del Mar HS	Newport Beach, CA
F	23	Jeff Roscoe	6 ft 9 in (2.06 m)	210 lb (95 kg)	So		Puyallup, WA
G	30	Bo Kimble	6 ft 4 in (1.93 m)	190 lb (86 kg)	So	Dobbins Technical HS/USC	Philadelphia, PA
G	32	Enoch Simmons	6 ft 4 in (1.93 m)	205 lb (93 kg)	Jr
F	44	Hank Gathers	6 ft 7 in (2.01 m)	210 lb (95 kg)	So	Dobbins Technical HS/USC	Philadelphia, PA
F	50	Marcus Slater	6 ft 8 in (2.03 m)	190 lb (86 kg)	Fr		Carson, CA

Head coach

- Paul Westhead (Saint Joseph's)

Assistant coach(es)

- Jay Hillock (Gonzaga)
- Judas Prada
- Bruce Woods
- Jim Ellis

Legend

- (C) Team captain
- (S) Suspended
- (I) Ineligible
- (W) Walk-on
- Injured
- Current redshirt

Roster

== Schedule and results ==
Date time, TV	Rank^{#}	Opponent^{#}	Result	Record	High points	High rebounds	High assists	Site (attendance) city, state
Non-conference regular season
Nov 28, 1987*		vs. Tennessee Tech; Lapchick Tournament	W 114–78	1–0	–	–	–	Alumni Hall (6,008); Queens, New York
Nov 29, 1987*		at St. John's; Lapchick Tournament	L 85–88	1–1	–	–	–	Alumni Hall (6,008); Queens, New York
Dec 2, 1987*		Westmont College	W 100–84	2–1	–	–	–	Gersten Pavilion (1,250); Los Angeles, California
Dec 5, 1987*		Pacific	W 130–103	3–1	–	–	14 – Gaines	Gersten Pavilion (1,445); Los Angeles, California
Dec 9, 1987*		at Oregon State	L 69–84	3–2	23 – Gathers	9 – Armstrong	2 – Gaines	Gill Coliseum (5,210); Corvallis, OR
Dec 13, 1987*		at Long Beach State	L 113–117 ^{OT}	3–3	39 – Gathers	12 – Gathers	12 – Gaines	Gold Mine (1,727); Long Beach, CA
Dec 18, 1987*		So. California College	W 140–106	4–3	–	–	–	Gersten Pavilion (1,125); Los Angeles, California
Dec 23, 1987*		Brooklyn College	W 123–72	5–3	–	–	–	Gersten Pavilion (1,025); Los Angeles, California
Dec 28, 1987*		Loyola-Chicago	W 99–89	6–3	–	–	–	Gersten Pavilion (2,760); Los Angeles, California
Dec 30, 1987*		Holy Cross	W 127–104	7–3	–	–	–	Gersten Pavilion (2,253); Los Angeles, California
Jan 4, 1988*		at Wisconsin-Green Bay	W 70–67	8–3	–	–	–	Brown County Arena (5,235); Ashwaubenon, Wisconsin
Jan 6, 1988*		at Marquette	W 102–98	9–3	–	–	–	MECCA Arena (9,817); Milwaukee, Wisconsin
Jan 9, 1988*		Azusa Pacific	W 113–89	10–3	–	–	–	Gersten Pavilion (1,875); Los Angeles, California
WCC regular season
Jan 15, 1988		San Diego	W 115–75	11–3 (1–0)	–	–	–	Gersten Pavilion (3,150); Los Angeles, California
Jan 16, 1988		Saint Mary's	W 98–81	12–3 (2–0)	–	–	–	Gersten Pavilion (3,780); Los Angeles, California
Jan 21, 1988		at Portland	W 134–106	13–3 (3–0)	–	–	–	Chiles Center (1,024); Portland, Oregon
Jan 23, 1988		at Gonzaga	W 85–72	14–3 (4–0)	–	–	–	The Kennel (4,000); Spokane, Washington
Jan 29, 1988		Gonzaga	W 116–100	15–3 (5–0)	–	–	–	Gersten Pavilion (3,575); Los Angeles, California
Jan 30, 1988		Portland	W 112–109	16–3 (6–0)	–	–	–	Gersten Pavilion (2,880); Los Angeles, California
Feb 5, 1988		at San Francisco	W 128–111	17–3 (7–0)	–	–	–	War Memorial Gymnasium (4,280); San Francisco, California
Feb 6, 1988		at Santa Clara	W 94–93	18–3 (8–0)	–	–	–	Leavey Center (5,000); Santa Clara, California
Feb 12, 1988		Santa Clara	W 108–89	19–3 (9–0)	–	–	–	Gersten Pavilion (4,156); Los Angeles, California
Feb 13, 1988		San Francisco	W 118–109	20–3 (10–0)	–	–	–	Gersten Pavilion (3,875); Los Angeles, California
Feb 17, 1988	No. 20	at Pepperdine	W 107–95	21–3 (11–0)	–	–	–	Firestone Fieldhouse (3,318); Malibu, California
Feb 20, 1988	No. 20	Pepperdine	W 142–127	22–3 (12–0)	–	–	–	Gersten Pavilion (4,525); Los Angeles, California
Feb 25, 1988	No. 19	at Saint Mary's	W 96–94	23–3 (13–0)	–	–	–	McKeon Pavilion (3,500); Moraga, California
Feb 27, 1988	No. 19	at San Diego	W 141–126	24–3 (14–0)	–	–	–	USD Sports Center (2,500); San Diego, California
WCC Tournament
Mar 5, 1988*	No. 18	vs. Portland; WCC Tournament Quarterfinal	W 110–104	25–3	33 – Gathers	18 – Gathers	8 – Gaines	Leavey Center (5,000); Santa Clara, CA
Mar 6, 1988*	No. 18	vs. Pepperdine; WCC Tournament Semifinal	W 109–106	26–3	24 – Kimble	13 – Armstrong, Gathers	8 – Gaines	Leavey Center (5,000); Santa Clara, CA
Mar 7, 1988*	No. 18	vs. Santa Clara; WCC tournament championship Game	W 104–96	27–3	24 – Gathers	12 – Armstrong	12 – Gaines	Leavey Center (5,000); Santa Clara, CA
NCAA Tournament
Mar 17, 1988*; CBS	(W10) No. 15	vs. (W7) No. 13 Wyoming; West Regional First Round	W 119–115	28–3	29 – Kimble	12 – Gathers	10 – Gaines	Jon M. Huntsman Center (14,062); Salt Lake City, UT
Mar 19, 1988*; CBS	(W10) No. 15	vs. (W2) No. 7 North Carolina; West Regional Second Round	L 97–123	28–4	27 – Fryer	12 – Gathers, Yoest	10 – Gaines	Jon M. Huntsman Center (14,062); Salt Lake City, UT
*Non-conference game. ^{#}Rankings from AP Poll. (#) Tournament seedings in parentheses.

== Awards ==
WCC Coach of the Year

- Paul Westhead

WCC tournament MVP

- Hank Gathers
