= 1990 West Coast Conference men's basketball tournament =

- Classification: Division I
- Season: 1989–90
- Teams: 8
- Site: Gersten Pavilion; Los Angeles, California
- Champions: Loyola Marymount (awarded title) (3rd title)
- Winning coach: Paul Westhead (3rd title)

1989–90 West Coast Conference men's basketball standings
	Conf.				Overall
Team	W		L	PCT	W		L	PCT
No. 21 Loyola Marymount	13	–	1	.929	26	–	6	.813
Pepperdine	10	–	4	.714	17	–	11	.607
San Diego	9	–	5	.643	16	–	12	.571
Portland	7	–	7	.500	11	–	17	.393
Santa Clara	6	–	8	.429	9	–	19	.321
San Francisco	4	–	10	.286	8	–	20	.286
Saint Mary's	4	–	10	.286	7	–	20	.259
Gonzaga	3	–	11	.214	8	–	20	.286
Rankings from AP poll

The 1990 West Coast Conference men's basketball tournament was held March 3 and 4 at the Gersten Pavilion at Loyola Marymount University in Los Angeles, California. This was the fourth edition of the tournament.

During the first semi-final game on Sunday between top-seeded Loyola Marymount and #4 seed Portland, LMU forward Hank Gathers collapsed with 13:34 left in the first half. He had just scored a dunk on an alley-oop pass from point guard Terrell Lowery that put the Lions up 25–13. He fell a short distance from Pilots point guard Erik Spoelstra, attempted to get up, but shortly after stopped breathing. Transferred to nearby Daniel Freeman Marina Hospital, Gathers was pronounced dead less than two hours later; he was 23 years old.

The game and the rest of the tournament were canceled, with regular season champion LMU awarded the WCC's berth in the 64-team NCAA tournament. Seeded eleventh in the West regional, the Lions won three games and advanced to the Elite Eight; they lost to top seed UNLV, the eventual national champion.

== Bracket ==
Quarterfinals; Saturday, March 3
1	#22 Loyola Marymount	121
8	Gonzaga	84
5	Santa Clara	62
4	Portland	65
3	San Diego	80
6	San Francisco	74
7	Saint Mary's	83
2	Pepperdine	94

Semifinals; Sunday, March 4
1	#22 Loyola Marymount	(cancelled)
4	Portland
3	San Diego	(cancelled)
2	Pepperdine

Championship; Monday, March 5
(cancelled)
