= Paul Westhead =

American basketball coach (born 1939)

Personal information
- Born: February 21, 1939 (age 87) Philadelphia, Pennsylvania, U.S.
- Listed height: 6 ft 2 in (1.88 m)

Career information
- High school: West Catholic Preparatory (Philadelphia, Pennsylvania)
- College: Saint Joseph's (1958–1961)
- NBA draft: 1961: undrafted
- Position: Guard
- Coaching career: 1970–2014

Career history

Coaching
- 1970–1979: La Salle (men's)
- 1979: Los Angeles Lakers (assistant)
- 1979–1981: Los Angeles Lakers
- 1982–1983: Chicago Bulls
- 1985–1990: Loyola Marymount (men's)
- 1990–1992: Denver Nuggets
- 1993–1997: George Mason (men's)
- 1997–1999: Golden State Warriors (assistant)
- 2000–2001: Los Angeles Stars
- 2001–2003: Panasonic Super Kangaroos
- 2003: Long Beach Jam
- 2003–2005: Orlando Magic (assistant)
- 2006–2007: Phoenix Mercury
- 2007–2009: Seattle SuperSonics / Oklahoma City Thunder (assistant)
- 2009–2014: Oregon (women's)

Career highlights
- As head coach: NBA champion (1980); WNBA champion (2007); Chuck Daly Lifetime Achievement Award (2026); MAC regular season champion (1974); 2× ECC regular season champion (1975, 1978); 2× ECC tournament champion (1975, 1978); 2× WCC regular season champion (1988, 1990); 2× WCC tournament champion (1988, 1989); 2× WCC Coach of the Year (1988, 1990)

Career coaching record
- NBA: 183–224 (.450)
- WNBA: 41–27 (.603)
- College (men's): 285–223 (.561)
- College (women's): 66–92 (.418)
- Record at Basketball Reference

Paul William Westhead (born February 21, 1939) is an American former basketball coach. He was the head coach for three National Basketball Association (NBA) teams and an assistant for four others, and also coached in the National Collegiate Athletic Association (NCAA), Women's National Basketball Association (WNBA), American Basketball Association (ABA), and Japan Basketball League (JBL). In his first year as an NBA head coach, he led a rookie Magic Johnson and the Los Angeles Lakers to the 1980 NBA Finals, which they won in six games for the team's first title in eight years. Westhead won titles in both the NBA and WNBA, and he is also remembered as the coach of the Loyola Marymount University (LMU) men's basketball team. Westhead is known for an unorthodox, run-and-gun style called "The System." He was nicknamed "The Professor" due to his former career as an English teacher prior to coaching and his tendency to quote Shakespeare and other literary sources while coaching. He attended Saint Joseph's University.

== 1960s and 1970s ==
=== St. Joseph's ===
Westhead's first assistant coaching role was at St. Joseph's under head coach Jack McKinney, who became an assistant at the school during Westhead's senior year.

=== Cheltenham High School ===
Westhead started his coaching career at Cheltenham High School in suburban Philadelphia; in 1968, he coached the Panthers to a loss in the Pennsylvania state championship. One of his players at Cheltenham was future University of Virginia Athletic Director Craig Littlepage.

=== La Salle University ===
Westhead coached the La Salle University men's basketball team starting in 1970 while also teaching as a professor in the English department. Westhead led the Explorers to one NIT and two NCAA tournament appearances in nine seasons (1970–1979). He finished with a record of 142–105.

== 1980s ==
=== Los Angeles Lakers ===
Westhead started his NBA head coaching career by succeeding McKinney as coach of the Los Angeles Lakers after serving briefly as his assistant (Westhead initially became interim head coach after McKinney was hospitalized due to a serious bicycle accident). With rookie guard Magic Johnson and longtime star Kareem Abdul-Jabbar, the Lakers won the 1980 NBA Finals in Westhead's first year as coach, defeating Philadelphia in six games for the first title in their Showtime era. However, the team lost in the playoffs the next year to the Moses Malone-led Houston Rockets. Tensions grew between Westhead and Magic Johnson, as Johnson wanted Westhead to implement a fast-break offense involving all five players that better suited his style of play, while Westhead was insistent to continue running an isolation style offense centered on Kareem Abdul-Jabbar. Westhead was fired early in his third season with the Lakers, and replaced with Pat Riley (whom Westhead had hired as an assistant). It is commonly believed that Magic Johnson orchestrated Westhead's ouster. A 1987 book called Winnin' Times (about the Lakers' franchise history) indicated that Lakers owner Jerry Buss wanted to fire Westhead several days prior to the actual occurrence, which is not mutually exclusive of the notion that Johnson had orchestrated it. In 1982, Buss said, "The irony, which makes what Magic did unfortunate, is that I had already decided to fire him. But I don't think anyone will ever totally believe that." Westhead finished his Lakers stint with a 111–50 record.

=== Chicago Bulls ===
Westhead was the head coach of the Chicago Bulls for the 1982–83 season, but lasted only one season as the Bulls went 28–54. Prior to that season, the Bulls traded all-star center Artis Gilmore to the San Antonio Spurs, and the franchise was still two years away from the debut of Michael Jordan.

=== Loyola Marymount ===
Westhead returned to the college ranks, and took over as the head coach of the Loyola Marymount Lions men's basketball program. From 1985 to 1990, Westhead oversaw an impressive run in which Loyola Marymount, despite being a smaller school and not a traditional NCAA basketball power, became a legitimate contender in NCAA hoops. Westhead lured star players like Hank Gathers and Bo Kimble, who both transferred from USC, and Loyola Marymount set several NCAA records with their up-tempo, run-and-gun style.

From 1988 to 1990, Westhead's teams went 27–3, 20–10 and 23–5 respectively, earning NCAA tournament berths each year. Gathers led the NCAA in scoring and rebounding (32.7 ppg, 13.7 rpg) in 1989 and Kimble led the NCAA in scoring in 1990 (35.3 ppg). After the on-court death of Gathers in its conference tournament, LMU went on an inspired run in the NCAA tournament in 1990 that captured the attention of the entire college basketball world for those weeks. The Lions blew out defending champion Michigan in the 2nd round and made it to the Regional Final round before losing to eventual national champion, the UNLV Runnin' Rebels, by 30 points.

Westhead's teams led Division I in scoring in 1988 (110.3 points per game), 1989 (112.5), and 1990 (122.4). LMU's 122.4 point per game in 1990 remains the NCAA record as of 2023. As of April 2012, Loyola Marymount held the five highest combined score games in Division I history. Four of the five occurred during Westhead's career, including a record 331 in the 181–150 win over United States International University on January 31, 1989.

== 1990s ==
=== Denver Nuggets ===
After the 1989–1990 season, Westhead left LMU for the NBA's Denver Nuggets, a position he held for two seasons. His tenure in Denver was best known for attempting to incorporate the run-and-gun offense that worked for LMU to the NBA.

However, while the 1990–91 Nuggets averaged a league-best 119.9 points per game in 1990–91, they also surrendered an NBA record 130.8 points per game. Their opponents never scored fewer than 100 points in any game, and only four opponents failed to score at least 110 points. They gave up 107 points in a single half to the Phoenix Suns, which remains an NBA record. Under Westhead, the Nuggets were sometimes called the "Enver Nuggets" (as in no "D", or no defense). The next year the Nuggets drafted Dikembe Mutombo, who made the All-Star team, and played at a more conservative pace scoring just 99.7 points per game. However, they only improved to 24 wins, largely because they continued to give up points so quickly that even their prolific offense could not keep up. Westhead was fired after posting a combined two-year record of 44–120.

=== George Mason ===
Following his tenure with the Nuggets, Westhead returned to college coaching as the head coach of George Mason University from 1993 to 1997. This time, Westhead's run-and-gun style did not succeed at the college level, ending his tenure at Mason with a 38–70 record. Westhead was succeeded at Mason by Jim Larranaga after the 1996–1997 season.

=== Golden State Warriors ===
From 1997 to 1999, Westhead was an assistant coach with the Golden State Warriors under head coach P. J. Carlesimo.

== 2000s ==
=== Los Angeles Stars ===
Westhead was the head coach of the Los Angeles Stars in the inaugural season of the new ABA in 2000–2001.

=== Panasonic Super Kangaroos ===
Westhead was the head coach of the Panasonic Super Kangaroos of the Japan Basketball League from 2001 to 2003.

=== Long Beach Jam ===
Westhead returned to the ABA as the head coach of Long Beach Jam in 2003. He coached the team for only one game before returning to the NBA.

=== Orlando Magic ===
From 2003 to 2005, Westhead was an assistant coach with the Orlando Magic under head coach Johnny Davis.

=== Phoenix Mercury ===
In 2005, Westhead was hired as the head coach of the WNBA's Phoenix Mercury, a position that he held until the 2007 WNBA season concluded. In 2007, Westhead coached the Mercury to a WNBA championship, making him the only coach to win a championship in the NBA and the WNBA. Led by Diana Taurasi, the Mercury won using Westhead's fast-paced approach.

=== Seattle SuperSonics/Oklahoma City Thunder ===
On September 27, 2007, he agreed to a contract with the NBA's Seattle SuperSonics to be an assistant coach under longtime friend P. J. Carlesimo. Following the season, the franchise moved to Oklahoma City and was renamed the Thunder. When Carlesimo was relieved of his duties on November 21, 2008, Westhead was also released as an assistant at that time.

== 2010s ==
=== University of Oregon, women's basketball ===
On March 26, 2009, University of Oregon Athletic Director Pat Kilkenny introduced Paul Westhead as the Ducks' newest head coach. As the sixth head coach in the history of Oregon women's basketball, this was Westhead's first job as head coach of an NCAA women's program (although he had coached women's teams at the professional level before).

On March 4, 2014, the University of Oregon announced that they would not renew Westhead's contract, which expired March 31, 2014. Westhead was 65–90 overall at Oregon and 27–64 in conference play in five seasons. Westhead's Oregon contract was worth more than $3 million for five years, with his final season earning him $675,000.

== Head coaching record ==
=== Men's college basketball ===
Record table
Season	Team	Overall	Conference	Standing	Postseason
La Salle Explorers (Middle Atlantic Conferences) (1970–1974)
1970–71	La Salle	20–7	5–1	2nd (East)	NIT first round
1971–72	La Salle	6–19	2–4	T–4th (East)	
1972–73	La Salle	15–10	3–3	4th (East)	
1973–74	La Salle	18–10	5–1	T–1st (East)	
La Salle Explorers (East Coast Conference) (1974–1979)
1974–75	La Salle	22–7	5–1	T–1st (East)	NCAA Division I first round
1975–76	La Salle	11–15	1–4	T–5th (East)	
1976–77	La Salle	17–12	3–2	3rd (East)	
1977–78	La Salle	18–12	5–0	1st (East)	NCAA Division I first round
1978–79	La Salle	15–13	10–3	3rd (East)	
La Salle:		142–105 (.575)			
Loyola Marymount Lions (West Coast Conference) (1985–1990)
1985–86	Loyola Marymount	19–11	10–4	2nd	NIT second round
1986–87	Loyola Marymount	12–16	4–10	8th	
1987–88	Loyola Marymount	28–4	14–0	1st	NCAA Division I second round
1988–89	Loyola Marymount	20–11	10–4	T–2nd	NCAA Division I first round
1989–90	Loyola Marymount	26–6	13–1	1st	NCAA Division I Elite Eight
Loyola Marymount:		105–48 (.686)	51–19 (.729)		
George Mason Patriots (Colonial Athletic Association) (1993–1997)
1993–94	George Mason	10–17	5–9	T–6th	
1994–95	George Mason	7–20	2–12	8th	
1995–96	George Mason	11–16	6–10	T–6th	
1996–97	George Mason	10–17	4–12	9th	
George Mason:		38–70 (.352)	17–44 (.279)		
Total:		285–223 (.561)			
National champion Postseason invitational champion Conference regular season champion Conference regular season and conference tournament champion Division regular season champion Division regular season and conference tournament champion Conference tournament champion

=== NBA ===
Legend
Regular season	G	Games coached	W	Games won	L	Games lost	W–L %	Win–loss %
Playoffs	PG	Playoff games	PW	Playoff wins	PL	Playoff losses	PW–L %	Playoff win–loss %

Team	Year	G	W	L	W–L%	Finish	PG	PW	PL	PW–L%	Result
Los Angeles	1979–80	68	50	18	.735	1st in Pacific	16	12	4	.750	Won NBA Championship
Los Angeles	1980–81	82	54	28	.659	2nd in Pacific	3	1	2	.333	Lost in first round
Los Angeles	1981–82	11	7	4	.636	(fired)	–	–	–	–	–
Chicago	1982–83	82	28	54	.341	4th in Central	–	–	–	–	Missed Playoffs
Denver	1990–91	82	20	62	.244	7th in Midwest	–	–	–	–	Missed Playoffs
Denver	1991–92	82	24	58	.293	4th in Midwest	–	–	–	–	Missed Playoffs
Career		407	183	224	.450		19	13	6	.684	

=== WNBA ===
Legend
Regular season	G	Games coached	W	Games won	L	Games lost	W–L %	Win–loss %
Playoffs	PG	Playoff games	PW	Playoff wins	PL	Playoff losses	PW–L %	Playoff win–loss %

Team	Year	G	W	L	W–L%	Finish	PG	PW	PL	PW–L%	Result
PHX	2006	34	18	16	.529	5th in West	–	–	–	–	Missed Playoffs
PHX	2007	34	23	11	.676	1st in West	9	7	2	.778	Won WNBA Finals
Career		68	41	27	.603		9	7	3	.778	

=== Women's college basketball ===
Record table
Season	Team	Overall	Conference	Standing	Postseason
Oregon Ducks (Pacific-10/Pac-12 Conference) (2009–2014)
2009–10	Oregon	18–16	7–11	T–6th	WNIT third round
2010–11	Oregon	13–17	4–14	9th	
2011–12	Oregon	15–16	7–11	9th	
2012–13	Oregon	4–27	2–16	12th	
2013–14	Oregon	16–16	6–12	10th	WNIT second round
Oregon:		66–92 (.418)	26–64 (.289)		
Total:		66–92 (.418)			
