= Forrest McKenzie =

American basketball player (born 1963)

Personal information
- Born: February 16, 1963 (age 63) Camden, New Jersey
- Listed height: 6 ft 7 in (2.01 m)
- Listed weight: 200 lb (91 kg)

Career information
- High school: Pasadena (Pasadena, California)
- College: Loyola Marymount (1981–1986)
- NBA draft: 1986: 3rd round, 48th overall pick
- Drafted by: San Antonio Spurs
- Playing career: 1986–2002
- Position: Small forward
- Number: 7

Career history
- 1986: San Antonio Spurs
- 1988–1989: Elitzur Ramla
- 1989–1990: Clube Desportivo do Montijo
- 1990–1991: BCM Gravelines
- 1991–1992: Tours Joué Basket
- 1992–1994: Maccabi Haifa
- 1994–1995: Ajaccio
- 1995–1996: Angers BC 49
- 1996–1999: Toulouse Spacers
- 1999–2000: JSA Bordeaux
- 2000–2001: Saint-Quentin
- 2001–2002: Étoile de Charleville-Mézières

Career highlights
- 3× All-WCC (1983, 1984, 1986)
- Stats at NBA.com
- Stats at Basketball Reference

Forrest David Walton McKenzie (born February 16, 1963) is an American former professional basketball player. He played in six National Basketball Association games.

== Career statistics ==
Legend
GP	Games played	GS	Games started	MPG	Minutes per game
FG%	Field goal percentage	3P%	3-point field goal percentage	FT%	Free throw percentage
RPG	Rebounds per game	APG	Assists per game	SPG	Steals per game
BPG	Blocks per game	PPG	Points per game	**Bold**	Career high

=== NBA ===
==== Regular season ====
Year	Team	GP	GS	MPG	FG%	3P%	FT%	RPG	APG	SPG	BPG	PPG
1986–87	San Antonio	6	0	7.0	.250	.500	1.000	1.2	.2	.2	.0	2.8
