= Keith Smith (basketball) =

American basketball player (born 1964)

Personal information
- Born: March 9, 1964 (age 62) Flint, Michigan, U.S.
- Listed height: 6 ft 3 in (1.91 m)
- Listed weight: 180 lb (82 kg)

Career information
- High school: West Covina (West Covina, California)
- College: Loyola Marymount (1982–1986)
- NBA draft: 1986: 2nd round, 45th overall pick
- Drafted by: Milwaukee Bucks
- Position: Shooting guard
- Number: 11

Career history
- 1986–1987: Milwaukee Bucks
- Stats at NBA.com
- Stats at Basketball Reference

Keith LeWayne Smith (born March 9, 1964) is an American former basketball player who played in the National Basketball Association (NBA).

== Biography ==
Smith was born in Flint, Michigan and graduated from West Covina High School in West Covina, California. He played college basketball at Loyola Marymount University. He was awarded All-Conference First-Team Honors in 1984, 1985, and 1986 while attending Loyola Marymount University.

Smith was drafted by the Milwaukee Bucks in the second round of the 1986 NBA draft and spent the following season with the team. He played one season in the NBA.

In 2000 Smith was inducted into the Athletic Hall of Fame at Loyola Marymount University.

Smith is currently a head coach for Hamady High School's lady hawk basketball team where he has won back to back class c state titles in 2009 and 2010.

== Career statistics ==
Legend
GP	Games played	GS	Games started	MPG	Minutes per game
FG%	Field goal percentage	3P%	3-point field goal percentage	FT%	Free throw percentage
RPG	Rebounds per game	APG	Assists per game	SPG	Steals per game
BPG	Blocks per game	PPG	Points per game	**Bold**	Career high

=== NBA ===
==== Regular season ====
Year	Team	GP	GS	MPG	FG%	3P%	FT%	RPG	APG	SPG	BPG	PPG
1986–87	Milwaukee	42	4	11.0	.380	.333	.750	.8	1.0	.6	.1	3.3
