= Hank Gathers =

American basketball player (1967–1990)

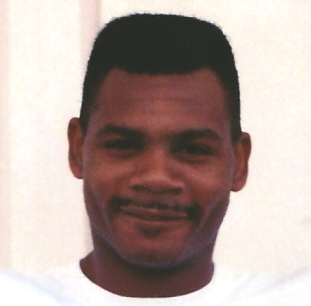
- Gathers in 1990

Personal information
- Born: February 11, 1967 Philadelphia, Pennsylvania, U.S.
- Died: March 4, 1990 (aged 23) Los Angeles, California, U.S.
- Listed height: 6 ft 7 in (2.01 m)
- Listed weight: 210 lb (95 kg)

Career information
- High school: Dobbins Technical (Philadelphia, Pennsylvania)
- College: USC (1985–1986); Loyola Marymount (1987–1990)
- Position: Power forward
- Number: 44

Career highlights
- Consensus second-team All-American (1990); Second-team All-American – USBWA (1989); Third-team All-American – AP, UPI (1989); NCAA scoring champion (1989); NCAA rebounding leader (1989); WCC Player of the Year (1989); 3× First-team All-WCC (1988–1990); 2× WCC tournament MVP (1988, 1989); No. 44 retired by Loyola Marymount Lions

Eric Wilson "Hank" Gathers Jr. (February 11, 1967 – March 4, 1990) was an American college basketball player for the Loyola Marymount Lions. As a junior in 1989, he became the second player in NCAA Division I history to lead the nation in scoring and rebounding in the same season. Gathers was a consensus second-team All-American as a senior in 1990. His No. 44 was retired by the Lions, who also placed a statue of him in his honor outside their home arena Gersten Pavilion.

Gathers began his college career with the USC Trojans, but transferred with teammate Bo Kimble to Loyola Marymount after his freshman year. Playing under Lions coach Paul Westhead and his fast-paced system, Gathers was a three-time first-team all-conference selection in the West Coast Conference (WCC). In his first season with the Lions, he earned the first of two consecutive most valuable player (MVP) honors in the WCC tournament. As a junior, he was named the WCC Player of the Year and began receiving All-American recognition. Early in his senior year in 1989–90, Gathers was diagnosed with an abnormal heartbeat after he collapsed during a game. He was placed on medication and returned a few weeks later, but he initially struggled, which he attributed to his medication. The dosage was gradually decreased, and his play recovered. Gathers died at age 23 after collapsing for the second time that season during the semifinals of the 1990 WCC tournament.

== Early life ==
Gathers was born to Lucille and Eric Gathers Sr. in Philadelphia. Growing up in the Raymond Rosen Projects, he stayed out of trouble by playing basketball.

Gathers played prep ball at Dobbins Technical High School, located in North Philadelphia. He was joined on the team by his younger brother, Derrick Gathers, Bo Kimble and Doug Overton. The Mustangs reached the Philadelphia Public League championship game in consecutive years, losing to a Pooh Richardson-led Benjamin Franklin High in 1984 before winning the title over Lionel Simmons' South Philadelphia High in 1985.

== College career ==
=== USC ===
Gathers and Kimble were not friends until their senior year at Dobbins. Both of them were recruited to the University of Southern California (USC) by head coach Stan Morrison and his top assistant David Spencer. During a visit to USC, the two recruits were told that the area around campus was deemed a slum. Gathers and Kimble, however, considered the area to be a suburb compared to their home of Philadelphia. Gathers made up his mind early that he would join USC, while Kimble decided independently and only after spurning Temple late. They were joined on the Trojans by high school All-American, Tom Lewis, and Rich Grande as the "Four Freshmen" star recruiting class. Following an 11–17 season in 1985–86, Morrison and Spencer were fired despite having won the Pac-10 Conference the previous year. It was reported that the players would not remain unless certain conditions were met, including having a say in the next coaching staff.

USC hired George Raveling as the next head coach of the Trojans. Raveling gave the players a deadline to respond whether they would remain on the team. When they did not respond, he revoked the scholarships of Gathers, Kimble, and Lewis. Raveling's controversial statement was, "You can't let the Indians run the reservation," he said. "You've got to be strong, too. Sometimes you have to tell them that they have to exit." Kimble and Gathers transferred together from USC to Loyola Marymount University (LMU). Lewis transferred to Pepperdine. Grande remained at USC.

=== Loyola Marymount ===
Due to NCAA regulations, Gathers and Kimble could not play in the season following their transfer. They helped lead the Lions to a 28–4 record in 1987–88. Gathers led the team that year in both scoring and rebounding (averaging 22.5 points and 8.7 rebounds per game), was named first-team All-WCC and was awarded the WCC tournament MVP. In the 1988–89 season, Gathers became the second player in NCAA Division I history to lead the nation in scoring and rebounding in the same season, (Note: Xavier McDaniel was the first in 1984–85.) averaging 32.7 points and 13.7 rebounds per game. He was named WCC Player of the Year and again won the WCC Tournament MVP. On December 30, 1988, he scored a career-high 49 points along with 26 rebounds in a 130–125 win over Nevada. After the season, he decided against declaring for the NBA draft.

As a senior in 1989–90, he was a candidate for national player of the year and projected as an NBA lottery pick. Gathers' head coach while at LMU, Paul Westhead, had instituted an extraordinarily fast-paced game plan. On offense, the Lions took numerous three-point shots, and typically shot the ball within 10 seconds of gaining possession. Their defense was a full-court press designed to force their opponents into a frenzied up-and-down game. Gathers' teams led Division I in scoring in 1988 (110.3 points per game), 1989 (112.5), and 1990 (122.4). LMU's 122.4 point per game in 1990 is still a record as of April 2012. As of April 2012, Loyola Marymount held the five highest combined score games in Division I history. Four of the five occurred during Gathers' career, including a record 331 in the 181–150 win over United States International University on January 31, 1989.

At 6 feet 7 inches (2.01 m) and 210 pounds (95 kg), Gathers was Loyola Marymount's strongest inside player. He had a high field goal percentage because he seldom shot from beyond 10 feet (3.0 m). He used his power and quickness for follow-up baskets and scoring on fast breaks. "I don't care much about the points," said Gathers. "In fact, I should lead the nation in scoring because of my rebounding. Anybody can score 30 points a night if that's what he's concentrating on. But rebounding is special because it comes from the heart."

== Heart condition and death ==
On December 9, 1989, Gathers collapsed at an LMU home game against UC Santa Barbara. He was found to have an abnormal heartbeat (exercise-induced ventricular tachycardia), and was prescribed a beta blocker, Inderal. However, Gathers felt that the medication adversely affected his play, and his dosage was gradually cut back. Originally prescribed at 240 milligrams per day, his Inderal dosage was cut to 40 mg per day over the next three months. Gathers returned after sitting out for three weeks and missing two games, and he averaged 29.3 minutes and 29.15 points in his 20 games through the remainder of the season. However, he struggled with his play for weeks after returning. His play recovered in a nationally televised game against LSU on February 3, 1990, when he scored 48 points along with 13 rebounds while being guarded by future NBA first-round draft picks Stanley Roberts and Shaquille O'Neal in a 148–141 overtime loss. The Lions won seven of their next eight games, and Gathers recorded a career-high 30 rebounds against Saint Mary's.

On February 26, 1990, as the WCC Tournament neared, Gathers' medication was reduced one last time from 80 to 40 mg, on the condition that he undergo testing in a couple of days to determine if it was safe and effective at suppressing the arrhythmias. He did not show up for his test that week and avoided calls from his cardiologist's office. On March 2, he had a long talk with the cardiologist, who told him to play and come in for the testing after the tournament concluded. It was later suspected Gathers was not taking any dosage on game days. The following day in the WCC tournament quarterfinals in Los Angeles, he recorded 28 points and 11 rebounds in a 121–84 win over Gonzaga.

On Sunday, March 4, Gathers collapsed again with 13:34 left in the first half of the semifinal game against the Portland Pilots. He had just scored a dunk on an alley-oop pass from point guard Terrell Lowery that put the Lions up 25–13. Thirteen seconds later while positioned around midcourt in the Lions' fullcourt press, he collapsed a yard or two away from Pilots point guard Erik Spoelstra. He attempted to get up, telling the athletic trainers, "I don't want to lay down!" Shortly after, he stopped breathing. Gathers was pronounced dead at nearby Marina Del Rey Hospital at 6:55 PM PST. He was 23 years old.

Minutes after Gathers was taken to the hospital, the WCC commissioner suspended the game indefinitely. ESPN showed graphic footage of Gathers' collapse on SportsCenter; the network was at the game recording advance footage for the championship game it was scheduled to televise the next night. Late that night, the WCC canceled the tournament and awarded Loyola the conference's automatic bid to the NCAA tournament due to its WCC regular season title.

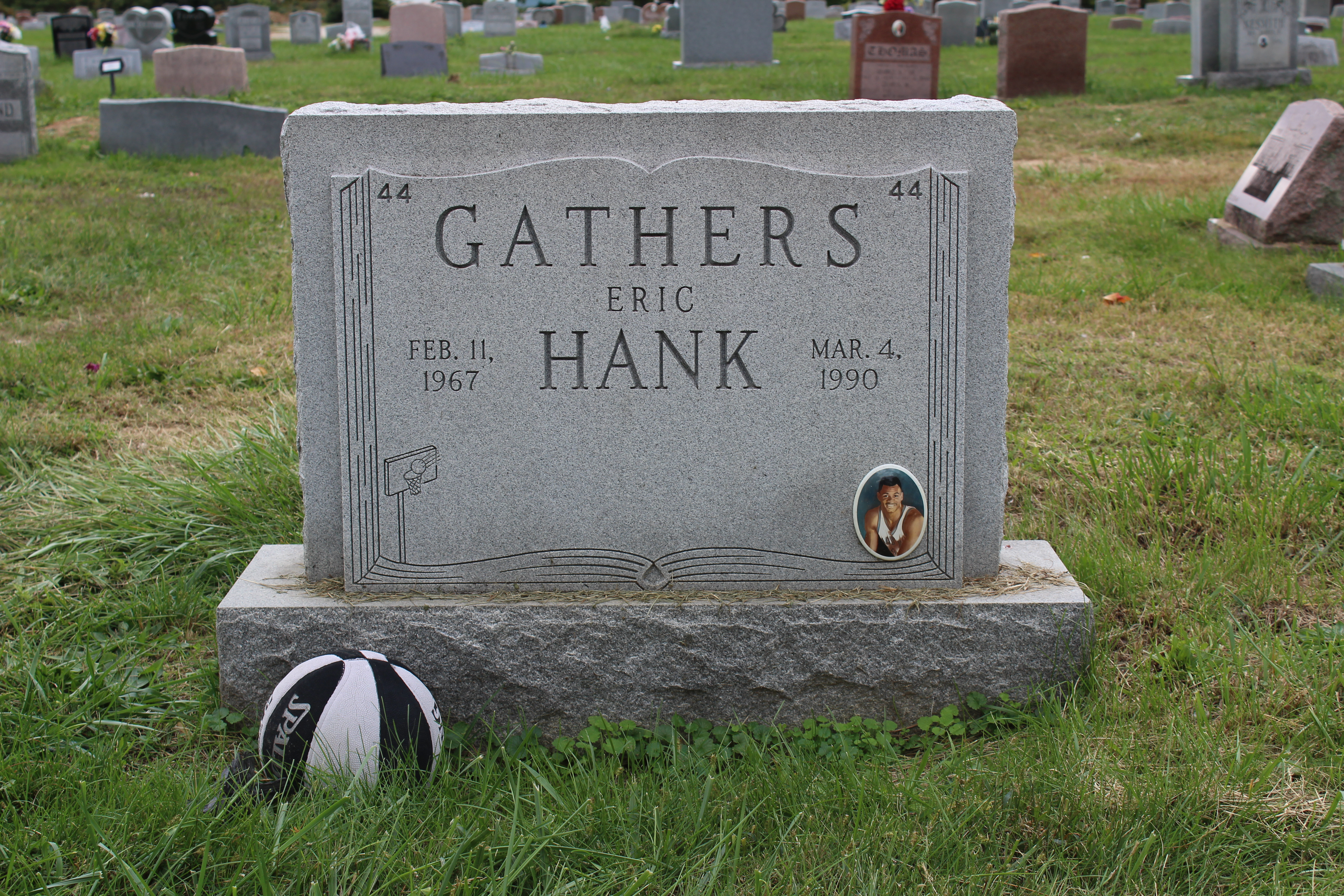
Gathers' tombstone in Mount Lawn Cemetery in Sharon Hill, Pennsylvania

Gathers was buried at the Mount Lawn Cemetery in Sharon Hill, Pennsylvania. An autopsy found that he suffered from a heart-muscle disorder, hypertrophic cardiomyopathy. His family later filed a $32.5 million lawsuit charging negligence. Loyola Marymount settled out of court for $1.4 million, while the cardiologist who treated Gathers settled for $1 million.

== Legacy ==
Loyola Marymount was placed in the West Regional as the No. 11 seed in that season's NCAA tournament. Before the tournament, the right-handed Kimble vowed to shoot his first free throw of each game left-handed, in memory of Gathers. Though naturally right-handed, Gathers was a poor free-throw shooter and had switched to shooting them left-handed. The Lions advanced to the Elite Eight, including a victory over defending national champion Michigan, before falling to the eventual champions, UNLV. Kimble finished a perfect 3-for-3 on his left-handed free throws during the tournament. (Note: Kimble shot free throws in three of Loyola's four tournament games, with none in their Sweet 16 win over Alabama.) Both LMU's Cinderella story without Gathers and Kimble's left-handed tributes to him became part of NCAA tournament lore.

Gathers was named a consensus second-team All-America and first team All-WCC selection for the season. He finished his career averaging 28.0 points and making 59 percent of his field goals, which were both school records as of 2010. He also averaged 11.1 rebounds for his career. He was voted WCC Player of the Decade for the 1980s.

Gersten Pavilion, LMU's on-campus athletics facility, is known to Lions fans as "Hank's House", although that is not part of its official name. His No. 44 and Kimble's No. 30 were retired by LMU in a joint ceremony in 2000. In 2005, the entire 1989–90 team was inducted into Loyola Marymount's Hall of Fame. On February 29, 2020, four days before the 30th anniversary of his death, a statue of Gathers was unveiled outside Gersten Pavilion. The statue was created by Rotblatt-Amrany, which designed multiple statues outside of the Staples Center in Los Angeles, as well as the Michael Jordan statue in Chicago.

Gathers' life was dramatized in a 1992 TV movie, Final Shot: The Hank Gathers Story, with Victor Love starring as Gathers. Gathers was part of the storyline in the ESPN film Guru of Go about Westhead, part of their 30 for 30 series.

Gathers' death reemerged in national news wires during the 2016 NBA Playoffs when Kimble, interviewed for the celebrity gossip website TMZ.com, urged that Miami Heat star Chris Bosh retire for health reasons. Bosh has been suffering from blood clotting issues that forced him to miss the last several months of both the 2014–15 and 2015–16 seasons, as well as the entirety of the 2016–17 season. While Bosh felt that he was healthy enough to continue playing, Kimble disagreed:

There are so many other things he could do with his life. Hank Gathers had the same thing, Hank could have been a comedian, an actor or did speaking engagements. It's not worth the risk. I would just say absolutely not, don't do it. If Hank had the ability to do it again he wouldn't have paid the ultimate price ... I am sure [Bosh] has children and they are going to need their father around as much as possible.

== Career statistics ==
Year	Team	GP	GS	MPG	FG%	3P%	FT%	RPG	APG	SPG	BPG	PPG
1985–86	USC	28	12	23.9	.529	–	.576	5.1	.8	.6	.4	8.3
1987–88	Loyola Marymount	32	31	29.6	.562	.000	.543	8.7	1.3	1.4	.7	22.5
1988–89	Loyola Marymount	31	31	34.1	.608	.000	.562	13.7	2.1	1.4	.7	32.7
1989–90	Loyola Marymount	26	26	30.2	.595	.000	.568	10.8	1.5	1.7	.9	29.0
Career		117	100	29.6	.585	.000	.560	9.6	1.4	1.3	.7	23.3

== Awards and records ==
=== Awards ===
- 1989 WCC Player of the Year
- 2× WCC Tournament MVP (1988, 1989)
- Consensus second-team All-American (1990)
- 3× First-team All-WCC (1988, 1989, 1990)
- 2× All-WCC Tournament (1988, 1989)

=== Records ===
WCC

- Career points (2,490)
- Field goals made, career (1,037)
- Field goals made, season (419)
- Free throws attempted, career (745)
- Free throws attempted, season (315)

LMU

- Career scoring average (28.0)
- Field goals made, game (24)
- Field goals attempted, game (37)
- Field goal percentage, career (.590)
- Rebounds, game (29)

=== Achievements ===
- 1989 NCAA Division I scoring leader
- 1989 NCAA Division I rebounding leader

== Personal life ==
Gathers was 16 when his son, Aaron Crump, was born. Crump was age six when his father died. He received $1.5 million from Gathers' wrongful-death lawsuits. He gained control of the money when he turned 18. It became a problem for Crump, who later described himself as a "young black male with no guidance" at that time. He pleaded guilty to aggravated assault with a weapon, and was in a state prison from 2007 until 2012. By the time he was released, the settlement money he received from Gathers' death had been squandered. Crump became a salesperson. He also mentors children through the Hank Gathers Legacy Group that he founded.

Gathers' nephew, D.J. Rivera, played college basketball at St. Joesph's University before transferring to Binghamton University and leading the America East Conference in scoring with the Binghamton Bearcats in the 2008–09 season, in which they won the conference for the first time and earned their first bid to the NCAA tournament, where Rivera scored 20 points in a first-round loss against Duke. He later transferred to the University of Montevallo, losing in the Division II championship game in 2012. Another nephew, Jordan Gathers, earned a bachelor's degree at St. Bonaventure University and played three seasons for their Bonnies basketball team from 2011 to 2014. He played a final season with Butler in 2015–16 as a graduate transfer.

== See also ==
- Sudden cardiac death of athletes
- List of basketball players who died during their careers
- List of NCAA Division I men's basketball season rebounding leaders
- List of NCAA Division I men's basketball season scoring leaders
- List of NCAA Division I men's basketball players with 2,000 points and 1,000 rebounds
