= 1989–90 Loyola Marymount Lions men's basketball team =

American college basketball season

1989–90 Loyola Marymount Lions men's basketball

WCC regular season Champions Gator Bowl tournament champions

NCAA tournament, Elite Eight
- Conference: West Coast Conference

Ranking
- AP: No. 21
- Record: 26–6 (13–1 WCC)
- Head coach: Paul Westhead (5th season)
- Assistant coaches: Jay Hillock (5th season); Judas Prada; Bruce Woods
- Home arena: Gersten Pavilion

1989–90 West Coast Conference men's basketball standings
	Conf.				Overall
Team	W		L	PCT	W		L	PCT
No. 21 Loyola Marymount	13	–	1	.929	26	–	6	.813
Pepperdine	10	–	4	.714	17	–	11	.607
San Diego	9	–	5	.643	16	–	12	.571
Portland	7	–	7	.500	11	–	17	.393
Santa Clara	6	–	8	.429	9	–	19	.321
San Francisco	4	–	10	.286	8	–	20	.286
Saint Mary's	4	–	10	.286	7	–	20	.259
Gonzaga	3	–	11	.214	8	–	20	.286
Rankings from AP poll

The 1989–90 Loyola Marymount Lions men's basketball team represented Loyola Marymount University during the 1989–90 NCAA Division I men's basketball season. The Lions were led by fifth-year head coach Paul Westhead. They played their home games at Gersten Pavilion in Los Angeles, California as members of the West Coast Conference.

Powered by consensus Second-Team All-Americans Hank Gathers and Bo Kimble, LMU led the nation in scoring for the third consecutive year and established an NCAA record of 122.4 points per game. Kimble won the NCAA individual scoring title by averaging 35.3 points per game.

On March 4, 1990, Gathers collapsed and died during a WCC Tournament Semifinal matchup against Portland. The team is remembered for honoring Gathers with a run to the Elite Eight as the 11 seed in the West Region of the NCAA tournament. They would become the first WCC team to reach the Elite Eight in 33 years. The Lions defeated New Mexico State 111–92, defending National Champion Michigan 149–115, and Alabama 62–60 before falling 131–101 to UNLV, the eventual National Champion.

== Roster ==
1989–90 Loyola Marymount Lions men's basketball team
Players
Coaches

Pos.	#	Name	Height	Weight	Year	Previous school	Hometown
C	00	Marcellus Lee	6 ft 10 in (2.08 m)	230 lb (104 kg)	Sr		Pomona, CA
G	3	Greg Walker	5 ft 11 in (1.8 m)	163 lb (74 kg)	Fr		San Jose, CA
F	4	Per Stumer	6 ft 7 in (2.01 m)	210 lb (95 kg)	Jr		Södertälje, Sweden
G	11	Tom Peabody	6 ft 3 in (1.91 m)	180 lb (82 kg)	Jr		Santa Ana, CA
G	12	Tony Walker	6 ft 1 in (1.85 m)	—	Jr		Riverside, CA
F	14	John O'Connell	6 ft 6 in (1.98 m)	205 lb (93 kg)	So		Glenside, PA
G	20	Terrell Lowery	6 ft 2 in (1.88 m)	160 lb (73 kg)	So	Oakland Technical HS	Oakland, CA
G	21	Jeff Fryer	6 ft 2 in (1.88 m)	180 lb (82 kg)	Sr	Corona del Mar HS	Newport Beach, CA
F	23	Jeff Roscoe	6 ft 9 in (2.06 m)	210 lb (95 kg)	Sr		Puyallup, WA
G	30	Bo Kimble	6 ft 4 in (1.93 m)	190 lb (86 kg)	Sr	Dobbins Technical HS/USC	Philadelphia, PA
F/C	31	Chris Scott	6 ft 8 in (2.03 m)	205 lb (93 kg)	Fr		Union City, CA
C	34	Chris Knight	6 ft 9 in (2.06 m)	—	So		Los Angeles, CA
F	44	Hank Gathers	6 ft 7 in (2.01 m)	210 lb (95 kg)	Sr	Dobbins Technical HS/USC	Philadelphia, PA
F	50	Marcus Slater	6 ft 8 in (2.03 m)	190 lb (86 kg)	Jr		Carson, CA

Head coach

- Paul Westhead (Saint Joseph's)

Assistant coach(es)

- Jay Hillock (Gonzaga)
- Judas Prada
- Bruce Woods
- Paul Westhead Jr.

Legend

- (C) Team captain
- (S) Suspended
- (I) Ineligible
- (W) Walk-on
- Injured
- Current redshirt

Roster

== Schedule and results ==
Date time, TV	Rank^{#}	Opponent^{#}	Result	Record	High points	High rebounds	High assists	Site (attendance) city, state
Non-conference regular season
Nov 15, 1989*		at No. 1 UNLV; Preseason NIT	L 91–102	0–1	23 – Fryer	11 – Gathers	6 – Stumer	Thomas & Mack Center (13,430); Las Vegas, NV
Nov 25, 1989*		Nevada	W 145–102	1–1	31 – Kimble	17 – Gathers	10 – Lowery	Gersten Pavilion (3,663); Los Angeles, CA
Dec 1, 1989*		vs. Stetson; Gator Bowl Tournament	W 125–95	2–1	38 – Gathers	16 – Gathers	9 – Peabody	Jacksonville Memorial Coliseum (3,000); Jacksonville, FL
Dec 2, 1989*		at Jacksonville; Gator Bowl Tournament	W 106–105	3–1	32 – Gathers	7 – Stumer	7 – 2 tied	Jacksonville Memorial Coliseum (2,863); Jacksonville, FL
Dec 7, 1989*		at U.S. International	W 152–137	4–1	37 – Gathers	27 – Gathers	11 – Lowery	Golden Hall (1,264); San Diego, CA
Dec 9, 1989*		UC Santa Barbara	W 104–101	5–1	51 – Kimble	7 – Kimble	9 – Walker	Gersten Pavilion (4,000); Los Angeles, CA
Dec 19, 1989*		at No. 21 Oregon State	W 117–113	6–1	53 – Kimble	12 – Kimble	11 – Walker	Gill Coliseum (9,183); Corvallis, OR
Dec 23, 1989*		No. 7 Oklahoma	L 121–136	6–2	46 – Kimble	14 – Kimble	9 – Lowery	Gersten Pavilion (4,210); Los Angeles, CA
Dec 30, 1989*		Niagara	W 122–87	7–2	38 – Kimble	11 – Gathers	13 – Walker	Gersten Pavilion (3,563); Los Angeles, CA
Jan 2, 1990*	No. 25	Xavier	L 113–115	7–3	38 – Kimble	10 – Kimble	7 – Lowery	Cincinnati Gardens (8,000); Cincinnati, OH
Jan 4, 1990*	No. 25	at Saint Joseph's	W 99–96	8–3	54 – Kimble	9 – Kimble	3 – 2 tied	Hagan Arena (3,200); Philadelphia, PA
Jan 6, 1990*	No. 25	at No. 17 La Salle	W 121–116	9–3	32 – Kimble	12 – Gathers	8 – Walker	Convention Hall (10,254); Philadelphia, PA
WCC regular season
Jan 11, 1990	No. 23	at Santa Clara	W 113–100	10–3 (1–0)	35 – Kimble	12 – Gathers	7 – Lowery	Leavey Center (5,000); Santa Clara, CA
Jan 13, 1990	No. 23	at San Diego	W 119–112	11–3 (2–0)	32 – Gathers	7 – Stumer	7 – Walker	USD Sports Center (2,500); San Diego, CA
Jan 19, 1990	No. 21	Gonzaga	W 144–100	12–3 (3–0)	30 – Kimble	14 – Gathers	7 – Walker	Gersten Pavilion (4,085); Los Angeles, CA
Jan 20, 1990	No. 21	Portland	W 131–106	13–3 (4–0)	27 – Gathers	12 – Stumer	9 – Lowery	Gersten Pavilion (4,156); Los Angeles, CA
Jan 25, 1990	No. 22	at Portland	W 126–103	14–3 (5–0)	39 – Kimble	11 – Kimble, Gathers	8 – Walker	Chiles Center (4,886); Portland, OR
Jan 27, 1990	No. 22	at Gonzaga	W 99–88	15–3 (6–0)	31 – Kimble, Gathers	8 – Stumer	6 – Walker	"The Kennel" (4,143); Spokane, WA
Feb 1, 1990	No. 20	Saint Mary's (CA)	W 150–119	16–3 (7–0)	44 – Gathers	13 – Gathers	10 – Walker	Gersten Pavilion (4,156); Los Angeles, CA
Feb 3, 1990*; CBS	No. 20	at No. 14 LSU	L 141–148 ^{OT}	16–4	48 – Gathers	13 – Gathers	9 – Lowery	Maravich Assembly Center (14,084); Baton Rouge, LA
Feb 4, 1990	No. 20	San Francisco	W 157–115	17–4 (8–0)	50 – Kimble	13 – Gathers	13 – Walker	Gersten Pavilion (4,110); Los Angeles, CA
Feb 9, 1990	No. 20	at San Francisco	W 137–123	18–4 (9–0)	37 – Kimble	4 – 3 tied	7 – Lowery	War Memorial Gymnasium (5,387); San Francisco, CA
Feb 10, 1990	No. 20	Saint Mary's (CA)	W 139–110	19–4 (10–0)	33 – Kimble	13 – Gathers	5 – 3 tied	McKeon Pavilion (3,500); Moraga, CA
Feb 14, 1990	No. 19	Pepperdine	W 131–116	20–4 (11–0)	40 – Fryer	12 – Gathers	10 – Lowery	Gersten Pavilion (4,156); Los Angeles, CA
Feb 17, 1990	No. 19	Pepperdine	L 123–131	20–5 (11–1)	32 – Kimble, Gathers	13 – Gathers	5 – Walker	Firestone Fieldhouse (3,529); Malibu, CA
Feb 23, 1990	No. 22	San Diego	W 131–119	21–5 (12–1)	43 – Kimble	8 – Gathers	13 – Walker	Gersten Pavilion (4,156); Los Angeles, CA
Feb 24, 1990	No. 22	Santa Clara	W 117–81	22–5 (13–1)	35 – Kimble	11 – Kimble	7 – Walker	Gersten Pavilion (4,156); Los Angeles, CA
WCC Tournament
Mar 3, 1990*	(1) No. 22	(8) Gonzaga; Quarterfinals	W 121–84	23–5	28 – Gathers	12 – Stumer	11 – Walker	Gersten Pavilion (3,875); Los Angeles, CA
NCAA Tournament
Mar 16, 1990*; CBS	(11 W) No. 21	vs. (6 W) No. 24 New Mexico State; NCAA Tournament Round of 64	W 111–92	24–5	45 – Kimble	18 – Kimble	5 – 2 tied	Long Beach Arena (12,200); Long Beach, CA
Mar 18, 1990*; CBS	(11 W) No. 21	vs. (3 W) No. 13 Michigan; NCAA Tournament Round of 32	W 149–115	25–5	41 – Fryer	8 – Stumer	9 – Walker	Long Beach Arena (12,000); Long Beach, CA
Mar 23, 1990*; CBS	(11 W) No. 21	vs. (7 W) No. 23 Alabama; West Regional semifinal	W 62–60	26–5	19 – Kimble	12 – Stumer	2 – 2 tied	Oakland–Alameda County Coliseum Arena (12,972); Oakland, CA
Mar 25, 1990*; CBS	(11 W) No. 21	vs. (1 W) No. 2 UNLV; West Regional final	L 101–131	26–6	42 – Kimble	11 – Kimble	6 – Lowery	Oakland–Alameda County Coliseum Arena (14,298); Oakland, CA
*Non-conference game. ^{#}Rankings from AP Poll. (#) Tournament seedings in parentheses.

== Rankings ==
Ranking movements Legend: ██ Increase in ranking ██ Decrease in ranking — = Not ranked RV = Received votes
	Week																
Poll	Pre	1	2	3	4	5	6	7	8	9	10	11	12	13	14	15	Final
AP	—	—	—	—	—	—	25	23	21	22	20	20	19	22	22	21	21
Coaches	—	—	—	—	—	—	—	—	18	—	—	—	—	20	—	—	RV

*Final AP and Coaches rankings released prior to NCAA tournament

== Awards ==
All-Americans

- Hank Gathers – Consensus 2nd Team
- Bo Kimble – Consensus 2nd Team

NCAA Scoring Leader

- Bo Kimble – 35.3 PPG

WCC Player of the Year

- Bo Kimble

== Records ==
Season

- Points Per Game – 122.4 (3,918 points in 32 games)
- Games with at Least 100 Points – 28
- Consecutive Games with at Least 100 Points – 12

NCAA Tournament

Team

- Most points in an NCAA Tournament game – 149 vs. Michigan (March 18, 1990)
- Most combined points in an NCAA Tournament game – 264 vs. Michigan (March 18, 1990)
- Most 3-point field goals in an NCAA Tournament game – 21 vs. Michigan (March 18, 1990)
- Points Per Game – 105.8 (423 points in 4 games)

Individual

- Most 3-point field goals made (single game) – 11 by Jeff Fryer vs. Michigan (March 18, 1990)
- Most 3-point field goals attempted (single game) – 22 by Jeff Fryer vs. Michigan (March 18, 1990)

== Players in the 1990 NBA draft ==
Round	Pick	Player	NBA club
1	8	Bo Kimble	Los Angeles Clippers
