= Loyola Marymount Lions men's basketball =

Men's college basketball team

2026–27 Loyola Marymount Lions men's basketball team
- University: Loyola Marymount University
- Head coach: Stan Johnson (6th season)
- Location: Los Angeles, California
- Arena: Gersten Pavilion (capacity: 4,156)
- Conference: West Coast Conference
- Nickname: Lions
- Colors: Crimson and blue

NCAA Division I tournament Elite Eight
- 1990
Other NCAA Division I tournament results
Sweet Sixteen	1961, 1990
Appearances	1961, 1980*, 1988, 1989, 1990

Conference tournament champions
- 1988, 1989

Conference regular-season champions
- 1961, 1988, 1990

Uniforms
Home	Away	Alternate
- * vacated by NCAA

The Loyola Marymount Lions men's basketball team represents Loyola Marymount University in men's college basketball. The team competes in the West Coast Conference. The team has played its home game at Gersten Pavilion since 1981.

Loyola Marymount's last appearance in the NCAA Division I men's basketball tournament was in 1990, where they advanced to the Elite Eight. They lost to eventual national champion UNLV. Prior to the NCAA tournament, Lions star player Hank Gathers died during the West Coast Conference men's basketball tournament from a heart condition. The Lions defeated New Mexico State, defending champion Michigan, and Alabama. The 1990 squad was also the highest scoring team in NCAA Division I history with an average of 122.4 points per game.

== History ==
Loyola Marymount has played in the West Coast Conference since 1955, when the Lions and Pepperdine Waves joined the hitherto Northern Californian league that included Santa Clara University, the University of San Francisco, Saint Mary's College, and the University of Pacific. LMU has played in the WCC ever since, fostering heated rivalries with all WCC members, especially Pepperdine University and the University of San Diego, a WCC member since 1979.

LMU's early basketball history produced two Lions better known for their coaching tenures at other WCC schools than their LMU careers. Pete Newell and Phil Woolpert were classmates at LMU, graduating in 1939. Newell went on to coach the San Francisco Dons to the 1949 NIT title, and the California Golden Bears to the 1959 NCAA tournament championship. Newell is considered one of the most influential coaches in the history of basketball. Woolpert coached the legendary Bill Russell and K.C. Jones led University of San Francisco Dons to NCAA championships in 1954 and 1955.

Though LMU represented the WCC in the 1961 NCAA tournament, the Lions were consistently also rans in the WCC which included powerful University of San Francisco and Santa Clara University teams. Of note from LMU's early WCC teams is Rick Adelman, the 1968 WCC Player of the Year, who enjoyed a 7 year NBA career followed by a 30-year NBA coaching career.

The Lions burst onto the national basketball scene in the late 1980s under coach Paul Westhead. His teams led Division I in scoring in 1988 (110.3 points per game), 1989 (112.5) and 1990 (122.4). LMU's 122.4 point per game in 1990 was still a record as of October 2010. As of October 2010, Loyola Marymount held the five highest combined scoring games in Division I history. Four of the five occurred during Westhead's career, including a record 331 in the 181–150 win over United States International University on January 31, 1989.

Hank Gathers and Bo Kimble transferred to LMU from the University of Southern California. In the 1988–89 season, Gathers became the second player in NCAA Division I history to lead the nation in scoring and rebounding in the same season, averaging 32.7 points and 13.7 rebounds per game. In the 1989–90 season, Kimble led the nation in scoring averaging 35.3 points per game. Both Gathers and Kimble were consensus second team All-American selections in 1990.

In the 1989–90 season, during the second round of the WCC tournament, Gathers collapsed and died on the court due to a heart condition. The team nevertheless reached the Elite Eight in the 1990 NCAA tournament. Its three postseason wins included a 149–115 regional victory over Michigan that established NCAA men's tournament records for points by one team and combined points in a single game. The Lions ultimately were eliminated by UNLV, a team that went on to win the national championship. Loyola Marymount's final record was 26–6. Gathers (#44) and teammate Bo Kimble (#30) later had their jerseys retired by LMU.

LMU alumnus Mike Dunlap took over the program in 2014 and guided the Lions until the end of the 2020 season. Dunlap was formerly the head coach of the Charlotte Bobcats.

On March 20, 2020, Stan Johnson was announced as the 27th head coach of Loyola Marymount. In the 2022–23 season, Johnson became the only coach in West Coast Conference history to defeat BYU, Gonzaga, and Saint Mary's in the same season. After defeating BYU on 64–59 in the conference home opener on January 5, 2023, Johnson's Lions snapped Gonzaga's 75-game home win streak on Jan. 19, 2023 with a 68–67 win over the #6 team in the country. LMU then defeated #15 Saint Mary's at Gersten Pavilion on February 9, 2023, for his second nationally-ranked win of the season. Johnson has led LMU to two MTE (Multi-Team Event) Tournament titles in his tenure, winning the Jamaica Classic in 2022 and the Cancun Challenge in 2024.

== Postseason results ==
=== NCAA tournament results ===
The Lions have appeared in the NCAA tournament five times. Their combined record is 5–5.

Year	Seed	Round	Opponent	Result
1961		Regional semifinals Regional 3rd-place game	Utah; USC	L 75–91; W 69–67
1980	12	First round	(5) Arizona State	L 71–99
1988	10	First round Second Round	(7) Wyoming (2) North Carolina	W 119–115; L 97–123
1989	12	First round	(5) Arkansas	L 101–120
1990	11	First round Second Round; Sweet Sixteen; Elite Eight	(6) New Mexico State (3) Michigan (7) Alabama (1) UNLV	W 111–92; W 149–115; W 62–60; L 101–131

=== NIT results ===
The Lions have appeared in the National Invitation Tournament (NIT) one time. Their record is 1–1.

Year	Round	Opponent	Result
1986	First round Second Round	California; Wyoming	W 80–75; L 90–99

=== CIT results ===
The Lions have appeared in the CollegeInsider.com Postseason Tournament (CIT) two times. Their record is 2–2.

Year	Round	Opponent	Result
2010	First round	Pacific	L 76-86
2012	First round Second Round; Quarterfinals	Cal State-Fullerton; Weber State; Utah State	W 89–79; W 84–78^{OT} L 69–77

=== CBI results ===
The Lions have appeared in the College Basketball Invitational (CBI) one time. Their record is 2–1.

Year	Round	Opponent	Result
2019	First round Quarterfinals; Semifinals	California Baptist; Brown; South Florida	W 56–55; W 81–63; L 47–56

== Retired numbers ==
Loyola Marymount has retired two jersey numbers, both being two members of the 1990 Sweet Sixteen team.

Loyola Marymount Lions retired numbers
No.	Player	Pos.	Career	No. ret.	Ref.
30	Bo Kimble	SG	1987–1990	February 19, 2000	
44	Hank Gathers (Note: Posthumous honor.)	F	1987–1990	February 19, 2000	

== Lions in professional basketball ==
The following Lion players have played in the National Basketball Association (NBA):

- Rick Adelman
- Jean-Paul Afif
- Corey Gaines
- Normie Glick
- Jerry Grote
- Orlando Johnson
- Bo Kimble
- Forrest McKenzie
- Richard Petruška
- Keith Smith

The following Lions are playing in international basketball:

- James Batemon III (born 1997), basketball player in the Israeli Basketball Premier League
- Gabe Levin (born 1994), American-Israeli basketball player in the Israeli Basketball Premier League
- Eli Scott, basketball player in the Slovak Basketball League
