= Bo Kimble =

American basketball player (born 1966)

Personal information
- Born: April 9, 1966 (age 60) Philadelphia, Pennsylvania, U.S.
- Listed height: 6 ft 4 in (1.93 m)
- Listed weight: 190 lb (86 kg)

Career information
- High school: Dobbins Technical (Philadelphia, Pennsylvania)
- College: USC (1985–1986); Loyola Marymount (1987–1990)
- NBA draft: 1990: 1st round, 8th overall pick
- Drafted by: Los Angeles Clippers
- Playing career: 1990–1998
- Position: Shooting guard
- Number: 30, 16
- Coaching career: 2022–present

Career history

Playing
- 1990–1992: Los Angeles Clippers
- 1992–1993: New York Knicks
- 1993–1994: CRO Lyon
- 1994–1995: Rapid City Thrillers
- 1995: Hartford Hellcats
- 1996–1997: La Crosse Bobcats
- 1997: LUCKIPar
- 1997–1998: Yakima Sun Kings

Coaching
- 2022–present: Overbrook HS

Career highlights
- Consensus second-team All-American (1990); NCAA scoring champion (1990); WCC Player of the Year (1990); 2× First-team All-WCC (1988, 1990); No. 30 retired by Loyola Marymount Lions

Career NBA statistics
- Points: 574 (5.5 ppg)
- Rebounds: 162 (1.5 rpg)
- Stats at NBA.com
- Stats at Basketball Reference

Gregory Kevin "Bo" Kimble (born April 9, 1966) is an American basketball coach and former professional player. He played college basketball for the Loyola Marymount Lions. As a senior in the 1989–90 season, Kimble was named a consensus second-team All-American as well as the conference player of the year in the West Coast Conference (WCC). He led the 11th-seeded Lions to the regional finals of the NCAA tournament after the death of teammate Hank Gathers. Kimble was selected by the Los Angeles Clippers in the first round of the 1990 NBA draft with the eighth overall pick. He played three seasons in the National Basketball Association (NBA) with the Clippers and the New York Knicks.

== High school ==
Kimble played prep ball with Hank Gathers at Dobbins Technical High School in Philadelphia, with the pair leading the team to the Public League City championship in 1985.

== College ==
=== USC ===
Both Gathers and Kimble were recruited to the University of Southern California by head coach Stan Morrison and his top assistant, David Spencer. They were joined by high school All-American, Tom Lewis, and Rich Grande as the "Four Freshmen" star recruiting class. Following an 11–17 season coaching USC, Morrison and Spencer were fired after the 1985–86 season was over, despite winning the Pac-10 the previous year. It was reported that the players would not remain unless certain conditions were met, including having a say in the next coaching staff. USC hired George Raveling as the next head coach of the Trojans. Raveling gave the players a deadline to respond whether they would remain on the team. When they did not respond, he revoked the scholarships of Gathers, Kimble, and Lewis. Raveling's controversial statement was, "You can't let the Indians run the reservation." "You've got to be strong, too. Sometimes you have to tell them that they have to exit," he said. Kimble and Gathers transferred together from USC to Loyola Marymount University (LMU). Lewis transferred to Pepperdine. Grande remained at USC.

=== Loyola Marymount ===
After sitting out the 1986–87 season as required under NCAA rules for transfer students, the pair became the centerpiece of arguably the most entertaining college team in history. The Lions' then-coach Paul Westhead installed an extraordinarily fast-paced game plan. On offense, LMU typically took shots within 10 seconds of gaining possession, with many of the shots being three-pointers. The Lions' defense was a full-court press designed to force opponents into a frenzied up-and-down game. Kimble led the nation in scoring in 1990 averaging 35.3 points per game, and he was also a consensus second team All-American selection that year. Kimble's teams led Division I in scoring in 1988 (110.3 points per game), 1989 (112.5), and 1990 (122.4). LMU's 122.4 point per game in 1990 was still a record as of March 2019. As of October 2010, Loyola Marymount held the five highest combined score games in Division I history. Four of the five occurred during Kimble's career, including a record 331 in the 181–150 win over United States International University on January 31, 1989.

During the 1990 WCC tournament, Gathers collapsed and died of a heart condition in LMU's semifinal against Portland. As a result of Gathers's death, the tournament was suspended, and Loyola Marymount was given the league's automatic bid to the NCAA tournament (as a No. 11 seed) due to their regular season championship. During LMU's subsequent run to the Elite Eight, Kimble (who was right-handed), Gathers' friend and teammate, shot his first free throw of each game left-handed in memory of Gathers (although right-handed, he struggled so much with free throws that he tried shooting them left-handed for a time), making all three attempts (Kimble did not have any free-throw attempts in the Sweet 16 win over Alabama).

Kimble's No. 30 and Gathers's No. 44 were retired by LMU in a joint ceremony in 2000. In 2005, the entire 1989–90 team was inducted into Loyola Marymount's Hall of Fame.

== NBA ==
Later that year, Kimble was selected by the Los Angeles Clippers with the 8th overall pick of the 1990 NBA draft. At the time, the Clippers were playing in the Los Angeles Memorial Sports Arena, the same building that Kimble played in with Gathers while they were at USC. As a rookie, he averaged 6.9 points per game and for his career averaged 5.5 points per game while mostly sitting on the end of the bench. Kimble revealed in 2015 that getting very little playing time despite his ability while the Clippers floundered drove him to consider suicide several times. His NBA career was plagued by injuries. In the summer of 1992, Kimble was traded to the New York Knicks as part of a three-team, six-player deal that brought Mark Jackson to the Clippers. Kimble played only nine games for the Knicks, and was released at the end of the season, bringing his brief NBA career to an end.

Kimble played for several years in the Continental Basketball Association after his NBA career ended. He played for the Rapid City Thrillers, La Crosse Bobcats, Hartford Hellcats and Yakima Sun Kings.

== Coaching career ==
In 2022, Kimble was appointed as head coach of the boys' basketball team at Overbrook High School in Philadelphia. His brother, Jabbar, serves as his assistant coach.

== Personal life ==
He starred in the 1991 movie Heaven is a Playground as fictional high school student Matthew Lockhart. Kimble co-founded and sits on the board of directors of Forty-Four for Life Foundation, a non-profit organization involved in reducing cardiac related fatalities.

Los Angeles County declared July 17, 1990, "Bo Kimble Day" for "not only for his accomplishments on the court, but for providing a positive role model for Los Angeles' youth."

On March 7, 2011, Kimble traveled to Holland, Michigan, to meet with Fennville High School and Lawrence High School's varsity basketball team. Fennville had just lost Wes Leonard, after he collapsed and died moments after hitting the winning shot in the team's 57–55 overtime victory over Bridgman High School. Leonard's death was caused by cardiac arrest due to an enlarged heart.

== Career statistics ==
Legend
GP	Games played	GS	Games started	MPG	Minutes per game
FG%	Field goal percentage	3P%	3-point field goal percentage	FT%	Free throw percentage
RPG	Rebounds per game	APG	Assists per game	SPG	Steals per game
BPG	Blocks per game	PPG	Points per game	**Bold**	Career high

=== NBA ===
==== Regular season ====
Year	Team	GP	GS	MPG	FG%	3P%	FT%	RPG	APG	SPG	BPG	PPG
1990–91	L.A. Clippers	**62**	**22**	**16.2**	.380	.292	**.773**	**1.9**	**1.2**	**.5**	.1	**6.9**
1991–92	L.A. Clippers	34	0	8.1	.396	**.308**	.645	.9	.5	.3	**.2**	**3.3**
1992–93	New York	9	0	6.1	**.424**	.250	.375	1.2	.6	.1	.0	3.7
Career		105	22	12.7	.386	.291	.728	1.5	.9	.4	.1	5.5

==== Playoffs ====
Year	Team	GP	GS	MPG	FG%	3P%	FT%	RPG	APG	SPG	BPG	PPG
1992	L.A. Clippers	3	0	1.7	.000	–	–	.0	.3	.0	.0	.0
