= 1990 NCAA Division I men's basketball championship game =

American college basketball final

1990 NCAA Tournament Championship Game
National championship game
Duke Blue Devils	UNLV Runnin' Rebels
ACC	Big West
(29–8)	(34–5)
73	103
Head coach: Mike Krzyzewski	Head coach: Jerry Tarkanian
- AP: 15
- Coaches: 14
- AP: 2
- Coaches: 2
	1st half	2nd half	Total
Duke Blue Devils	35	38	73
UNLV Runnin' Rebels	47	56	103
- Date: April 2, 1990
- Venue: McNichols Sports Arena, Denver, Colorado
- MVP: Anderson Hunt, UNLV
- Favorite: UNLV by 4.5
- Referees: Ed Hightower, Tim Higgins, Richie Ballesteros
- Attendance: 17,675

United States TV coverage
- Network: CBS
- Announcers: Brent Musburger (play-by-play); Billy Packer (color)

The 1990 NCAA Division I men's basketball championship game was the final round of the 1990 NCAA Division I men's basketball tournament. It determined the national champion for the 1989–90 NCAA Division I men's basketball season, and was contested by the East Regional Champions, No. 3-seeded Duke Blue Devils of the ACC and the West Regional Champions, No. 1-seeded UNLV Runnin' Rebels of the Big West. Both teams were seeking their first national title. The game was played on April 2, 1990, at McNichols Sports Arena in Denver, Colorado. This was the first of three consecutive championship game appearances for Duke.

The Runnin' Rebels defeated the Blue Devils, 103–73, to claim their first (and to date, only) national championship. It was also the first title for head coach Jerry Tarkanian. UNLV guard Anderson Hunt was named the NCAA Tournament Most Outstanding Player (MOP).

The 30-point margin of victory remains the largest in championship game history.

== Participating teams ==
This was the first national championship game between the two schools. Duke was playing in the Final Four for the fourth time in five seasons, and was playing in the championship game for the fourth time (1964, 1978, 1986). UNLV was playing in the championship game for the first time.

=== Duke Blue Devils ===
- East
  - (3) Duke 81, (14) Richmond 46
  - (3) Duke 76, (6) St. Johns 72
  - (3) Duke 90, (7) UCLA 81
  - (3) Duke 79, (1) Connecticut 78
- Final Four
  - (E3) Duke 97, (MW4) Arkansas 83

=== UNLV Runnin’ Rebels ===
- West
  - (1) UNLV 102, (16) Arkansas-Little Rock 72
  - (1) UNLV 76, (8) Ohio State 65
  - (1) UNLV 69, (12) Ball State 67
  - (1) UNLV 131, (11) Loyola Marymount 101
- Final Four
  - (W1) UNLV 90, (SE4) Georgia Tech 81

== Game summary ==
Duke won the jump ball to begin the game and Phil Henderson put up a three-point shot attempt that hit off iron and was rebounded by Stacey Augmon. After the teams traded turnovers, Greg Anthony opened the scoring with a 17-foot jumper from the top of the key. After a low-post bucket by Larry Johnson put the Rebels up 4–0, Duke got on the board with a pair of free throws by Alaa Abdelnaby. UNLV maintained a slight lead for the next few possessions. Around the 17-minute mark, Duke's Robert Brickey scored inside and was fouled for a chance to tie the game at 7 with a free throw. Brickey missed the foul shot and that is as close as the Blue Devils would get for the remainder of the ballgame. UNLV led 11–6 at the under 16 media timeout. Augmon forced Duke's 7th turnover of the half and took it in for the dunk to give UNLV its first double-digit lead at 21–11 at the under 12 timeout. After reserve Barry Young hit a three-point shot to put UNLV up 30–17, analyst Billy Packer said, "Jerry Tarkanian's towel is under is seat. He's gotta be comfortable right now," alluding to significant contributions from the Runnin' Rebels bench players. After a three-point play from Larry Johnson and an alley-oop pass from half court from point guard Anthony to Augmon, UNLV's lead ballooned to 16 at 41–25. Duke would shave a few points off the deficit in the final minutes to make the halftime score 47–35, UNLV. At the break, the Runnin' Rebels held a 17–4 advantage in fast break points.

Duke opened the second half with possession, but failed to score. UNLV drew a third personal foul from Duke's Christian Laettner on the following possession – one that eventually ended with a three-pointer from Larry Johnson and a 50–35 lead. Duke trimmed the lead to 10 with 16:24 remaining, but an Anderson Hunt jumper made the score 59–47 at the under 16 media timeout. The Rebels continued to push the pace as a bucket from Johnson, a three-pointer from Hunt, and a transition layup from Hunt made it 66–47 with 14:49 to go. In between two Duke timeouts, UNLV's devastating run was extended to 18–0, and a 75–47 lead, before Duke's next points. At this point, the Rebels had a 33–6 advantage on the fast break. Johnson, a consensus All-American, ended with 22 points and 11 rebounds, and Tournament MOP Hunt compiled 29 points on 12-16 shooting. UNLV shattered UCLA's championship game margin record from 1968 (23 points) in coasting to the 103–73 victory.

CBS

April 2, 1990

Box score

#E3 Duke Blue Devils 73, #W1 UNLV Runnin' Rebels 103
Scoring by half: 35–47, 38–56
Pts: Phil Henderson 21; Rebs: Christian Laettner 9 Asts: Christian Laettner 5	Pts: Anderson Hunt 29; Rebs: Larry Johnson 11; Asts: Stacey Augmon 7

McNichols Arena - Denver, Colorado
Attendance: 17,675

Starters:			Pts	Reb	Ast
G	3	Phil Henderson	21	2	0
G	11	Bobby Hurley	2	0	3
F	21	Robert Brickey	4	3	2
F	32	Christian Laettner	15	9	5
C	30	Alaa Abdelnaby	14	7	0
Reserves:					
G/F	23	Brian Davis	6	1	0
F	22	Greg Koubek	2	2	0
G	5	Billy McCaffrey	4	2	0
G/F	25	Thomas Hill	0	3	1
F/C	45	Clay Buckley	0	1	0
C	34	Crawford Palmer	3	3	0
G	13	Joe Cook	2	0	0
Head coach:
Mike Krzyzewski

Duke	UNLV

Duke	Statistics	UNLV
26/61 (43%)	Field goals	41/67 (61%)
1/11 (9%)	3-pt. field goals	8/14 (57%)
20/27 (74%)	Free throws	13/17 (77%)
15	Offensive rebounds	9
18	Defensive rebounds	22
33	Total rebounds	31
11	Assists	24
23	Turnovers	17
5	Steals	16
3	Blocks	3
16	Fouls	23

Starters:			Pts	Reb	Ast
G	50	Greg Anthony	13	1	6
G	12	Anderson Hunt	29	2	2
F	32	Stacey Augmon	12	4	7
F	4	Larry Johnson	22	11	2
C	00	David Butler	4	3	3
Reserves:					
F	35	Moses Scurry	5	6	0
F	33	Barry Young	5	0	0
G	5	Stacey Cvijanovich	5	1	2
G	13	Travis Bice	0	0	2
C	34	James Jones	8	2	0
F	53	Chris Jeter	0	0	0
G	30	Dave Rice	0	1	0
Head coach:
Jerry Tarkanian

== Media coverage ==
The championship game was televised in the United States by CBS. Brent Musburger provided play-by-play, while Billy Packer provided color commentary. This was Musburger's last NCAA men's basketball championship broadcast, as he had been fired the previous day by CBS (Musburger would eventually be hired by ABC later in 1990).

== Aftermath ==
After UNLV won the national championship, the team was hit with NCAA sanctions and a postseason ban. However, UNLV's postseason ban was pushed over to the 1992 season, giving the team a chance to defend their title. The Rebels returned to the Final Four the next year with an undefeated 34–0 record and were once again matched up against Duke for the right to advance to the championship game. Duke proceeded to upset the heavily favored Rebels and advance to the title game.

Since the loss to Duke in the 1991 Final Four, the Rebels would only return to the NCAA Tournament eight times, only advancing as far as the Sweet Sixteen in 2007.

After defeating UNLV in the national semifinal, Duke went on to defeat Kansas for their first national title. They would return to the championship game for a third straight time in 1992, where they defeated Michigan to repeat as champions.

== Notables ==
- UNLV's 30-point margin of victory in the championship game is a tournament record.
- UNLV's 103–73 win over Duke marked the first, (and to date, only), time in the history of the tournament that at least 100 points were scored in the championship game.
- To date, UNLV remains the last team from a non-power conference (AAC, ACC, Big East, Big Ten, Big 12, Pac-12, and SEC) to win the national championship; and only the second one since 1977 (Louisville 1986 was the other team).
- The championship game was UNLV's eleventh-consecutive win. They would eventually run the win streak to an astounding 45 games. That is the fourth-longest win streak in NCAA Division 1 basketball history, and the longest win streak since the longest one ever (by UCLA) ended in 1974.
- This was the last championship in either college or professional sports won by a Las Vegas-based team until the Vegas Golden Knights won the Stanley Cup in 2023.
