= 1991 Duke vs. UNLV men's basketball game =

Men's college basketball tournament game

1991 NCAA tournament national semifinal
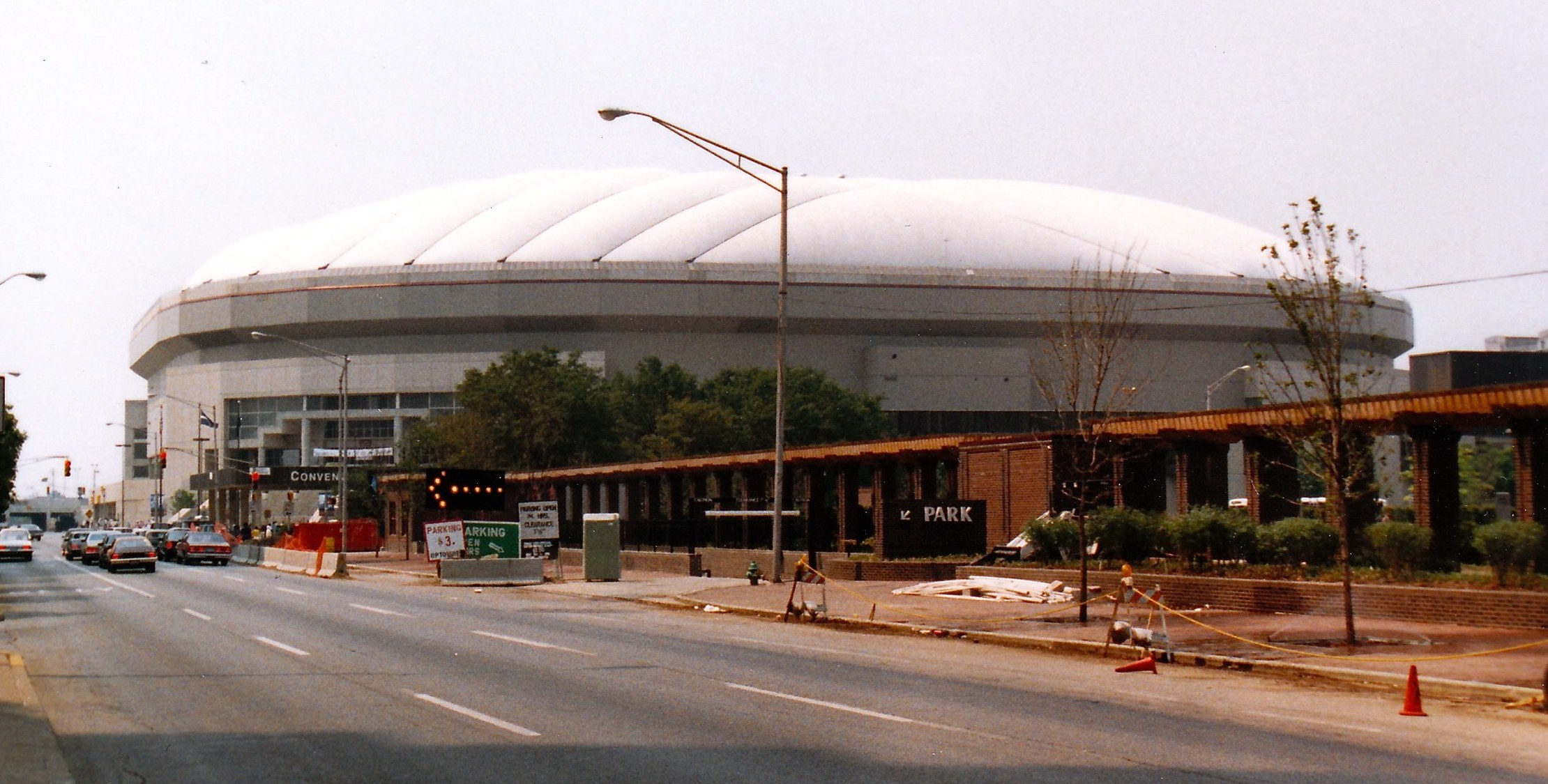
- The Hoosier Dome in 1988
Duke Blue Devils	UNLV Runnin' Rebels
ACC	Big West
(30–7)	(34–0)
79	77
Head coach: Mike Krzyzewski	Head coach: Jerry Tarkanian
- AP: 6
- Coaches: 6
- AP: 1
- Coaches: 1
	1st half	2nd half	Total
Duke Blue Devils	41	38	79
UNLV Runnin' Rebels	43	34	77
- Date: March 30, 1991
- Venue: Hoosier Dome, Indianapolis, Indiana

United States TV coverage
- Network: CBS
- Announcers: Jim Nantz (play by play); Billy Packer (color); Lesley Visser (sideline reporter)

On March 30, 1991, during the national semifinal of the 1991 NCAA Division I men's basketball tournament, the Duke University Blue Devils played a college basketball game against the University of Nevada, Las Vegas (UNLV) Runnin' Rebels at the Hoosier Dome in Indianapolis. The Blue Devils, who were seeded 2nd in the Midwest regional bracket, faced the Runnin' Rebels, who were seeded 1st in the West.

UNLV entered the game on a 45-game winning streak and were strong favorites to win the whole tournament, especially given their 30-point trouncing of Duke in the previous year's championship game. However, Duke managed to scrape out a 79–77 win, advancing them to the championship game which they also won.

The game is frequently recognized as one of the best in the NCAA tournament's history.

== Background ==
Duke entered the NCAA tournament with a 26–7 season record. They were ranked 6th in both major polls, and entered the tournament with an at-large bid. They advanced to the semifinal game with relative ease, defeating Northeast Louisiana, Iowa, Connecticut, and St. John's each by margins of 14 or more points.

UNLV came into the tournament as reigning champions from the previous year, having beaten Duke in the 1990 championship game 103–73 in one of the most lopsided championship games in tournament history. and earned an automatic bid to the tournament by winning the Big West Conference tournament. Coming into the game, the Runnin' Rebels were on a 45-game winning streak that had begun the previous season and were looking to become the first Division I undefeated national champion since Indiana in 1976.

UNLV had come under investigation for violating numerous NCAA regulations and was actually barred from the 1991 NCAA tournament, but a deal was struck where the Runnin' Rebels would be allowed to enter the 1991 tournament but not the 1992 one.

At one of UNLV's final practices before the game, Tarkanian felt the Runnin' Rebels were off their best and told them in a huddle that they would lose because they were not focused.

Before the game, Duke got word of the result from the earlier semifinal: archrival North Carolina had lost to Kansas (coached by the Tar Heels' former assistant and future head coach Roy Williams) 79–73 in what was the first appearance of both halves of the Carolina–Duke rivalry in the Final Four (to date, the two teams had only met once in the postseason in the 1971 NIT and would not meet in the NCAA tournament until the 2022 Final Four). Krzyzewski asked the Duke team if they felt it was okay to lose since that meant they would do no worse than the Tar Heels, and some nodded. Krzyzewski understood but then added, "Flush it. Let's go kick their ass."

== Broadcast ==
The game was broadcast nationally on CBS with Jim Nantz (in his first Final Four) and Billy Packer providing commentary. Lesley Visser served as sideline reporter.

== Route to the game ==
UNLV Runnin' Rebels (West #1)		Round	Duke Blue Devils (Midwest #2)
Opponent	Result	Regionals	Opponent	Result
#16 Montana Grizzlies	Win 99–65	First round	#15 Northeast Louisiana Indians	Win 102–73
#9 Georgetown Hoyas	Win 62–54	Second round	#7 Iowa Hawkeyes	Win 85–70
#4 Utah Utes	Win 83–66	Regional semifinals	#11 Connecticut Huskies	Win 81–67
#3 Seton Hall Pirates	Win 77–65	Regional finals	#4 St. John's Red Storm	Win 78–61

== Starting lineups ==
Duke	Position	UNLV
Thomas Hill	G	Anderson Hunt
Bobby Hurley	G	Greg Anthony 1
Grant Hill	F	† Larry Johnson 1
Greg Koubek	F	Stacey Augmon 1
Christian Laettner	C	George Ackles 2
† 1991 Consensus First Team All-American
Players selected in the 1991 NBA draft (number indicates round)

== Game summary ==
Duke made their first five shots to pull out to an early 13–5 lead. UNLV soon caught up and was leading 43–41 at halftime. Duke kept the game close and held a narrow lead for portions of the second half, and with just under 4 minutes to go, Greg Anthony drove for a layup while on 4 fouls against Brian Davis and was called for charging, which fouled Anthony out of the game and deprived UNLV of their most experienced ball-handler. Despite this, with 2:31 remaining, UNLV took a 76–71 lead via a tip-in by George Ackles to cap a 6–0 run. Bobby Hurley, however, responded quickly with a 3-pointer to bring the Blue Devils back to within 2. After a UNLV shot clock violation, Davis made a driving layup while being fouled by Johnson and proceeded to convert the 3-point play to give Duke a 77–76 lead with 1:02 remaining.

Stacey Augmon then missed a shot, but Larry Johnson was fouled on the offensive rebound by Grant Hill. Johnson missed both free throws initially but made the second after a Thomas Hill lane violation forced a retake, tying the game at 77–77. Thomas Hill then missed a pull-up shot on the next Duke possession, but Christian Laettner was fouled on the rebound by Evric Gray with 12.7 seconds left. The Runnin' Rebels called a timeout, and when Krzyzewski asked Laettner if he had it, Laettner responded, "I got 'em." He then proceeded to make both free throws to put the Blue Devils back ahead 79–77.

On UNLV's final possession, Johnson brought the ball up and considered shooting from the right side over Laettner but passed to Anderson Hunt near the top of the 3-point arc, and Hunt's 3-pointer over Hurley and Laettner missed and was rebounded by Hurley as time expired. Subsequently, Johnson's phone answering machine message included an acknowledgment that he should have taken the last shot.

Duke's going to double-team Hunt on the inbounds play. They're going to let it come in – Anderson to Ackles, now to Johnson, make him bring it up with 9 seconds left. Johnson to the right side, Johnson fakes, looking, five seconds, to Hunt. Anderson Hunt stops, fires a three...no! It's off the mark – It's over! The Blue Devils have pulled off the biggest upset in the history of Duke basketball! The biggest upset in the history of Duke basketball! They have beaten the #1 UNLV Runnin' Rebels 79–77!

(Color commentator Mike Waters: "Let's pass out the Shark meat in Durham!") Holy cow, what a finish!

— Bob Harris on the Duke radio broadcast on the Capitol Sports Network

== Box score ==
CBS

March 30, 1991

box score

#2 Duke Blue Devils 79, #1 UNLV Runnin' Rebels 77
Scoring by half: 41–43, 38–34
Pts: Christian Laettner 28; Rebs: Christian Laettner 7 Asts: Bobby Hurley 7	Pts: Anderson Hunt 29; Rebs: Larry Johnson 13; Asts: Greg Anthony 6

Hoosier Dome, Indianapolis, Indiana

== Aftermath ==
Duke then proceeded to defeat Kansas 72–65 in the championship game, marking the first-ever national championship for both the school and Mike Krzyzewski. The following year, Duke accomplished what they prevented UNLV from doing and repeated as national champions, becoming the first team to do so since UCLA in 1972 and 1973.

Meanwhile, Jerry Tarkanian was forced out as UNLV head coach in 1992 by then–school president Robert Maxson after the Runnin' Rebels won their tenth consecutive Big West Conference regular season title but were barred from returning NCAA tournament by the terms of their probation settlement. In 1998, Tarkanian received a $2.5 million out of court settlement from the NCAA after he had filed a lawsuit for violations stemming from the NCAA investigation of UNLV. In 2005, the basketball court at the Thomas & Mack Center in Las Vegas was renamed Jerry Tarkanian Court.

== Legacy ==
Duke vs. UNLV is often noted as one of the best games in the history of the NCAA tournament. In 2012, Bleacher Report ranked it as the #1 game in tournament history, and in 2020, the Associated Press rated it the tournament's 5th best game. As of the start of the 2022 tournament, Duke's victory against UNLV as a 9.5 point underdog has only been matched once in terms of Final Four underdog victories: by Connecticut's win over Duke in the 1999 national championship game.
