= 1991 NCAA Men's Basketball All-Americans =

- Awarded for: 1990–91 NCAA Division I men's basketball season

The Consensus 1991 College Basketball All-American team, as determined by aggregating the results of four major All-American teams. To earn "consensus" status, a player must win honors from a majority of the following teams: the Associated Press, the USBWA, The United Press International and the National Association of Basketball Coaches.

== 1991 Consensus All-America team ==
Consensus First Team
Player	Position	Class	Team
Kenny Anderson	G	Sophomore	Georgia Tech
Jimmy Jackson	G/F	Sophomore	Ohio State
Larry Johnson	F	Senior	UNLV
Shaquille O'Neal	C	Sophomore	Louisiana State
Billy Owens	F	Junior	Syracuse

Consensus Second Team
Player	Position	Class	Team
Stacey Augmon	F	Senior	UNLV
Keith Jennings	G	Senior	East Tennessee State
Christian Laettner	F	Junior	Duke
Eric Murdock	G	Senior	Providence
Steve Smith	G	Senior	Michigan State

== Individual All-America teams ==
All-America Team
All-America Team	First team		Second team		Third team	
All-America Team	Player	School	Player	School	Player	School
Associated Press	Kenny Anderson	Georgia Tech	Christian Laettner	Duke	Calbert Cheaney	Indiana
Associated Press	Stacey Augmon	UNLV	Jimmy Jackson	Ohio State	Keith Jennings	East Tennessee State
Associated Press	Larry Johnson	UNLV	Todd Day	Arkansas	Rodney Monroe	North Carolina State
Associated Press	Shaquille O'Neal	LSU	Eric Murdock	Providence	Dikembe Mutombo	Georgetown
Associated Press	Billy Owens	Syracuse	Steve Smith	Michigan State	Doug Smith	Missouri
USBWA	Kenny Anderson	Georgia Tech	Christian Laettner	Duke	No third team	
USBWA	Jimmy Jackson	Ohio State	Stacey Augmon	UNLV	No third team	
USBWA	Larry Johnson	UNLV	Calbert Cheaney	Indiana	No third team	
USBWA	Shaquille O'Neal	LSU	Keith Jennings	East Tennessee State	No third team	
USBWA	Billy Owens	Syracuse	Eric Murdock	Providence	No third team	
NABC	Kenny Anderson	Georgia Tech	Christian Laettner	Duke	Calbert Cheaney	Indiana
NABC	Larry Johnson	UNLV	Jimmy Jackson	Ohio State	Chris Corchiani	North Carolina State
NABC	Shaquille O'Neal	LSU	Keith Jennings	East Tennessee State	Todd Day	Arkansas
NABC	Billy Owens	Syracuse	Stacey Augmon	UNLV	Alonzo Mourning	Georgetown
NABC	Steve Smith	Michigan State	Rodney Monroe	North Carolina State	Eric Murdock	Providence
UPI	Kenny Anderson	Georgia Tech	Christian Laettner	Duke	Calbert Cheaney	Indiana
UPI	Jimmy Jackson	Ohio State	Stacey Augmon	UNLV	Keith Jennings	East Tennessee State
UPI	Larry Johnson	UNLV	Rodney Monroe	North Carolina State	Dikembe Mutombo	Georgetown
UPI	Shaquille O'Neal	LSU	Eric Murdock	Providence	Steve Smith	Michigan State
UPI	Billy Owens	Syracuse	Doug Smith	Missouri	Clarence Weatherspoon	Southern Miss

AP Honorable Mention:

- George Ackles, UNLV
- Greg Anthony, UNLV
- Anthony Avent, Seton Hall
- Damon Bailey, Indiana
- Shawn Bradley, Brigham Young
- Kevin Bradshaw, U. S. International
- Terrell Brandon, Oregon
- Kevin Brooks, Southwestern Louisiana
- Marc Brown, Siena
- Greg Carter, Mississippi State
- Chris Corchiani, North Carolina State
- Dale Davis, Clemson
- Rick Fox, North Carolina
- Chris Gatling, Old Dominion
- Josh Grant, Utah
- Litterial Green, Georgia
- Allan Houston, Tennessee
- Byron Houston, Oklahoma State
- Anderson Hunt, UNLV
- Bobby Hurley, Duke
- Popeye Jones, Murray State
- Adam Keefe, Stanford
- Treg Lee, Ohio State
- Luc Longley, New Mexico
- Kevin Lynch, Minnesota
- Don MacLean, UCLA
- Mark Macon, Temple
- Jamal Mashburn, Kentucky
- Lee Mayberry, Arkansas
- Oliver Miller, Arkansas
- Chris Mills, Arizona
- Harold Miner, Southern California
- Alonzo Mourning, Georgetown
- Matt Muehlebach, Arizona
- Tracy Murray, UCLA
- Doug Overton, La Salle
- John Pelphrey, Kentucky
- Mark Randall, Kansas
- James Robinson, Alabama
- Malik Sealy, St. John's
- Chris Smith, Connecticut
- Bryant Stith, Virginia
- Clarence Weatherspoon, Southern Miss
- Brian Williams, Arizona
- Joey Wright, Texas
