= UNLV Runnin' Rebels basketball =

Men's basketball team of UNLV

UNLV Runnin' Rebels
| 2026–27 UNLV Runnin' Rebels basketball team |
- University: University of Nevada, Las Vegas
- Head coach: Josh Pastner (2nd season)
- Location: Paradise, Nevada
- Arena: Thomas & Mack Center (capacity: 17,923)
- Conference: Mountain West
- Nickname: Runnin' Rebels
- Colors: Scarlet and gray

NCAA Division I tournament champions
- 1990
Other NCAA Division I tournament results
| Final Four | 1977, 1987, 1990, 1991 |
| Elite Eight | 1968*, 1977, 1987, 1989, 1990, 1991 |
| Sweet Sixteen | 1967*, 1968*, 1969*, 1975, 1976, 1977, 1984, 1986, 1987, 1989, 1990, 1991, 2007 |
| Appearances | 1965*, 1967*, 1968*, 1969*, 1975, 1976, 1977, 1983, 1984, 1985, 1986, 1987, 1988, 1989, 1990, 1991, 1998, 2000, 2007, 2008, 2010, 2011, 2012, 2013 *at Division II level |

Conference tournament champions
- Big West: 1983, 1985, 1986, 1987, 1989, 1990, 1991; WAC: 1998; Mountain West: 2000, 2007, 2008

Conference regular-season champions
- WCC: 1975; Big West: 1983, 1984, 1985, 1986, 1987, 1988, 1989, 1990, 1991, 1992; Mountain West: 2000

Conference division champions
- WAC Mountain: 1999

Uniforms
| Home | Away | Alternate |

The UNLV Runnin' Rebels are the men's basketball team that represent the University of Nevada, Las Vegas, in the Mountain West Conference of the National Collegiate Athletic Association (NCAA); it plays at the Thomas & Mack Center on campus. As of 2023, UNLV has the seventh-highest winning percentage (.687) in Division I history. UNLV is 33–19 all-time in the NCAA tournament with a 63.5 winning percentage. In July 2008, ESPNU named the program the eighth most prestigious collegiate basketball program in the nation since the 1984–85 season.

== History ==
=== Founding ===
One year after the establishment of Nevada Southern University, the fledgling school began playing basketball at a municipal gym in downtown Las Vegas. The team later moved on campus to the Nevada Southern Gym, which is now the Marjorie Barrick Museum. Most games were against junior colleges or teams fielded by military bases in the Western United States. The school adopted the Rebels mascot to symbolize its independence from the University of Nevada, Reno, 350 miles northwest of Las Vegas, with a scraggly wolf in grey symbolizing the school's contrast from the bow-tied wolf from UNR.

In 1969, UNLV joined the West Coast Athletic Conference, coached by Rolland Todd before he left to helm the expansion Portland Trail Blazers. Todd led the Rebels three straight NCAA playoff appearances. In 1966, the team moved its games to The Rotunda, a silver-domed 6,300-seat arena in the Las Vegas Convention Center. UNLV changed its mascot from the scraggly wolf, which had strong Confederate undertones, to a "mountain man" style mascot resembling Yosemite Sam in 1983 after briefly debating whether to make the mascot the "Minuteman."

=== Jerry Tarkanian era ===
On March 23, 1973, UNLV hired former Long Beach State head coach Jerry Tarkanian to lead the program. Tarkanian's success was immediate and ultimately led him to enshrinement in the Naismith Memorial Basketball Hall of Fame.

In 1977, just seven years after joining Division I, The Rebels made the Final Four with a squad nicknamed the "Hardway Eight". At the Omni Coliseum in Atlanta, UNLV lost 84–83 to North Carolina in the first of four Final Four appearances for the Rebels.

In 1983, UNLV moved to an on-campus arena, the 18,500 seat Thomas & Mack Center. The massive arena, clad with red seats and lined with luxury suites, became famous for its extravagance relative to the rest of college basketball at the time. Games were regularly televised in Nevada and Southern California, with Los Angeles radio icons Chick Hearn and Ross Porter handling play-by-play duties. National TV broadcasts became a regular occurrence. UNLV consistently led the nation in points scored, turnovers forced, and most importantly – wins. The Runnin' Rebels were well known for going on long runs that turned close games into blowouts. They were also known for up-tempo offense and stifling defense.

In 1986, UNLV returned to the Final Four, having gone 37–1 before losing 97–93 to Indiana.

In 1990, UNLV won the NCAA Championship by beating Duke by a record-setting margin of 103–73, becoming the first team and only team to score over 100 points in the championship game. Before becoming a basketball powerhouse in the late 1970s, UNLV was often referred to as "Tumbleweed Tech" due to its relative obscurity.

Tarkanian regularly ran afoul of the NCAA, dating to his time at Long Beach State. He was repeatedly investigated for allegedly offering payments or other benefits to players, allegations he both denied and said were selectively enforced. He told the Los Angeles Times that the NCAA would "get so upset at UCLA, they'll put Northridge on two years probation," implying that the regulating body favored established programs over smaller schools. The NCAA was equally critical of Tarkanian, criticizing him for recruiting student-athletes from urban areas. NCAA executive director Walter Byers said "Tark's black players play a fast city-lot basketball without much style. Grab ball and run like hell, not lots of passing to set up the shots."

In 1990, the NCAA banned UNLV from defending its national title, a decision it later reversed. The 1991 team was 34-0 heading into its Final Four matchup in Indianapolis with Duke, which it had defeated in the title game a year earlier. Duke prevailed 79–77, and UNLV was banned from television and the postseason in 1991–92. Ultimately, in 1992, Tarkanian was forced to resign by UNLV president Robert Maxson. In 1998 Tarkanian received a $2.5 million out of court settlement when he sued the NCAA for violations stemming from its investigation of UNLV. The last Rebel squad coached by Tarkanian won their tenth consecutive Big West Conference regular season title.

On November 26, 2005, for his achievements as coach of the Runnin' Rebels (he was 509–105 in 19 years as head coach), the basketball court at the Thomas & Mack Center was renamed Jerry Tarkanian Court, despite the recruiting sanctions and controversies.

=== Post-Tarkanian struggles ===
The years after Tarkanian's departure were tumultuous. UNLV hired Villanova coach Rollie Massimino to replace Tarkanian, but after two seasons and a 15–13 record in 1993–94, he was let go. There was outrage when it was revealed that Massimino had been awarded a secret contract— a deal that ultimately led to Maxson's departure from UNLV.

Massimino was replaced by well–respected Tarkanian assistant Tim Grgurich, but he lasted just 7 games in 1994 before resigning. Howie Landa and Cleveland Edwards finished the 1994–95 season, which ended with a 12–16 record—the school's first losing season in 34 years, and first since moving up to Division I. The team hired UMass assistant Bill Bayno for the 1995–96 season. With a still-depleted roster, Bayno's first year ended with a 10–16 record, the worst in school history.

However, Bayno engineered a very quick return to respectability. He was an excellent recruiter, bringing in future NBA talent including Shawn Marion, Tyrone Nesby, and Keon Clark. The Rebels returned to the NCAA tournament in 1997, their first appearance in six years. Bayno was let go in 2000, after the NCAA found that UNLV had violated rules while recruiting Lamar Odom, who ultimately chose Rhode Island over UNLV.

It was in the wake of Bayno that UNLV began looking for a well-respected coach to act as an anchor for the program. The school intensely pursued former University of Kentucky and Boston Celtics coach Rick Pitino, who ultimately spurned the university before choosing to work at Louisville. Former Saint Louis University coach Charlie Spoonhour replaced Bayno for the 2001–02 season, compiling a 54–31 record before resigning in the middle of the 2004 season.

=== Lon Kruger era ===
The anchor turned out to be Lon Kruger, who came to Las Vegas after an unsuccessful stint as the coach of the Atlanta Hawks, with successful college stints at Kansas State, Florida and Illinois. Kruger's stint at UNLV began with a mediocre 17–15 record in the 2004–05 season that including seven losses in conference play and a poor start to the 2005–06 season that ultimately finished a respectable 17–13 and a loss in the conference tournament semifinals. Despite being picked to come in sixth in the Mountain West, UNLV started the 2006–07 season 3–0 led by future NBA player Joel Anthony and Lon Kruger's son, Kevin Kruger. Despite losing their next game, UNLV responded by winning a significant road game at Nevada 58–49, ranked No. 20 in the nation at the time, marking the first time since 1991 that UNLV beat a ranked team on the road. After defeating Texas Tech in late December and upsetting a nationally ranked Air Force squad, UNLV received their first national ranking in 14 years. Winning the Mountain West Conference tournament over BYU sealed their bid to the NCAA tournament and UNLV received a No. 7 seed. After narrowly beating Georgia Tech, the Rebels shocked 2nd seeded Wisconsin, sending them to the Sweet Sixteen for the first time in over 15 seasons. However, their magical season came to an end as the Runnin' Rebels ultimately lost to Oregon in the Sweet 16, 76–72. The team finished 14th in the polls with a 30–6 record.

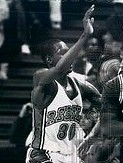
Stacey Augmon along with core players help lead the Rebels to back–to–back NCAA championship game appearances in 1990 and 1991

The next season, 2007–08, despite being picked to finish in fifth Mountain West Conference, UNLV surprised critics by starting the year 12–3. They finished in second place in the conference, with 12–4 record behind BYU. UNLV defeated BYU again to win the 2008 Mountain West tournament. Star guard Wink Adams scored 23 points and was given the MVP title. They received a No. 8 seed in the NCAA Tournament and beat Kent State in the First Round. UNLV lost in the Second Round to Kansas. They finished that season 27–8.

The Rebels started the 2008–09 season 5–0, their best start since 1999. A 73–55 loss to the California Golden Bears and 67–65 loss to Cincinnati the next day marked the first time in over 3 years that the Rebels had lost consecutive games. On December 31, 2008, they beat No. 18 Louisville 56–55, on the road, which was the highest ranked opponent the Rebels have beaten on the road since they beat No. 12 New Mexico in 1991. They also started off the first half of their season 13–2, their best 15 game start since they went 15–0 1991. They fell out in the second half of the season, going 8–7 and finished the regular season with a 21–9 record and 5th in their conference, though they did manage to sweep the season series with BYU and upset Utah at home. They were denied a third consecutive Mountain West Conference tournament Championship when they lost to the rival San Diego State Aztecs 71–57, on March 12, 2009. The Rebels went on to become a No. 5 seed in the 2009 NIT, but suffered a loss against Kentucky in the first round.

Despite losing three starters from the previous era's squad, the Rebels started off strong once again for their 2009–10 campaign with their second consecutive 5–0 start, the first time since 1989–90 and 1990–91 that they have done so. Their victory over No. 16 Louisville was their first home victory against a ranked opponent since 2007 and the highest ranked opponent the Rebels have beaten since defeating the Wisconsin Badgers (ranked 6th in the final AP Poll) in 2007. On November 30, 2009, the Rebels were ranked 24th in the AP Polls and 21st in the USA Today/ESPN Polls, making it the first time the team was ranked since 2007. However, UNLV soon dropped out of the AP Top 25 with losses to Kansas State and USC. In early February, however, UNLV upset a No. 14 and Jimmer Fredette–lead BYU team. As a result, UNLV returned to the national rankings, but after losing their next three, they soon dropped out, though they recovered at the end of the season, and finished 11–5 in MWC play. On March 6, 2010, they ended their 2009–10 campaign with 74–56 win over Wyoming at home. They finished the season 23–7, their best win–loss season since 2007. Despite losing in the finals of the Mountain West tournament the following weekend, UNLV did manage to defeat BYU for the fifth time in six matchups. On March 14, 2010, the Runnin' Rebels returned to the NCAA tournament after missing out in 2009. They finished the season with a 25–9 record, losing in the first round of the NCAA Tournament to Northern Iowa 69–66, thanks to a 3–pointer with under 3 seconds to go by the Panthers.

With all 5 starters back from the 2009–10 season, UNLV entered the 2010–11 season with high expectations. Initially, the Rebels lived up to the hype, starting the year 10–0 and was ranked No. 19 in the polls. However, the team lost their next two games, including one at home and dropped out of the rankings. Although they later went on to upset No. 11 Kansas State in Kansas City, the team never really recovered and lost to BYU at home for the first time since 2005, Kruger's first year at the helm. Like the 2008–09 squad, the Rebels collapsed down the stretch, though the team rallied somewhat towards the very end of the season, losing to a top 10 San Diego State team in a very tight game and defeating two "bubble" teams on the road. After losing to the Aztecs in the conference tournament, the Runnin' Rebels earned their 18th overall NCAA tournament bid and fourth in five seasons, being picked as an 8 seed in the Southwest Regional. After falling to the 9th seeded Illinois Fighting Illini 73–62, their season ended with a record 24–9. On April 1, 2011, Lon Kruger announced that he would be leaving UNLV for the University of Oklahoma.

=== Dave Rice era ===
UNLV soon replaced Kruger with Dave Rice, a little–known assistant at rival BYU. Rice played for the Rebels when they won the 1990 national title, and promised to bring back the up–tempo offense that was a trademark of the team prior to Kruger's hiring. On November 26, 2011, the Rebels upset No. 1 North Carolina at the Orleans Arena in the Las Vegas Invitational, 90–80 to start their season 7–0. It was their third consecutive 7–0 start to a season and was also regarded as Rice's first marquee win as coach. This win placed the UNLV Runnin' Rebels well within the Top 25. Despite losing to Wichita State on the road a little over a week later, UNLV then avenged last years lost to Illinois, which was also ranked in the top 25, in convincing fashion. This victory once again placed UNLV in the rankings. Shortly before Christmas, UNLV faced California, which had been ranked in the Top 25 for much of the beginning of the season, winning 85–68. Thereafter, UNLV dropped 124 points in a lopsided win against an inferior Central Arkansas team.

Despite falling to the SDSU Aztecs in their conference opener in a very close game, the Runnin' Rebels responded with soundly defeating New Mexico, the preseason Mountain West favorite, at home in front of a sold-out crowd as well as blowing out an up–and–coming Colorado State club that easily beat that at UNLV the previous year. Despite narrowly winning road games against Air Force and Boise State, UNLV was ranked No. 11 in the country, which set up for an early February Top 15 showdown against San Diego State, which won 9 of the last 10 meetings. In front of a rejuvenated UNLV student section and a capacity crowd, UNLV played a near–perfect game, only to let up in the closing minutes, but key defensive stops in the final seconds allowed UNLV to come atop 65–63. However, the Rebels blew an 18-point lead in the following game against lowly TCU, and despite scoring 97 points, they lost in overtime. This set up numerous road losses down the stretch, but still finished a respectable 9–5 in conference play and 3rd seed in the tournament, where they lost in the semifinals to New Mexico. Granted a six seed in the 2012 NCAA tournament, the Runnin' Rebels were upset in the opening round to Colorado despite trimming a 21–second point deficit to 2 in a 68–64 loss.

Despite the loss in the tournament and losing three starters, as well as two key reserves from the 2011–12 team, Dave Rice brought a highly touted recruiting class for the 2012–13 season. A total of four ESPN Top 100 players were signed as well as two transfers from key players on Big East schools, highlighted by forward Anthony Bennett. As a result, UNLV was ranked in the Top 20 to start the season for the first time in 22 years, but suffered an early season loss to Oregon over Thanksgiving weekend. However, UNLV rebounded from the loss, though the Rebels did lose a match to UNC. Road struggles from last year continued to follow them, even though the Rebels did beat the Aztecs on the road, Rice's squad was embarrassed by second–to–last place Fresno State on the road. Although they easily defeated a Top 15 New Mexico team, UNLV lost to a lowly Air Force team on the road 72–56, falling to 5–5 in MWC play. However, UNLV recovered the rest of the way, winning their next five, including a come from behind victory over rival SDSU. Yet, the UNLV Rebels were upset once again to Fresno State at home, but responded to avenge the Air Force loss in the Mountain West tourney and advance the title game where they lost to New Mexico. Awarded a five seed, the Rebels faced California in the NCAA Tournament, which they previously defeated in mid–December. In an ugly game, the team fell behind early and went 11 minutes without a basket in the 2nd half en route to a 64–61 loss. In late June, Anthony Bennett was drafted as the top overall pick in the 2013 NBA draft, marking the first time a Rebel was picked No. 1 overall since 1991.

Despite losing Bennett, as well as two other starters, including one who left the program, the Runnin' Rebels were picked to finish in third in 2013–14 in a highly competitive conference. However, the team did not get onto a good start and lost to UC Santa Barbara, which finished 11–20 in one of the worst conferences in the country the previous season, by 21. After losing back to back home games, the Rebels dropped to 2–3, the first time they had a losing record since 2005. They ended up missing the postseason for the first time since 2006. Despite this, Dave Rice received a contract extension through the 2018–19 season.

After going 18–15 in 2014–15, the first time the Rebels failed to win 20 games in a season since 2005–06, the team recruited highly touted prospect Stephen Zimmerman, who helped the Rebels start the 2015–16 season 3–0, their best start since going 8–0 in 2010–11. However, the Rebels failed to capitalize on that start; a 1–5 stretch that included an 0–3 start in Mountain West play led the school to fire Rice on January 10, 2016. His top assistant Todd Simon was named interim head coach for the remainder of the season.

=== Chris Beard's 19-day tenure ===
Fresh off a 30-win season at Arkansas–Little Rock, UNLV hired Chris Beard as a head coach. Beard was Sun Belt Coach of the Year in 2015–16, and led the Trojans to a victory in the 2016 NCAA tournament over Purdue. Nineteen days later, Beard left UNLV to accept the head coaching position at Texas Tech.

=== Marvin Menzies era ===
After Chris Beard's sudden departure, UNLV agreed to hire 2015 Western Athletic Conference Coach of the Year and former New Mexico State head basketball coach, Marvin Menzies. In Menzies first season the 2016–17 Runnin' Rebels reached a new low finishing the season 11–21 and in last place of Mountain West Conference. The following year Menzies landed a top 25 Recruiting class. Landing 5 star prospect Brandon McCoy and the Top Junior college player in the nation, Shakur Juiston. The Rebels started the 2017–18 season 6–0 featuring a win over Utah in the MGM invitational championship game. UNLV had started receiving votes for the top 25. UNLV went on to only suffer 2 losses in non-conference play against northern Iowa and Arizona (both in overtime). UNLV started conference play 11–2 and in 1st place. The Rebels went 8–10 in conference play after losing it last five games. UNLV beat NO.23 Nevada on the road before going on a 5 games losing streak. UNLV was 19–12 going into the Mountain West tournament and beat Air Force 97–90 in the 1st round. They took on NO.22 Nevada in the quarterfinal game and lost 79–74. Ending UNLV's season at 20–13. On March 15, 2019, after finishing the season with a 17–13 record, the UNLV athletic department parted ways with Marvin Menzies after 3 years.

=== T. J. Otzelberger ===
UNLV announced on March 27, 2019, that its new coach would be T. J. Otzelberger, former South Dakota State Jackrabbits head coach who posted an overall record of 70–33 in three season as head coach, including two NCAA Tournament appearances and earning Summit League 2018 Coach of the Year honors.

== NCAA Final Four appearances ==
=== 1976–77 ===
Known as the "Hardway Eight," this was the team that put UNLV on the map as a nationally prominent program. With players such as Lewis Brown, Glen Gondrezick, Larry Moffett, Eddie Owens, Robert Smith, Sam Smith, Tony Smith and Reggie Theus, the Rebels ran themselves to a record of 29–3 and a spot in the 1977 Final Four at the Omni in Atlanta. UNLV's record–setting team established NCAA marks for most points in one season (3,426), most 100-point games (23) and most consecutive 100-point games (12). The Runnin’ Rebels won their first–ever West Regional Championship and advanced to the national semifinals. An 84–83 loss to North Carolina in the semifinals ended the championship dreams, but a 106–94 triumph over North Carolina–Charlotte gave UNLV third place and a positive end to the season. The squad was inducted into the UNLV Athletic Hall of Fame in 1987.

=== 1986–87 ===
The 1986–87 edition of Runnin’ Rebels basketball was a special one as it became the first team to end the regular season as the nation's top–ranked team. Led by Freddie Banks, Jarvis Basnight (pronounced BASE-NITE), Armon Gilliam, Gerald Paddio and Mark Wade, the Rebels ran through the Pacific Coast Athletic Association with a perfect record of 18–0. The team's only regular–season loss came at Oklahoma, 89–88. UNLV entered the NCAA Tournament as the top seed in the West Region, breezing through the first three rounds. The Rebels received a big scare in the regional final when they were forced to overcome an 18-point deficit against a scrappy Iowa squad. The 84–81 triumph earned UNLV a spot in the Final Four at the Superdome in New Orleans. Banks shined in the semi-final matchup with Indiana, connecting on a tournament–record ten 3–pointers, but it was not enough as the Rebels fell to the eventual champions, 97–93. The loss ended UNLV's season with a record of 37–2. The squad was inducted into the UNLV Athletic Hall of Fame in 1998.

=== 1989–90 ===
The season it all came together for the Runnin’ Rebels was 1989–90. Future NBA star Larry Johnson transferred from Odessa College, joining Greg Anthony, Stacey Augmon, David Butler and Anderson Hunt. The Rebels began the season ranked No. 1 in almost every poll and rolled through the competition. UNLV suffered a surprising loss at New Mexico State and finished the season as co–champions of the Big West Conference. However, Johnson and Co. flexed their muscles in the Big West tournament, running away with the title and the No. 1 seed in the West Region. In NCAA Tournament play, the Rebels toughest game came in the third round at Oakland, Calif., when Ball State hung tough before falling 69–67. UNLV also ended Loyola Marymount's Cinderella season with a 131–101 thrashing in the regional final. The win set up a semi-final match with Georgia Tech at McNichols Arena in Denver. Trailing by seven at the half, UNLV rallied for an 89–80 triumph and a date in the championship. The 1990 NCAA Championship was all UNLV as an 18–0 run midway through the second half sent Duke reeling as the Rebels ran up the most lopsided victory in championship history, 103–73. Hunt was named Most Outstanding Player at the Final Four for his performance as the Rebels finished the season 35–5. The squad was inducted into the UNLV Athletic Hall of Fame in 2000.

=== 1990–91 ===
Billed as one of the greatest teams of all time, the 1990–91 squad became the first team in 12 seasons to go undefeated in the regular season (27–0). A perfect record of 18–0 captured the Big West crown and earned the Rebels the No. 1 seed in the West Region. UNLV also flexed its muscles in a 112–105 victory over then–No. 2 Arkansas in Fayetteville. The Rebels rolled through regional play with wins over Montana, Georgetown, Utah and Seton Hall before a showdown with Duke in the Final Four at the Hoosier Dome in Indianapolis. Grant Hill, Bobby Hurley, and Christian Laettner kept the Rebels in check all evening and ended UNLV's dreams of back–to–back championships and the first perfect season since Indiana in 1976. The 79–77 loss ended UNLV's season with a record of 34–1. The team was inducted into the UNLV Athletic Hall of Fame in 2002.

== Rivalries ==
The Rebels have three major rivalries, including the Nevada Wolf Pack, the SDSU Aztecs and an inactive rivalry with the BYU Cougars. UNLV leads the series with Nevada. The Runnin' Rebels lead their all–time conference series with BYU (before their departure from the conference) 19–16 as of the end of the 2010–11 season with back to back wins over BYU in the MWC tournament championship games (07 and 08) and a victory on February 21, 2009, marked the only regular season sweep of the Cougars in the Lon Kruger era. The intensity of the rivalry between SDSU and UNLV grew exponentially during the Lon Kruger and Dave Rice years but has cooled down since Marvin Menzies took over in 2016.

== UNLV head basketball coaches list ==
The Runnin' Rebels program has had 16 head coaches in their history. 14 of the 16 coaches have winning records at UNLV.

Jerry Tarkanian led UNLV to the NCAA Division I tournament Championship in 1990 and the NCAA Regional – NCAA Division I Men's Final Four in 1977, 1987, 1990 and 1991.

Jerry Tarkanian was inducted into the Naismith Basketball Hall of Fame. Rollie Massimino and Lon Kruger are members of the College Basketball Hall of Fame.

== Facilities ==
=== Arenas ===
==== Thomas and Mack Center (since 1983) ====
The Thomas & Mack Center is an 18,000 seat multipurpose arena on the southwest corner of the UNLV campus. The arena, which opened in 1983, is named after prominent Nevada bankers E. Parry Thomas and Jerome Mack, who donated the original fund for the feasibility and land studies. During a game against in–state rival, Nevada, in November 2005, the court at the Thomas & Mack Center was renamed in honor of former head coach Jerry Tarkanian, who posted a 509–105 record in his 19 seasons, including leading UNLV to 11 conference championships, 12 NCAA tournament berths, and a national title in 1990.

Banners hang in the arena rafters all around the arena that honor former Runnin' Rebel greats (including Greg Anthony, Stacey Augmon and Larry Johnson), regular season and conference tournament championships, appearances in NCAA and NIT tournaments, advancements to the NCAA's Sweet Sixteen, Elite Eight and Final Fours, and a prominent banner representing the 1990 National Championship team.

==== T-Mobile Arena (2016–2021) ====
T-Mobile Arena is a multipurpose arena on the Las Vegas Strip that opened in 2016. While the Thomas & Mack Center remains the Runnin' Rebels' primary home arena, they occasionally played at the 18,000-seat T-Mobile Arena. One game against Duke was played in December 2016 and two games were played in November 2017, against Rice and Utah. In December 2018, UNLV defeated BYU 92–90 in overtime on a buzzer beater. Their last games at the arena were in November 2021, when they lost to both No.4 Michigan and Wichita State. The school now plays once a year at Lee's Family Forum.

==== Orleans Arena (2008–2014) ====
Before moving to the MGM Grand Garden Arena and T-Mobile Arena, UNLV previously used the Orleans Arena as a "home" court when the Thomas and Mack wasn't available due to the National Finals Rodeo. UNLV pulled off a notable upset win here against the No. 1 ranked North Carolina Tar Heels in front of a sold-out crowd in November 2011, which resulted in Rebel fans storming the court.

==== Las Vegas Convention Center (1966–1982) ====
In 1966, UNLV moved to the Las Vegas Convention Center near on Paradise Road in Winchester. The Runnin' Rebels would play 16 seasons at the 6,300-seat Convention Center, before moving back on campus to the newly opened Thomas & Mack Center for the 1983–84 season.

==== NSU Gymnasium (1960–1966) ====
The Runnin' Rebels moved to the NSU Gymnasium located on the UNLV campus (then known as Nevada Southern University) for their third season, 1960–61. The Runnin' Rebels would play six seasons at NSU Gymnasium before moving to the Las Vegas Convention Center. The NSU Gymnasium was developed into a natural history museum at UNLV and was renamed in 1989 to honor Marjorie Barrick, a longstanding benefactor of the university. The hardwood basketball court floor is still intact and acts as the floor for the museum.

==== Dula Memorial Gymnasium (1958–60) ====
The first season for the Rebels was 1958–59. Since there were only two buildings on the "campus", the team practiced at a nearby junior high and home games were played at the Dula Memorial Gymnasium (off Bonanza Road) for the first two seasons.

==== Mendenhall Center ====
Announced in March 2010, the Mendenhall Center is a state–of–the–art basketball practice facility attached to the south side of the Cox Pavilion, near the Thomas & Mack Center. The Mendenhall Center has a total of 38,000 square feet (3,500 m^{2}) of space on three levels. Included are two full–sized basketball courts, an academic area and film room, locker rooms, athletic training, strength and conditioning, and equipment areas.

Groundbreaking occurred on October 21, 2010, with a tentative completion date of spring 2011, the facility was unveiled to the team in January 2012. The facility was built entirely through the private sector and, upon completion of construction, was gifted to the university. Several million of the $11.7 million to fund the facility came from Las Vegas Paving CEO Bob Mendenhall.

Aside from the two regulation–sized practice courts, the building features locker rooms for both players and coaches, state–of–the–art strength and conditioning equipment, an academics area, and a team video room along with other amenities. The facility also includes a Hall of Fame at the entrance and a mezzanine that overlooks the practice floors and can be used for receptions.

== Postseason ==
=== NCAA Division I tournament results ===
The Runnin' Rebels have appeared in the NCAA Division I tournament 20 times, with a combined record of 33–19. They were National Champions in 1990.

| Year | Seed | Round | Opponent | Result |
|---|---|---|---|---|
| 1975 | | Round of 32; Sweet Sixteen; Regional 3rd Place | San Diego State #7 Arizona State; Montana | W 90–80; L 81–84; W 75–67 |
| 1976 | | Round of 32; Sweet Sixteen | Boise State #15 Arizona | W 103–78; L 109–114 ^{OT} |
| 1977 | | Round of 32; Sweet Sixteen; Elite Eight; Final Four; National 3rd Place | #8 San Francisco #14 Utah; Idaho State #5 North Carolina #17 UNC-Charlotte | W 121–96; W 88–83; W 107–90; L 83–84; W 106–94 |
| 1983 | 3 W | Round of 48; Round of 32 | Bye (6) #16 NC State | — L 70–71 |
| 1984 | 5 W | Round of 48; Round of 32; Sweet Sixteen | (12) Princeton (4) #9 UTEP (1) #2 Georgetown | W 68–56; W 73–60; L 48–62 |
| 1985 | 4 W | Round of 64; Round of 32 | (13) San Diego State (12) Kentucky | W 85–80; L 61–64 |
| 1986 | 4 W | Round of 64; Round of 32; Sweet Sixteen | (13) Northeast Louisiana (5) Maryland (8) Auburn | W 74–51; W 70–64; L 63–70 |
| 1987 | 1 W | Round of 64; Round of 32; Sweet Sixteen; Elite Eight; Final Four | (16) Idaho State (9) Kansas State (12) Wyoming (2) #6 Iowa (1) #3 Indiana | W 95–70; W 80–61; W 92–78; W 84–81; L 93–97 |
| 1988 | 4 W | Round of 64; Round of 32 | (12) SW Missouri State (5) #17 Iowa | W 54–50; L 86–104 |
| 1989 | 4 W | Round of 64; Round of 32; Sweet Sixteen; Elite Eight | (13) Idaho (12) DePaul (1) #1 Arizona (3) #11 Seton Hall | W 68–56; W 85–70; W 68–67; L 61–84 |
| 1990 | 1 W | Round of 64; Round of 32; Sweet Sixteen; Elite Eight; Final Four; National Championship | (16) Arkansas–Little Rock (8) Ohio State (12) Ball State (11) #21 Loyola Marymount (4) #9 Georgia Tech (3) #15 Duke | W 102–72; W 76–65; W 69–67; W 131–101; W 90–81; W 103–73 |
| 1991 | 1 W | Round of 64; Round of 32; Sweet Sixteen; Elite Eight; Final Four | (16) Montana (8) Georgetown (4) #10 Utah (3) #13 Seton Hall (2) #6 Duke | W 99–65; W 62–54; W 83–66; W 77–65; L 77–79 |
| 1998 | 12 E | Round of 64 | (5) #8 Princeton | L 57–69 |
| 2000 | 10 S | Round of 64 | (7) #18 Tulsa | L 62–89 |
| 2007 | 7 M | Round of 64; Round of 32; Sweet Sixteen | (10) Georgia Tech (2) #6 Wisconsin (3) #10 Oregon | W 67–63; W 74–68; L 72–76 |
| 2008 | 8 M | Round of 64; Round of 32 | (9) Kent State (1) #4 Kansas | W 71–58; L 56–75 |
| 2010 | 8 M | Round of 64 | (9) Northern Iowa | L 66–69 |
| 2011 | 8 S | Round of 64 | (9) Illinois | L 62–73 |
| 2012 | 6 S | Round of 64 | (11) Colorado | L 64–68 |
| 2013 | 5 E | Round of 64 | (12) California | L 61–64 |

=== NCAA Division II tournament results ===
The Runnin' Rebels appeared in the NCAA Division II tournament four times, with a combined record of 4–5.

| Year | Round | Opponent | Result |
|---|---|---|---|
| 1965 | Regional Semifinals; Regional Third Place | Fresno State; San Francisco State | L 61–74; L 78–85 |
| 1967 | Regional Semifinals; Regional Finals | UC Davis; San Diego State | W 100–83; L 71–88 |
| 1968 | Regional Semifinals; Regional Finals; Elite Eight | UC Davis; UC Irvine; Indiana State | W 96–91; W 79–74; L 75–94 |
| 1969 | Regional Semifinals; Regional Finals | UC Davis; San Francisco State | W 84–81; L 72–77 |

=== NIT results ===
The Runnin' Rebels have appeared in the National Invitation Tournament (NIT) 11 times, with a combined record of 10–12.

| Year | Round | Opponent | Result |
|---|---|---|---|
| 1980 | First round Second Round; Quarterfinals; Semifinals; 3rd Place Game | Washington; Long Beach State; Saint Peter's; Virginia; Illinois | W 93–73; W 90–81; W 67–63; L 71–90; L 74–84 |
| 1982 | First round Second Round | Murray State; Tulane | W 87–61; L 51–56 |
| 1993 | First round | USC | L 73–90 |
| 1997 | First round Second Round; Quarterfinals | Memphis State; Hawaii; Arkansas | W 66–62; W 89–80; L 73–86 |
| 1999 | First round | Nebraska | L 53–68 |
| 2002 | First round Second Round | Arizona State; South Carolina | W 96–91; L 65–75 |
| 2003 | First round | Hawaii | L 68–85 |
| 2004 | Opening Round | Boise State | L 69–84 |
| 2005 | First round Second Round | Arizona State; South Carolina | W 89–78; L 66–77 |
| 2009 | First round | Kentucky | L 60–70 |
| 2024 | First round Second Round; Quarterfinals | Princeton; Boston College; Seton Hall | W 84–77; W 79–70; L 68–91 |

== Retired jerseys ==
UNLV has retired ten players' jerseys to date, the three latest being Robert Smith's number 10 in 2022, Freddie Banks's number 13 in 2021 and Eddie Owens' number 11 in 2016. Although the jerseys are hanging on the rafters, numbers are not officially retired and can be worn by future players.

UNLV announced that they would retire Anderson Hunt's number 12 jersey on November 11, 2023.

UNLV Rebels retired jerseys
| No. | Player | Pos. | Career |
| 4 | Larry Johnson | PF | 1989–1991 |
| 10 | Robert Smith | PG | 1974–1977 |
| 11 | Eddie Owens | SF | 1973–1977 |
| 12 | Anderson Hunt | SG | 1988–1991 |
| 13 | Freddie Banks | SG | 1983–1987 |
| 21 | Sidney Green | PF | 1979–1983 |
| 23 | Reggie Theus | SG | 1975–1978 |
| 25 | Glen Gondrezick | SF | 1973–1977 |
| 32 | Stacey Augmon | SF | 1987–1991 |
| 35 | Armon Gilliam | PF | 1984–1987 |
| 40 | Ricky Sobers | PG | 1971–1975 |
| 50 | Greg Anthony | PG | 1988–1991 |

== UNLV basketball alumni ==
Notable UNLV Runnin' Rebels basketball players
| Player | Born–Died | Notes |
|---|---|---|
| George Ackles | | Former international player and veteran of American minor leagues |
| Louis Amundson | | Former NBA basketball player |
| Greg Anthony | | Former NBA basketball player |
| Joel Anthony | | Former NBA basketball player and NBA champion with the Miami Heat |
| Stacey Augmon | | Former NBA basketball player |
| Marcus Banks | | Former NBA and international basketball player |
| Romel Beck | | Veteran of international leagues and the NBDL |
| Oscar Bellfield | | Veteran of the NBDL, currently with Panteras de Miranda |
| Anthony Bennett | | Former NBA basketball player and number one overall 2013 NBA draft pick, currently with Hsinchu Lioneers |
| Miki Berkovich | 1954– | Israeli former International. Named one of 50 Greatest EuroLeague Contributors (2008) |
| Khem Birch | | NBA basketball player with the San Antonio Spurs |
| David Butler | 1966– | Former international player and veteran of American minor leagues |
| Ben Carter | 1994– | American-Israeli basketball player in the Israel Basketball Premier League |
| Keon Clark | 1975– | Former NBA basketball player |
| Kris Clyburn | 1996– | basketball player for BCM Gravelines-Dunkerque of the French LNB Pro A |
| Bryce Dejean-Jones | 1992–2016 | NBA player with the New Orleans Pelicans who died in 2016 |
| Mark Dickel | | Veteran of several international leagues |
| Gaston Essengué | | Veteran of international and American minor leagues |
| John Flowers | | Veteran of several international leagues |
| Armon Gilliam | | Former NBA player. Drafted 1st round No. 2 overall in the 1987 NBA draft by the Phoenix Suns. |
| Glen Gondrezick | | Former NBA basketball player with the New York Knicks and Denver Nuggets. Nicknamed "Gondo", he also served as a sports broadcaster for the Rebels (1992–2004) along with having his jersey retired in 1997 |
| Evric Gray | | Former NBA and international player |
| Sidney Green | 1961– | Former NBA player |
| Anderson Hunt | | Former international player and veteran of American minor leagues |
| Larry Johnson | 1969– | Former NBA basketball player for the Charlotte Hornets and New York Knicks. He was selected first overall in the 1991 NBA Draft by the Charlotte Hornets and quickly established himself as one of the league's premier power forwards. He was named the NBA Rookie of the Year in 1992 and earned two NBA All-Star selections during his career. |
| Derrick Jones Jr. | 1997– | NBA basketball player with the Dallas Mavericks. Also played for the Phoenix Suns and Miami Heat and won the 2020 NBA All Star Dunk Contest. |
| Kaspars Kambala | | Veteran of several international leagues |
| Kevin Kruger | | Veteran of international leagues and NBA Development League and former head coach of UNLV Runnin' Rebels. |
| Shawn Marion | | Former NBA basketball player with the Phoenix Suns, Dallas Mavericks, and Cleveland Cavaliers |
| Patrick McCaw | 1995– | Former NBA player who also played for the Delaware Blue Coats. He played for the Golden State Warriors, Cleveland Cavaliers and Toronto Raptors and is the only player in NBA history to win three consecutive NBA championships with three different franchises during his first three seasons in the league. |
| Brandon McCoy | | Undrafted player most recently in the NBA G League with the Sioux Falls Skyforce. |
| Elijah Mitrou-Long | 1996– | Canadian-Greek basketball player for Hapoel Holon of the Israeli Basketball Premier League |
| Tyrone Nesby | | Former NBA basketball player |
| Isaiah Rider | | Former NBA basketball player |
| René Rougeau | | Veteran of international and American minor leagues |
| Moses Scurry | | Former international player and veteran of American minor leagues |
| Rashad Vaughn | 1996– | Drafted in the first round (#17) in 2015 by the Milwaukee Bucks. Currently playing in the NBA G League with the Cleveland Charge |
| H Waldman | 1972– | American-Israeli former basketball player |
| Wendell White | | Veteran of international leagues and the NBDL, last with San-en NeoPhoenix. In 2009, White joined the San-en NeoPhoenix of Japan's bj League. He was named the league's Most Valuable Player (MVP) for the 2009–10 season and played a key role in leading San-en NeoPhoenix to the league championship. He later played for the Kyoto Hannaryz and Oita HeatDevils before returning to San-en NeoPhoenix. In 2013, he signed with the Sendai 89ers. During the 2015–16 season, White earned his second league MVP award. |
| Donovan Williams | | NBA basketball player most recently with the Atlanta Hawks |
| Christian Wood | | NBA basketball player with the Los Angeles Lakers |
| Stephen Zimmerman | | Drafted in the second round (#41) in 2016 by the Orlando Magic. Currently playing for Taipei Fubon Braves of the Taiwanese P. League+ |
