= Scurry =

Scurry may refer to:

== People ==
- Briana Scurry (b. 1971), American soccer player
- Carey Scurry (b. 1962), American basketball player
- James Scurry (1766–1822), English soldier and memoirist
- Moses Scurry (b. 1968), American basketball player
- Richardson A. Scurry (1811–1862), American politician
- Rod Scurry (1956–1992), American baseball player
- William Scurry (1895–1962), Australian soldier
- William Read Scurry (1821–1864), Confederate general in the American Civil War

== Places ==
- Scurry, Texas, U.S.
- Scurry County, Texas, U.S.

== Other ==
- Holden Scurry, an alternate name of the Suzuki Carry
- Scurry driving, an equestrian sport
- Scurry Gold Cup, a greyhound race in England
- Scurry Stakes, a flat horse race in England
- USS Scurry (AM-304), a minesweeper
- Scurry, a webcomic by Mac Smith
