= 1991 NCAA Division I men's basketball championship game =

American college basketball final

1991 NCAA tournament championship game
National championship game
Kansas Jayhawks	Duke Blue Devils
Big Eight	ACC
(27–7)	(31–7)
65	72
Head coach: Roy Williams	Head coach: Mike Krzyzewski
- AP: 12
- Coaches: 12
- AP: 6
- Coaches: 6
	1st half	2nd half	Total
Kansas Jayhawks	34	31	65
Duke Blue Devils	42	30	72
- Date: April 1, 1991
- Venue: Hoosier Dome, Indianapolis, Indiana
- MVP: Christian Laettner, Duke
- Favorite: Duke by 3.5

United States TV coverage
- Network: CBS
- Announcers: Jim Nantz (play-by-play); Billy Packer (color)

The 1991 NCAA Division I men's basketball championship game was the finals of the 1991 NCAA Division I men's basketball tournament and it determined the national champion for the 1990–91 NCAA Division I men's basketball season. The game was played on April 1, 1991, at the Hoosier Dome in Indianapolis, Indiana, and featured the Midwest Regional Champion, #2-seeded Duke versus the Southeast Regional Champion, #3-seeded Kansas.

== Participating teams ==
=== Kansas Jayhawks ===
- Southeast
  - (3) Kansas (3) 55, (14) New Orleans 49
  - (3) Kansas 77, (6) Pittsburgh 66
  - (3) Kansas 83, (2) Indiana 65
  - (3) Kansas 93, (1) Arkansas 81
- Final Four
  - (SE3) Kansas 79, (E1) North Carolina 73

=== Duke Blue Devils ===
- Midwest
  - (2) Duke 102, (15) Northeast Louisiana 73
  - (2) Duke 85, (7) Iowa 70
  - (2) Duke 81, (6) Connecticut 67
  - (2) Duke 78, (4) St. John's 61
- Final Four
  - (MW2) Duke 79, (W1) UNLV 77

== Starting lineups ==
Duke	Position	Kansas
Thomas Hill	G	Terry Brown
Bobby Hurley	G	Adonis Jordan
Grant Hill	F	Alonzo Jamison
Greg Koubek	F	Mike Maddox
Christian Laettner	C	Mark Randall

== Game summary ==
April 1, 1991

#SE3 Kansas Jayhawks 65, #MW2 Duke Blue Devils 72
Scoring by half: 34–42, 31–30
Pts: Mark Randall 18; Rebs: Mark Randall 10; Asts: Alonzo Jamison 5	Pts: Christian Laettner 18; Rebs: Christian Laettner 10; Asts: Bobby Hurley 9

Hoosier Dome, Indianapolis

== Media coverage ==
The championship game was televised in the United States by CBS. Jim Nantz provided play-by-play, while Billy Packer provided color commentary. This was the first of 32 consecutive national championship games called by Nantz.
