= Stacey Augmon =

American basketball player and coach (born 1968)

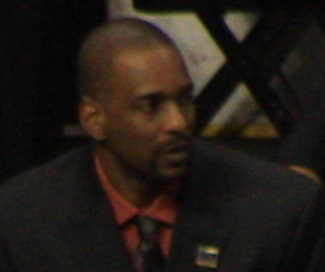
- Augmon in 2009

UNLV Men's Basketball Team
- Title: Director of Community Engagement
- League: NCAA

Personal information
- Born: August 1, 1968 (age 58) Pasadena, California, U.S.
- Listed height: 6 ft 8 in (2.03 m)
- Listed weight: 213 lb (97 kg)

Career information
- High school: John Muir (Pasadena, California)
- College: UNLV (1987–1991)
- NBA draft: 1991: 1st round, 9th overall pick
- Drafted by: Atlanta Hawks
- Playing career: 1991–2006
- Position: Small forward / shooting guard
- Number: 2
- Coaching career: 2007–present

Career history

Playing
- 1991–1996: Atlanta Hawks
- 1996–1997: Detroit Pistons
- 1997–2001: Portland Trail Blazers
- 2001–2002: Charlotte Hornets
- 2002–2004: New Orleans Hornets
- 2004–2006: Orlando Magic

Coaching
- 2007–2011: Denver Nuggets (assistant)
- 2011–2016: UNLV (assistant)
- 2016–2018: Milwaukee Bucks (assistant)
- 2018: Jeonju KCC Egis (assistant)
- 2018–2019: Jeonju KCC Egis
- 2019–present: Sacramento Kings (player development)

Career highlights
- NBA All-Rookie First Team (1992); NCAA champion (1990); Consensus second-team All-American (1991); 3× NABC Defensive Player of the Year (1989–1991); Big West Player of the Year (1989); 2× First-team All-Big West (1989, 1991); No. 32 retired by UNLV Runnin' Rebels

Career statistics
- Points: 7,990 (8.0 ppg)
- Rebounds: 3,216 (3.2 rpg)
- Steals: 974 (1.0 spg)
- Stats at NBA.com
- Stats at Basketball Reference
Medals
Men's basketball
Representing United States
Summer Olympics
Bronze medal – third place	1988 Seoul	National team
FIBA U19 World Championship
Silver medal – second place	1987 Bormio	National team
Summer Universiade
Gold medal – first place	1989 Duisburg	National team

Stacey Orlando Augmon (born August 1, 1968) is an American basketball coach and former player. He serves as the player development coach of the Sacramento Kings. He played professionally in the National Basketball Association (NBA). He gained the nickname "Plastic Man" due to his athletic ability to contort his body. Augmon played college basketball for the UNLV Runnin' Rebels. He was also an assistant coach at his alma mater, UNLV, under coach Dave Rice. He was previously the head coach of Jeonju KCC Egis of the Korean Basketball League. Currently. he serves as the Director for Community Engagement of the UNLV Runnin' Rebels.

== College ==
Augmon played college basketball for four years at UNLV under Coach Jerry Tarkanian. During his junior year, the Runnin' Rebels won the 1990 NCAA Championship defeating the Duke Blue Devils. Augmon was the first three-time winner of the NABC Defensive Player of the Year, winning the award in 1989, 1990, and 1991. He is a class of 2002 member of the UNLV Athletic Hall of Fame along with teammates Greg Anthony and Larry Johnson. In March 2011, HBO premiered a documentary entitled Runnin' Rebels of UNLV.

=== College Statistics ===
Legend
GP	Games played	GS	Games started	MPG	Minutes per game
FG%	Field goal percentage	3P%	3-point field goal percentage	FT%	Free throw percentage
RPG	Rebounds per game	APG	Assists per game	SPG	Steals per game
BPG	Blocks per game	PPG	Points per game	**Bold**	Career high

Year	Team	GP	GS	MPG	FG%	3P%	FT%	RPG	APG	SPG	BPG	PPG
1987–88	UNLV	34	-	26.0	.574	**1.000**	.647	6.1	1.9	2.0	0.7	9.1
1988–89	UNLV	37	**36**	29.5	.519	.418	.663	**7.4**	2.7	1.6	0.7	15.3
1989–90	UNLV	**39**	-	**31.9**	.553	.320	.670	6.9	**3.7**	1.8	**1.3**	14.2
1990–91	UNLV	35	-	30.3	**.587**	.469	**.727**	7.3	3.6	**2.2**	0.8	**16.5**
Career		145	36	29.5	.555	.420	.677	6.9	3.0	1.9	0.9	13.9

== NBA career ==
Augmon was drafted by the Atlanta Hawks with the ninth pick of the 1991 NBA draft. He was the first player in the top ten draft picks to work out a deal, a 5-year contract worth between 6.5 and 7 million dollars. On January 3, 1995, Augmon scored a career-high 36 points during a 103–98 Hawks loss to the Trail Blazers. In total, Augmon played for the Hawks, the Detroit Pistons, the Portland Trail Blazers, the Charlotte Hornets, the New Orleans Hornets, and the Orlando Magic. He holds a scoring average of 8.0 points per game throughout his career.

The Magic decided not to re-sign Augmon for the 2006–07 NBA season, making him an unrestricted free agent. On October 3, 2007, the Denver Nuggets announced the signing of the 15-year veteran, but he was later waived on the 24th. One month and three days later, Denver re-hired Augmon, this time as a player development coach.

== Post-playing career ==
Augmon is from Pasadena, CA and is the president of a bike club. In May 2011, he left the Denver Nuggets to join the staff of former Rebels teammate Dave Rice as an assistant coach for UNLV. In Sept 2016, he was named an assistant coach for the Milwaukee Bucks.

Augmon served as the head coach for Jeonju KCC Egis of the Korean Basketball League during the 2018–19 season leading the team to the KBL Semi-Finals and a 32–30 record.

== NBA career statistics ==
Legend
GP	Games played	GS	Games started	MPG	Minutes per game
FG%	Field goal percentage	3P%	3-point field goal percentage	FT%	Free throw percentage
RPG	Rebounds per game	APG	Assists per game	SPG	Steals per game
BPG	Blocks per game	PPG	Points per game	**Bold**	Career high
*	Led the league

=== Regular season ===
Year	Team	GP	GS	MPG	FG%	3P%	FT%	RPG	APG	SPG	BPG	PPG
1991–92	Atlanta	**82**	**82**	30.5	.489	.167	.666	**5.1**	2.5	1.5	.3	13.3
1992–93	Atlanta	73	66	28.9	.501	.000	.739	3.9	2.3	1.2	.2	14.0
1993–94	Atlanta	**82***	**82***	**31.8**	**.510**	.143	.764	4.8	2.3	**1.8**	.6	**14.8**
1994–95	Atlanta	76	76	31.1	.453	**.269**	.728	4.8	**2.6**	1.3	**.6**	13.9
1995–96	Atlanta	77	49	29.8	.491	.250	**.792**	3.9	1.8	1.4	.4	12.7
1996–97	Detroit	20	3	14.6	.403	.000	.683	2.5	.8	.5	.5	4.5
1996–97	Portland	40	7	16.3	.517	.000	.732	2.2	1.0	.8	.2	4.7
1997–98	Portland	71	23	20.4	.414	.143	.603	3.3	1.2	.8	.4	5.7
1998–99	Portland	48	21	18.2	.448	.000	.684	2.6	1.2	1.2	.4	4.3
1999–00	Portland	59	0	11.7	.474	.000	.673	2.0	.9	.5	.2	3.4
2000–01	Portland	66	23	17.9	.477	.000	.655	2.4	1.5	.7	.3	4.7
2001–02	Charlotte	77	3	17.1	.427	.000	.762	2.9	1.3	.7	.2	4.6
2002–03	New Orleans	70	3	12.3	.411	.000	.750	1.7	1.0	.4	.1	3.0
2003–04	New Orleans	69	24	20.5	.412	.143	.791	2.5	1.2	.8	.2	5.8
2004–05	Orlando	55	7	12.1	.407	.000	.740	1.8	.7	.4	.2	3.5
2005–06	Orlando	36	3	10.7	.342	.000	.700	1.5	.6	.3	.2	2.0
Career		1001	472	21.6	.469	.152	.728	3.2	1.6	1.0	.3	8.0

=== Playoffs ===
Year	Team	GP	GS	MPG	FG%	3P%	FT%	RPG	APG	SPG	BPG	PPG
1993	Atlanta	3	3	31.0	.452	.000	.667	2.7	1.7	**1.3**	.0	**12.0**
1994	Atlanta	11	11	29.5	**.517**	.000	.711	2.6	2.5	.6	.2	10.8
1995	Atlanta	3	1	17.3	.429	.000	.750	2.3	1.7	1.0	.0	7.0
1996	Atlanta	10	10	**31.4**	.486	.000	.825	**3.6**	**2.7**	1.1	**.6**	10.3
1998	Portland	4	0	7.0	.500	.000	.500	.8	.3	.5	.2	1.3
1999	Portland	**13**	0	13.5	.357	.000	.833	2.5	.4	.6	.2	2.7
2000	Portland	7	0	4.9	.333	.000	.500	.3	.0	.0	.0	1.3
2001	Portland	2	0	14.0	.400	.000	**1.000**	2.0	2.0	.5	.0	5.0
2002	Charlotte	9	0	16.9	.390	.000	.762	3.0	1.4	1.1	.1	5.3
2003	New Orleans	4	0	17.3	.333	.000	.875	2.5	.8	.8	.0	4.3
2004	New Orleans	7	0	24.0	.375	.000	.889	2.7	1.0	.9	.1	7.4
Career		77	25	19.1	.438	.000	.780	2.3	1.3	.7	.2	6.0

== See also ==
- List of NCAA Division I men's basketball players with 2,000 points and 1,000 rebounds
