= David Butler (basketball, born 1966) =

American basketball player (born 1966)

Personal information
- Born: October 31, 1966 (age 60) Washington, D.C., U.S.
- Listed height: 6 ft 9 in (2.06 m)
- Listed weight: 230 lb (104 kg)

Career information
- High school: Calvin Coolidge (Washington, D.C.)
- College: San Jacinto CC (1986–1988); UNLV (1988–1990)
- NBA draft: 1990: undrafted
- Playing career: 1990–2001
- Position: Power forward / center

Career history
- 1990–1991: Filodoro Napoli
- 1991–1992: Paşabahçe
- 1992: Iraklis Thessaloniki B.C.
- 1992–1993: Galatasaray
- 1993–1994: Columbus Horizon
- 1994–1995: CB Peñas Huesca
- 1995–1996: Oyak Renault
- 1996–1997: Achilleas
- 1997–1998: Mayagüez
- 1999–2000: Achilleas
- 2000–2001: Keravnos B.C.

Career highlights
- NCAA champion (1990); Third-team Parade All-American (1985)

David Butler (born October 31, 1966) is an American former professional basketball player. He won an NCAA championship as a senior at the University of Nevada, Las Vegas (UNLV) and played professionally in several countries, including a stint with Liga ACB in Spain.

Butler, a post player from Calvin Coolidge High School in Washington, D. C., attended San Jacinto Junior College where he was a National Junior College Athletic Association (NJCAA) All-American in 1988. He was recruited to UNLV by coach Jerry Tarkanian and was a starter on the Rebels' 1990 NCAA championship team as a senior. Butler scored 1,073 points (15.6 points per game) in his two-year Rebel career.

Following the completion of his college career, Butler was not selected in the 1990 NBA draft. He played professionally in Italy, Turkey, Spain, Cyprus, Puerto Rico and Greece. He also had a stint with the Columbus Horizon of the Continental Basketball Association.
