= Anderson Hunt =

American basketball player (born 1969)

Personal information
- Born: May 5, 1969 (age 57) Detroit, Michigan, U.S.
- Listed height: 6 ft 1 in (1.85 m)
- Listed weight: 190 lb (86 kg)

Career information
- High school: Southwestern (Detroit, Michigan)
- College: UNLV (1988–1991)
- NBA draft: 1991: undrafted
- Position: Shooting guard

Career highlights
- NCAA champion (1990); NCAA Final Four Most Outstanding Player (1990); First-team All-Big West (1991); No. 12 retired by UNLV Runnin' Rebels

Anderson Hunt (born May 5, 1969) is an American former basketball player.

== NCAA career ==
Hunt is best known as a member of the successful 1989–91 Runnin' Rebels from the University of Nevada-Las Vegas (UNLV) that made back-to-back Final Four appearances, including a national championship in 1989–90 in which he contributed 29 points in a 103–73 rout of the Blue Devils of Duke University and was named Most Outstanding Player of the tournament. In May 1991, the Las Vegas Review-Journal published photos of Hunt with teammates David Butler and Moses Scurry in a hot tub with known sports fixer Richard Perry, igniting a monumental firestorm between coach Jerry Tarkanian, UNLV president Robert Maxson, and the NCAA. This battle would eventually lead to Tarkanian's resignation at the end of the 1991–92 season. Hunt left school as a junior after the 1991 season to enter the NBA Draft, much to the dismay of his coach, who had hoped to convert him to point guard and make him the centerpiece of the team in the 1991–92 season.

== Professional career ==
Despite his solid college resume, Hunt was not selected in the 1991 NBA draft. The La Crosse Catbirds selected him in the second round of that year's Continental Basketball Association (CBA) draft with the 25th overall pick. He played 42 total CBA games over three seasons with the Sioux Falls Skyforce, Fort Wayne Fury, and Quad City Thunder, averaging 11 points per game for his CBA career.

Hunt also played professionally in Turkey, Poland, and France.

== Legal troubles ==
In October 1993, Hunt was arrested for marijuana possession in connection with a traffic stop and later pleaded guilty to misdemeanor charges. In 2002, he again ran into legal trouble, facing charges of attempted embezzlement after he failed to return a rental car for an extended period of time. He was ordered to pay $1,300 in restitution and placed on probation.

== After basketball ==
After his retirement, Hunt worked at the Imperial Palace Hotel and Casino in Las Vegas. He is now with a youth basketball program sponsored by 4POINT4 Sports.

UNLV retired Hunt's number 12 jersey on November 11, 2023.
