= Mark Randall (basketball) =

American basketball player (born 1967)

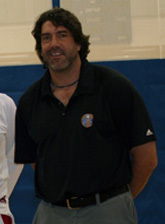
- Randall in 2008

Personal information
- Born: September 30, 1967 (age 59) Edina, Minnesota, U.S.
- Listed height: 6 ft 8 in (2.03 m)
- Listed weight: 235 lb (107 kg)

Career information
- High school: Cherry Creek (Denver, Colorado)
- College: Kansas (1986–1991)
- NBA draft: 1991: 1st round, 26th overall pick
- Drafted by: Chicago Bulls
- Playing career: 1991–1997
- Position: Power forward
- Number: 52, 42

Career history
- 1991: Chicago Bulls
- 1992: Minnesota Timberwolves
- 1992–1993: Detroit Pistons
- 1993: Rapid City Thrillers
- 1993–1994: Denver Nuggets
- 1994–1995: Rapid City Thrillers
- 1995: Denver Nuggets
- 1996–1997: Fort Wayne Fury
- 1997: La Crosse Bobcats

Career highlights
- Third-team All-American – NABC (1990); First-team All-Big Eight (1991); McDonald's All-American (1986); Third-team Parade All-American (1986)
- Stats at NBA.com
- Stats at Basketball Reference
Medals
Men's basketball
Representing United States
FIBA World Championship
Bronze medal – third place	1990 Argentina	National team
Goodwill Games
Silver medal – second place	1990 Seattle	National team
Summer Universiade
Gold medal – first place	1989 Duisburg	National team

Mark Christopher Randall (born September 30, 1967) is an American former professional basketball player who played in four National Basketball Association (NBA) seasons for the Chicago Bulls, Minnesota Timberwolves, Detroit Pistons, and Denver Nuggets. Randall was selected by the Bulls in the first round (26th pick overall) of the 1991 NBA draft and averaged 2.6 points per game for his career.

Randall attended Cherry Creek High School in Englewood, Colorado where he led the Bruins to the 1986 state title game.

He played collegiately for the University of Kansas. He was a sophomore when the Jayhawks won the 1988 National Championship, but he did not play for the team as a redshirt. He was a senior when the Jayhawks played for the 1991 National Championship where they lost to Duke 72–65. While at Kansas, Randall was an All-American, All-Big Eight pick and a conference All-Academic player. Randall also is the Big Eight all-time leader in field goal percentage, with a .620 career average.

He played for the US national team in the 1990 FIBA World Championship, winning the bronze medal.

== Retirement ==
Following his NBA career, Randall was a college scout for the Denver Nuggets for 3 seasons and also became an Assistant Coach for 1 season. In 2004 he assumed the role as Community Ambassador for the Denver Nuggets. Currently he is a District Athletic Director for Denver Public Schools.

== Career statistics ==
Legend
GP	Games played	GS	Games started	MPG	Minutes per game
FG%	Field goal percentage	3P%	3-point field goal percentage	FT%	Free throw percentage
RPG	Rebounds per game	APG	Assists per game	SPG	Steals per game
BPG	Blocks per game	PPG	Points per game	**Bold**	Career high

=== NBA ===
==== Regular season ====
Year	Team	GP	GS	MPG	FG%	3P%	FT%	RPG	APG	SPG	BPG	PPG
1991–92	Chicago	15	0	4.5	.455	.000	.750	.6	.5	.0	.0	1.7
1991–92	Minnesota	**39**	0	**9.6**	.457	**.214**	.743	**1.6**	**.7**	**.3**	**.1**	**3.7**
1992–93	Minnesota	2	0	4.0	.000	.000	–	.0	.5	.0	.0	.0
1992–93	Detroit	35	0	6.9	**.506**	.143	.615	**1.6**	.3	.1	**.1**	2.8
1993–94	Denver	28	0	5.5	.340	.143	**.786**	.8	.4	**.3**	**.1**	2.1
1994–95	Denver	8	0	4.9	.300	.000	–	1.5	.1	.0	.0	.8
Career		127	0	7.0	.443	.154	.722	1.3	.4	.2	.1	2.6

==== Playoffs ====
Year	Team	GP	GS	MPG	FG%	3P%	FT%	RPG	APG	SPG	BPG	PPG
1994	Denver	2	0	3.0	.000	–	–	2.5	.0	.0	.5	.0
