= George Ackles =

American basketball player (born 1967)

Personal information
- Born: July 4, 1967 (age 59) Pittsburgh, Pennsylvania, U.S.
- Listed height: 6 ft 9 in (2.06 m)
- Listed weight: 216 lb (98 kg)

Career information
- High school: Manteo (Manteo, North Carolina)
- College: Garden City CC (1986–1988); UNLV (1988–1991)
- NBA draft: 1991: 2nd round, 29th overall pick
- Drafted by: Miami Heat
- Playing career: 1991–2002
- Position: Power forward / center

Career history
- 1991–1992: Ourense
- 1992–1993: Rapid City Thrillers
- 1993: Montreal Dragons
- 1993: Peñarol de Mar del Plata
- 1993–1994: Columbus Horizon
- 1993–1994: Rochester Renegade
- 1994: Fargo-Moorhead Fever
- 1994–1995: Pallacanestro Bellinzona
- 1995–1996: Fribourg Olympic
- 1996–1998: Keravnos
- 1999–2000: Las Vegas Silver Bandits
- 2000: Beirut Rosaire Club
- 2000–2001: Shanghai Sharks
- 2001–2002: Las Vegas Rattlers
- 2002: Beijing Ducks
- 2002: Soles de Jalisco

Career highlights
- AP honorable mention All-American (1991); Second-team All-Big West (1991)
- Stats at Basketball Reference

George Edward Ackles (born July 4, 1967) is an American former professional basketball player. He was selected in the 1991 NBA draft as the 29th overall pick after a very successful collegiate career at UNLV. Ackles never played a game in the NBA, however, but still managed to carve out a professional career spanning from 1991 to 2002 with stops in leagues all over the world.
