= Carey Scurry =

American basketball player (1962–2026)

Personal information
- Born: December 4, 1962 Brooklyn, New York, U.S.
- Died: May 18, 2026 (aged 63) Brooklyn, New York, U.S.
- Listed height: 6 ft 7 in (2.01 m)
- Listed weight: 188 lb (85 kg)

Career information
- High school: Alexander Hamilton (Brooklyn, New York)
- College: NE Oklahoma A&M (1981–1982); LIU Brooklyn (1982–1985)
- NBA draft: 1985: 2nd round, 37th overall pick
- Drafted by: Utah Jazz
- Playing career: 1985–1997
- Position: Small forward
- Number: 22, 20

Career history
- 1985–1988: Utah Jazz
- 1988: New York Knicks
- 1988–1989: Olympiacos
- 1989–1990: Rapid City Thrillers
- 1990: Granollers
- 1992: GEPU San Luis
- 1992–1993: ASA Sceaux
- 1993: Damme BAC
- 1995: UDE Temuco
- 1996: Ferro Carril Oeste
- 1996–1997: Colo-Colo

Career highlights
- 2× NEC Player of the Year (1984, 1985)
- Stats at NBA.com
- Stats at Basketball Reference

Carey Scurry (December 4, 1962 – May 18, 2026) was an American professional basketball player. A 6 ft 7 in (2.01 m) small forward from Long Island University. Scurry played three seasons (1985 to 1988) in the National Basketball Association (NBA) as a member of the Utah Jazz and New York Knicks. He averaged 4.7 points and 2.9 rebounds per game over the course of his NBA career. Scurry also played in Greece, Spain, Argentina, Chile and Brazil.

In January 2006, Scurry was named to the Northeast Conference 25th Anniversary Men's Basketball Team.

Carey was the older brother of Moses Scurry, who played on the 1990 UNLV team that won the NCAA championship.

Brazilian coach Helio Rubens Garcia ranked Scurry as the third-most talented player whom he ever coached.

Scurry died on May 18, 2026, at the age of 63.

== Career statistics ==
Legend
GP	Games played	GS	Games started	MPG	Minutes per game
FG%	Field goal percentage	3P%	3-point field goal percentage	FT%	Free throw percentage
RPG	Rebounds per game	APG	Assists per game	SPG	Steals per game
BPG	Blocks per game	PPG	Points per game	**Bold**	Career high

=== NBA ===
==== Regular season ====
Year	Team	GP	GS	MPG	FG%	3P%	FT%	RPG	APG	SPG	BPG	PPG
1985–86	Utah	**78**	0	15.0	.472	.091	.619	**3.1**	1.1	1.0	**.8**	4.7
1986–87	Utah	69	**5**	10.9	.498	.308	**.701**	2.9	.8	.8	**.8**	**5.0**
1987–88	Utah	29	0	**15.4**	.466	**.375**	.692	2.8	**1.7**	**1.6**	**.8**	4.8
1987–88	New York	4	0	2.0	**.500**	–	–	.8	.3	.5	.3	.5
Career		180	5	13.2	.480	.250	.666	2.9	1.1	1.0	.8	4.7

==== Playoffs ====
Year	Team	GP	GS	MPG	FG%	3P%	FT%	RPG	APG	SPG	BPG	PPG
1986	Utah	**4**	0	13.5	.400	.000	**.500**	**4.0**	**.8**	.3	1.0	4.3
1987	Utah	**4**	0	**14.3**	**.455**	**.500**	.429	3.5	.0	**1.0**	**1.3**	**6.0**
Career		8	0	13.9	.429	.250	.444	3.8	.4	.6	1.1	5.1
