= Larry Johnson (basketball, born 1969) =

American basketball player (born 1969)

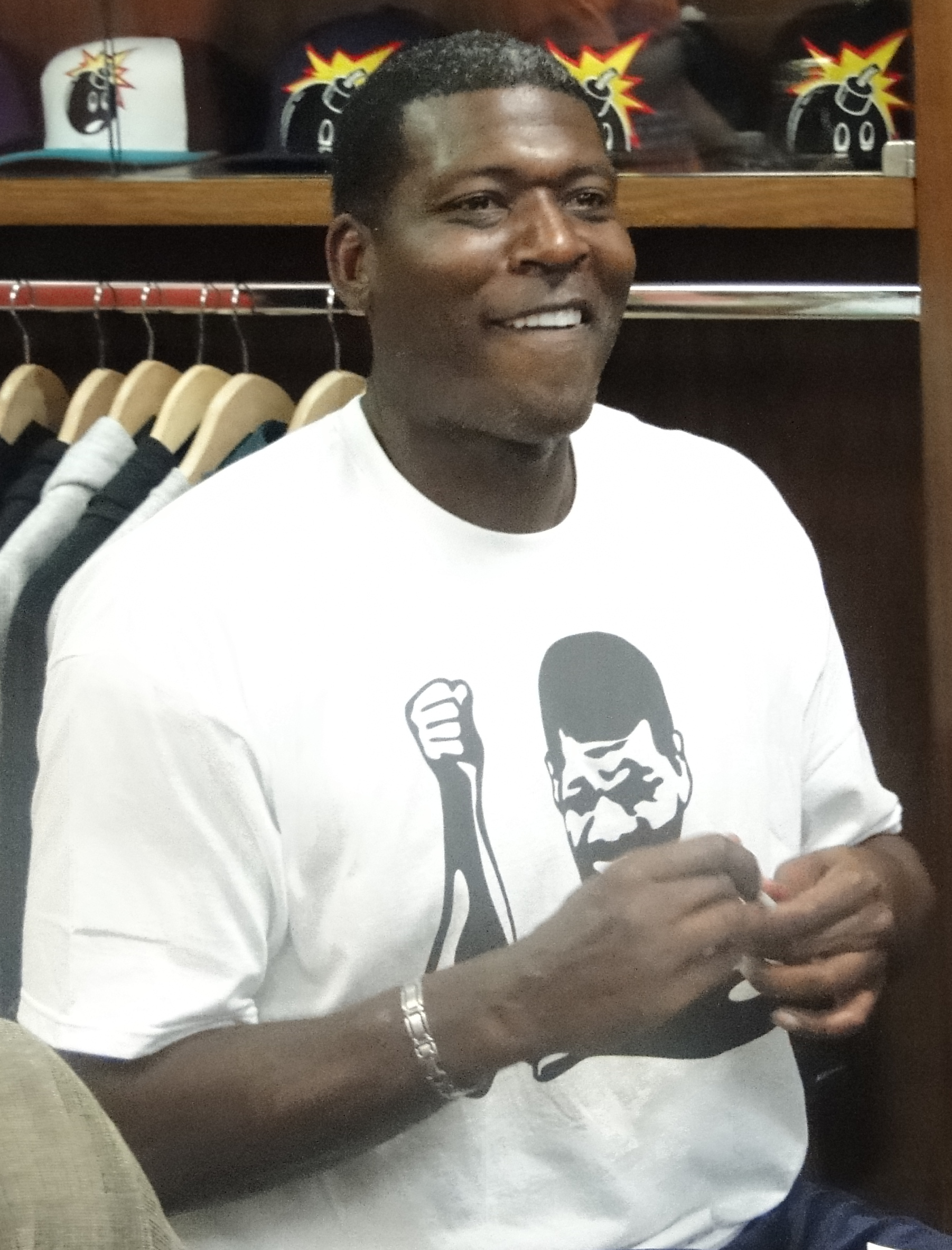
- Johnson in 2008

Personal information
- Born: March 14, 1969 (age 57) Tyler, Texas, U.S.
- Listed height: 6 ft 7 in (2.01 m)
- Listed weight: 235 lb (107 kg)

Career information
- High school: Skyline (Dallas, Texas)
- College: Odessa (1987–1989); UNLV (1989–1991)
- NBA draft: 1991: 1st round, 1st overall pick
- Drafted by: Charlotte Hornets
- Playing career: 1991–2001
- Position: Power forward / small forward
- Number: 2

Career history
- 1991–1996: Charlotte Hornets
- 1996–2001: New York Knicks

Career highlights
- 2× NBA All-Star (1993, 1995); All-NBA Second Team (1993); NBA Rookie of the Year (1992); NBA All-Rookie First Team (1992); NCAA champion (1990); National college player of the year (1991); 2× Consensus first-team All-American (1990, 1991); 2× Big West Player of the Year (1990, 1991); 2x First-team All-Big West (1990, 1991); No. 4 retired by UNLV Runnin' Rebels; 2× NJCAA Division I Player Of The Year (1988, 1989); USA Basketball Male Athlete of the Year (1989); National high school player of the year (1987); First-team Parade All-American (1987); McDonald's All-American (1987); Co-Texas Mr. Basketball (1987)

Career NBA statistics
- Points: 11,450 (16.2 ppg)
- Rebounds: 5,300 (7.5 rpg)
- Assists: 2,298 (3.3 apg)
- Stats at NBA.com
- Stats at Basketball Reference
- Collegiate Basketball Hall of Fame
Medals
Men's basketball
Representing United States
FIBA World Cup
Gold medal – first place	1994 Canada
Summer Universiade
Gold medal – first place	1989 Duisburg
FIBA U19 World Cup
Silver medal – second place	1987 Bormio

Larry Demetric Johnson (born March 14, 1969) is an American former professional basketball player who played in the National Basketball Association (NBA) for ten seasons as a power forward with the Charlotte Hornets and the New York Knicks. An NCAA champion and two-time NBA All-Star, Johnson is a member of the Southern Nevada Sports Hall of Fame and College Basketball Hall of Fame. Johnson won a version of national player of the year at the high school, junior college, and NCAA Division I levels.

== High school career ==
Johnson played at Skyline High School in Dallas, Texas. As a senior, Johnson was named Texas Mr. Basketball, a consensus All-American and was named Mr. Basketball USA. Johnson took part in the 1987 McDonald's All-American Boys Game that included such players as Dennis Scott, Marcus Liberty, Mark Macon, and fellow Texas prep star LaBradford Smith to name a few.

== College career ==
=== Odessa (1987–1989) ===
Johnson originally made a verbal commitment to play for Dave Bliss at Southern Methodist University, but he instead enrolled at Odessa College in Texas following a dispute with the SMU administration about the legitimacy of one of his SAT scores. He played the 1987–88 and 1988–89 seasons at Odessa, averaging 22.3 points per game as a freshman and over 29 points per game his sophomore year, becoming the first and, to date, only player ever to win the National Junior College Athletic Association Division 1 Player of the Year award both years played. There were even some basketball analysts who believed Johnson could have been a first round selection in the 1989 NBA draft (even a possible NBA lottery selection) if he had declared for early entry.

=== UNLV (1989–1991) ===
Johnson eventually transferred to the University of Nevada, Las Vegas (UNLV) to play under head coach Jerry Tarkanian. Alongside future NBA players Stacey Augmon and Greg Anthony, Johnson faced the Duke Blue Devils in the title game of the 1990 NCAA Men's Division I Basketball Tournament. UNLV went on to win the contest by a score of 103–73, with Johnson contributing 22 points and 11 rebounds. The Runnin' Rebels set numerous NCAA records in the tournament, including simultaneous NCAA records for the largest margin of victory and highest score in an NCAA Tournament championship game.

In a post-season mired by charges of recruiting violations and misconduct by UNLV, an agreement was reached between the university and the NCAA to allow for the defense of their title for the 1990–91 season, which would be followed by a suspension from post-season play the following season. Johnson and the Runnin' Rebels responded with a perfect regular season record of 27–0, with an average scoring margin of 26.7 points per game; this total included a 112–105 victory over the Arkansas Razorbacks, ranked second in the country at the time.

In the 1991 NCAA Men's Division I Basketball Tournament, UNLV won the West Regional Tournament only to be upset by eventual champion Duke in the Final Four. Johnson was named a First Team All-American twice, and won the Big West Conference Player of the Year and tournament Most Valuable Player awards in 1990 and 1991. He also won the prestigious John R. Wooden Award and was named Naismith College Player of the Year in 1991. To this day, Johnson is ranked 12th in career scoring and 7th in rebounding at UNLV despite playing only two seasons. He also holds the record for single-season and career field goal percentage. In 2002, Johnson and teammates Augmon and Anthony were inducted into the UNLV Athletic Hall of Fame along with the 1990–91 UNLV men's basketball team. To date they are the only UNLV team to make back-to-back Final Four appearances.

== Professional career ==
=== Charlotte Hornets (1991–1996) ===
Johnson was selected first overall in the 1991 NBA draft by the Charlotte Hornets, and won the NBA Rookie of the Year Award in his first season. He also competed in the 1992 Slam Dunk Contest at the NBA All-Star Weekend in Orlando, finishing second to Cedric Ceballos of the Phoenix Suns.

In 1993, Johnson was voted to start in that year's All-Star Game, making him the first Hornet in franchise history to receive that honor; he enjoyed his best statistical season with averages of 22.1 points per game and 10.5 rebounds per game in 82 games, which earned him All-NBA Second Team honors. Along with Alonzo Mourning, Muggsy Bogues and Dell Curry, Johnson played with the Hornets at the height of their popularity in the early to mid-1990s. During this time, Johnson, who went by his initialism "LJ" and the nickname "Grandmama" (because of a popular series of commercials for Converse, who signed Johnson to an endorsement contract following his entry into the NBA), was featured on the cover of the premiere issue of SLAM.

In October 1993, Johnson signed what was at the time the most lucrative contract in NBA history, a 12-year, $84 million deal with the Hornets. However, he missed 31 games after spraining his back on December 27, 1993, in a game against the Detroit Pistons. During the summer he played for the U.S. national team (nicknamed Dream Team II) in the 1994 FIBA World Championship, winning the gold medal.

Johnson had entered the league as an explosive power forward, averaging over 20 points and 10 rebounds per game. However, after the injury to his back, Johnson was forced to develop an all-around game with an improved outside shot. In the 1994–95 season, he made 81 three-pointers, nearly 60 more than in his first three years combined, and was selected to the 1995 NBA All-Star Game.

Friction between Johnson and Mourning forced the organization to make a change, and the resulting moves made by the Hornets left both players on other teams. Prior to the 1995–96 season, Mourning was traded to the Miami Heat for Glen Rice and Matt Geiger. Following that season, Johnson was dealt to the New York Knicks for Anthony Mason and Brad Lohaus.

=== New York Knicks (1996–2001) ===
Johnson averaged 12.8 points, a career-low, in his first season as a Knick, and although he would never return to his former All-Star form, he was a key member of the Knicks' 1999 Eastern Conference championship team. Johnson took on a lesser role as the Knicks turned to Allan Houston and later Latrell Sprewell as the team's top scorers.

During Game 3 of the Eastern Conference Finals, he was involved in a critical play in which he was fouled by Antonio Davis of the Indiana Pacers. Standing outside the three-point line with 11.9 seconds left, Johnson held the ball, and then began to dribble. He leaned into defender Davis before jumping up. The referee called the foul about a half-second before Johnson released the ball, but it was counted as a continuation shooting foul. Johnson made the shot and converted the free throw following the basket for a four-point play, which turned out to be the winning margin in a 92–91 Knicks victory.

During the 1999 NBA Finals, Johnson characterized the Knicks as a band of "rebellious slaves". Bill Walton later called Johnson and his performance a "disgrace". When Johnson was asked about the play of San Antonio Spurs point guard Avery Johnson in Game 4, Johnson again shifted the topic to slavery: "Ave, man, we're from the same plantation. You tell Bill Walton that. We from Massa Johnson's plantation." He went on to say, "Here's the NBA, full of blacks, great opportunities, they made beautiful strides. But what's the sense of that ... when I go back to my neighborhood and see the same thing? I'm the only one who came out of my neighborhood. Everybody ended up dead, in jail, on drugs, selling drugs. So I'm supposed to be honored and happy or whatever by my success. Yes, I am. But I can't deny the fact of what has happened to us over years and years and years and we're still at the bottom of the totem pole."

Johnson also played a central role in the developing rivalry between the Knicks and the Heat. In Game 5 of the 1997 Eastern Conference Semifinals, Johnson was one of several players who left the Knicks bench during a brawl involving teammate Charlie Ward and Miami's P. J. Brown; he was eventually suspended for Game 7 which the Knicks lost. Then in Game 4 of the 1998 Eastern Conference First Round, Johnson and former Hornets teammate Mourning engaged in a fight which also involved Knicks head coach Jeff Van Gundy holding onto Mourning's leg. Both Johnson and Mourning were suspended for Game 5, in which the seventh-seed Knicks eliminated the second-seed Heat.

On October 10, 2001, Johnson announced his early retirement from basketball due to chronic back problems that had plagued him for several years, after his point production had decreased for three straight years.

== Post-playing career ==
In July 2007, Johnson expressed interest in making a comeback with the Knicks in some type of "leadership role". On December 21, 2007, Johnson received a Bachelor of Arts degree in social science studies from UNLV. In 2008, Johnson was inducted into the Southern Nevada Sports Hall of Fame. He was hired by the Knicks as a basketball and business operations representative on April 8, 2012. In 2014, he was inducted into the Texas Sports Hall of Fame.

== Personal life ==
Johnson converted to Islam. During the NBA season, he observed Ramadan, the holy month of fasting.

Johnson has five children with four women. In 2015, he filed for bankruptcy in a California court, claiming he owed more than $120,000 in unpaid child support.

== Film and television ==
In 1993, Johnson appeared in the episode "Grandmama" of the sitcom Family Matters as his alter ego "Grandmama" (pronounced Grand Ma-Ma), who becomes Steve Urkel's teammate in a basketball tournament. Later that year, he was a guest on the Late Show with David Letterman. Three years later he appeared as himself in the movies Eddie and Space Jam; in the latter he had a supporting role as a fictionalized version of himself. He was one of the NBA stars who had their basketball abilities stolen alongside Muggsy Bogues, Shawn Bradley, Charles Barkley and Patrick Ewing.

== Career statistics ==
Legend
GP	Games played	GS	Games started	MPG	Minutes per game
FG%	Field goal percentage	3P%	3-point field goal percentage	FT%	Free throw percentage
RPG	Rebounds per game	APG	Assists per game	SPG	Steals per game
BPG	Blocks per game	PPG	Points per game	**Bold**	Career high

=== NBA ===
==== Regular season ====
Year	Team	GP	GS	MPG	FG%	3P%	FT%	RPG	APG	SPG	BPG	PPG
1991–92	Charlotte	**82**	77	37.2	.490	.227	**.829**	**11.0**	3.6	**1.0**	**.6**	19.2
1992–93	Charlotte	**82**	**82**	**40.5**	**.526**	.254	.767	10.5	4.3	.6	.3	**22.1**
1993–94	Charlotte	51	51	34.5	.515	.238	.695	8.8	3.6	.6	.3	16.4
1994–95	Charlotte	81	81	39.9	.480	**.386**	.774	7.2	**4.6**	**1.0**	.3	18.8
1995–96	Charlotte	81	81	40.4	.476	.366	.757	8.4	4.4	.7	.5	20.5
1996–97	New York	76	76	34.4	.512	.324	.693	5.2	2.3	.8	.5	12.8
1997–98	New York	70	70	34.5	.485	.238	.756	5.7	2.1	.6	.2	15.5
1998–99	New York	49	48	33.4	.459	.359	.817	5.8	2.4	.7	.2	12.0
1999–00	New York	70	68	32.6	.433	.333	.766	5.4	2.5	.6	.1	10.7
2000–01	New York	65	65	32.4	.411	.313	.797	5.6	2.0	.6	.4	9.9
Career		707	699	36.3	.484	.332	.766	7.5	3.3	.7	.4	16.2
All-Star		2	1	18.0	.444	1.000	1.000	4.0	1.0	.0	.0	5.5

==== Playoffs ====
Year	Team	GP	GS	MPG	FG%	3P%	FT%	RPG	APG	SPG	BPG	PPG
1993	Charlotte	9	9	38.7	.557	.250	.788	**6.9**	**3.3**	.6	.2	19.8
1995	Charlotte	4	4	**43.0**	.477	.111	.800	5.8	2.8	1.0	**.5**	**20.8**
1997	New York	9	9	32.8	**.558**	.353	**.842**	4.0	2.6	.8	.1	13.8
1998	New York	8	8	38.8	.486	.200	.740	6.6	1.6	**1.3**	.4	17.9
1999	New York	**20**	**20**	34.2	.426	.293	.674	4.9	1.6	1.1	.1	11.5
2000	New York	16	16	36.8	.461	**.394**	.794	5.0	1.6	.5	.1	11.3
Career		66	66	36.3	.483	.303	.767	5.3	2.0	.8	.2	14.2

=== College ===
*	Led NCAA Division I

Year	Team	GP	GS	MPG	FG%	3P%	FT%	RPG	APG	SPG	BPG	PPG
1989–90	UNLV	**40***	40	31.5	.624	.342	.767	**11.4**	2.1	1.6	**1.4**	20.6
1990–91	UNLV	35	35	**31.8**	**.662**	**.354**	**.818**	10.9	**3.0**	**2.1**	1.0	**22.7**
Career		75	75	31.6	.643	.349	.789	11.2	2.5	1.9	1.2	21.6

== See also ==
- List of NBA annual minutes leaders
- 1998–99 New York Knicks season
