= Thomas Hill (basketball) =

American basketball player (born 1971)

Personal information
- Born: August 31, 1971 (age 55) Los Angeles, California, U.S.
- Listed height: 6 ft 5 in (1.96 m)
- Listed weight: 200 lb (91 kg)

Career information
- High school: Lancaster (Lancaster, Texas)
- College: Duke (1989–1993)
- NBA draft: 1993: 2nd round, 39th overall pick
- Drafted by: Indiana Pacers
- Playing career: 1993–1998
- Position: Shooting guard

Career history
- 1993: Fargo-Moorhead Fever
- 1993: Fort Wayne Fury
- 1993–1994: La Crosse Catbirds
- 1997: Jacksonville Barracudas
- 1998: Perth Wildcats

Career highlights
- CBA All-Rookie Second Team (1994); 2× NCAA champion (1991, 1992); 3× Third-team All-ACC (1991–1993)
- Stats at Basketball Reference
Medals
Men's basketball
Representing the United States
Pan American Games
Bronze medal – third place	1991 Havana	Team competition

Thomas Lionel Hill Jr. (born August 31, 1971) is an American former professional basketball player.

A 6'5" shooting guard, Hill played at Duke University from 1989 to 1993, winning two NCAA Championships (1991 and 1992). His teammates at Duke included Grant Hill (no relation), Christian Laettner, and Bobby Hurley. Thomas Hill received Third Team All-ACC honors in 1991,1992, 1993 and was a team captain during his senior season.

He played in 141 career games for Duke, 6th on their all-time list as of March 28, 2010; directly behind Jon Scheyer, and tied with Brian Davis.

After graduating, Hill was drafted by the Indiana Pacers in the 2nd round (#39 pick overall) of the 1993 NBA draft. Hill never played an NBA regular season game but he did play in preseason games where he scored a high of 14. Hill played in the Continental Basketball Association (CBA) for the Fargo-Moorhead Fever, Fort Wayne Fury and La Crosse Catbirds during the 1993–94 season. He was selected to the CBA All-Rookie Second Team in 1994. He played in the Australian National Basketball League for one season (appearing in just nine games) for the Perth Wildcats.

Thomas Hill's father, Thomas Sr., won a bronze medal in the 110-meter hurdles at the 1972 Summer Olympics.

Hill is perhaps best remembered for his emotional reaction after his Duke teammate Christian Laettner hit a last-second shot to defeat Kentucky in the elite eight of the 1992 NCAA Tournament. After Laettner hit the shot, a CBS camera panned to Hill who appeared to be crying of joy with his hands on top of his head.

After his basketball career Hill proceeded to coach for Avenues: The World School in New York City and became the head coach of varsity basketball and varsity tennis. He later coached at Howard University.

In 2023, Hill was named the Director of Basketball and Head Coach at the St. Andrews Episcopal School in Austin, Texas. In his first two years as Head Coach, St Andrews won back-to-back Southwest Preparatory Conference titles, in 2024 and in 2025.
