= Greg Koubek =

American basketball player (born 1969)

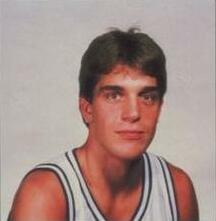
- Koubek with Duke in 1987

Personal information
- Born: March 15, 1969 (age 57) Clifton Park, New York, U.S.
- Listed height: 6 ft 6 in (1.98 m)
- Listed weight: 205 lb (93 kg)

Career information
- High school: Shenendehowa (Clifton Park, New York)
- College: Duke (1987–1991)
- NBA draft: 1991: undrafted
- Position: Forward

Career highlights
- NCAA champion (1991); Second-team Parade All-American (1987); Co-Mr. New York Basketball (1987); McDonald's All-American (1987)

Greg Koubek (born March 15, 1969) is an American former basketball player best known for his collegiate career at Duke University between 1987 and 1991. He also played professionally overseas after college for several years.

== Early life ==
A native of the greater Albany, New York area, Koubek attended Shenendehowa High School from 1985 to 1987 in Clifton Park. He led the basketball team to a state championship as a senior in 1987 and later became the first athlete in school history to have his jersey number retired. Following the 1987 season he was named a McDonald's All-American, and he was the co-honoree of the Mr. New York Basketball award, given to the state's best high school boys' basketball player. Koubek finished his high school career having scored 1,972 points and grabbed 682 rebounds, both being the most in school history.

== College ==
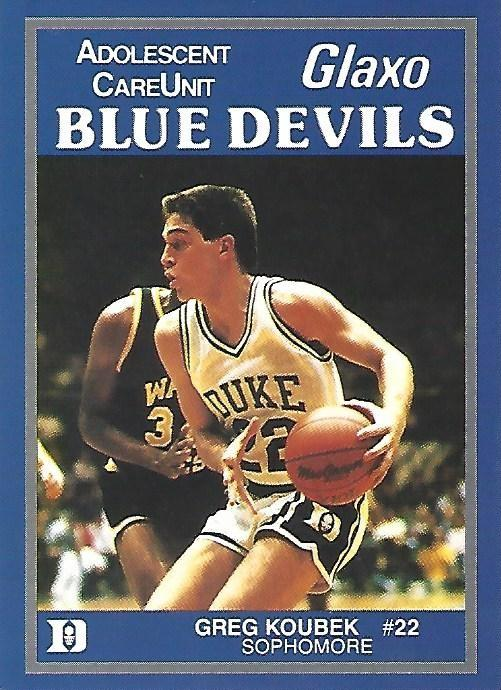
A 1988–89 basketball card of Koubek

Koubek's career playing for the Duke Blue Devils was an overall inauspicious one in terms of personal statistics. Through his first two seasons, he only started in one game, but he did play in all 71 contests. Between his freshman and sophomore seasons he scored 312 points. Duke won the ACC tournament in 1988, his freshman year, and also made it all the way to the NCAA tournament Final Four – the first of five straight Final Four appearances. As a junior in 1990, Duke made it to the 1990 National Championship but Duke's All-American point guard, Bobby Hurley, had an intestinal flu the night of the game, resulting in Duke losing to UNLV, 103–73. That score is still the worst margin of defeat in NCAA Championship Game history. Koubek played in all 38 games and started 12 of them.

As a senior in 1990–91, Koubek made NCAA men's basketball history. He started in 13 games and played in all 38 of them, including Duke's fourth consecutive Final Four where Duke avenged the 1990 Championship game by handing UNLV their first and only loss of the 1990–91 season. Consequently, Koubek became the first player to ever play in four NCAA Final Fours. He also became one of very few players to appear in 145 or more career games (Koubek's 146 career games is second only to Christian Laettner's 147 in Duke history.) That season, Duke won the ACC regular season title and went on to win the first of back-to-back NCAA championships. Koubek was a team captain as a senior as well.

== Professional and later life ==
Koubek spent a short stint playing in the United States Basketball League (USBL) right after college. Afterward, he played professionally for the next six years in South Africa, Turkey, Hungary, and Japan. Koubek retired in 1997 and returned home to the Capital District of New York. Koubek became Executive Director of the Albany YMCA. He moved to California where he served as Executive Director of Gardena-Carson Family YMCA. In addition, he runs an annual basketball camp with his brother, Tim, called the Greg Koubek Basketball Camp. In 2018, Koubek was named Executive Director of the new Triunfo YMCA in Westlake Village, California, opening in 2019.
