= Moses Scurry =

American basketball player

Moses Scurry (born 14 June 1968) is a former college and professional basketball player.

Born in Brooklyn, New York, Scurry played power forward for the UNLV Runnin' Rebels during the 1988–89 and 1989-90 seasons. The Rebels beat Duke University 103-73 to win the title game of the 1990 NCAA Division I men's basketball tournament. Scurry appeared on the cover of Sports Illustrated the following week.

Primarily coming off the bench as the sixth man during UNLV's championship season, Scurry was a favorite among UNLV fans and fellow players because of his animated, shouting style when grabbing rebounds, and was the team's leading rebounder during the 1989 NCAA tournament, pulling down 10.3 per game.

Scurry played in the Japan Basketball League, where he won the MVP award and led Kumagai Gumi Bruins to the league title in 1992.

In 1994-95, Scurry spent six months in jail for his role in a carjacking in which another man was shot. After his release, he returned to Japan to play professional basketball for another season. He later joined the Las Vegas Silver Bandits of the International Basketball League.

Scurry has three daughters, Clarissa, Asia, and Diamond, and a son, Malik. Also, his older brother Carey Scurry played three years in the NBA with the Utah Jazz and New York Knicks.
