= Jerry Tarkanian =

American basketball coach (1930–2015)

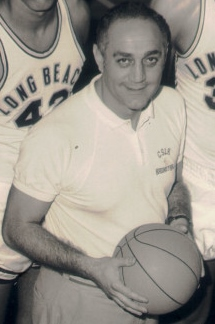
- Tarkanian in the 1970–71 season as Long Beach State head coach

Biographical details
- Born: August 8, 1930; Euclid, Ohio, U.S.
- Died: February 11, 2015 (aged 84); Las Vegas, Nevada, U.S.

Playing career
- 1950–1951: Pasadena CC
- 1954–1955: Fresno State
- Position: Guard

Coaching career (HC unless noted)
- 1955–1957: San Joaquin Memorial HS
- 1957–1958: Antelope Valley HS
- 1958–1960: Redlands HS
- 1961–1966: Riverside CC
- 1966–1968: Pasadena CC
- 1968–1973: Long Beach State
- 1973–1992: UNLV
- 1992: San Antonio Spurs
- 1995–2002: Fresno State

Head coaching record
- Overall: 706–198 (college); 9–11 (NBA)

Accomplishments and honors

Championships
- NCAA Division I tournament (1990); 4 NCAA Division I regional – Final Four (1977, 1987, 1990, 1991); 14 PCAA / Big West regular season (1970–1973, 1983–1992); 9 PCAA / Big West tournament (1972, 1973, 1983, 1985–1987, 1989–1991); WCC regular season (1975); WAC tournament (2000); WAC regular season (2001)

Awards
- UPI Coach of the Year (1983); WAC Coach of the Year (2001); WCAC Coach of the Year (1975); No. 2 retired by Fresno State Bulldogs
- Basketball Hall of Fame; Inducted in 2013

Jerry Tarkanian (August 8, 1930 – February 11, 2015) was an American basketball coach. He coached college basketball for 31 seasons over five decades at three schools. He spent the majority of his career coaching with the UNLV Runnin' Rebels, leading them four times to the Final Four of the NCAA Division I men's basketball tournament, winning the national championship in 1990. Tarkanian revolutionized the college game at UNLV, utilizing a pressing defense to fuel its fast-paced offense. Overall, he won over 700 games in his college coaching career, only twice failing to win 20 games, while never having a losing season. Tarkanian was inducted into the Naismith Memorial Basketball Hall of Fame in 2013.

Tarkanian studied at Pasadena City College and later Fresno State, earning a bachelor's degree while playing basketball. He was a head coach at the high school level before becoming a successful junior college coach at Riverside City College winning three state championships, and returned to Pasadena City College and led them to a state championship. In 1968, he moved to a four-year college at Long Beach State College. Tarkanian established a successful program built on former junior college players, who were typically considered second-rate by other four-year programs. He was also the rare coach who dared to start a predominantly black lineup. He compiled a 122–20 record over five years at Long Beach before moving to the University of Nevada, Las Vegas (UNLV). He transformed the small program into a national powerhouse while granting his players the freedom to express themselves. Known for his colorful behavior and affectionately referred to as "Tark the Shark", Tarkanian became a celebrity in Las Vegas. He left the Runnin' Rebels for a brief stint coaching professionally with the San Antonio Spurs in the National Basketball Association (NBA) before finishing his career at his alma mater, Fresno State.

Throughout his career, he battled accusations of rules violations from the National Collegiate Athletic Association (NCAA), with each of his three universities suffering penalties. Tarkanian responded by challenging the organization to also investigate larger and more powerful universities. The NCAA ordered UNLV to suspend him in 1977, but he sued the NCAA and continued coaching while the case was pending. The Supreme Court ruled against him in 1988, but he remained UNLV's coach after a settlement with the NCAA. Tarkanian sued them again in 1992, and the case was settled when he received $2.5 million in 1998.

== Biography ==
=== Early life ===
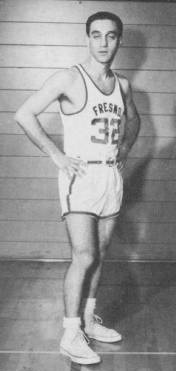
Tarkanian in his senior season (1954–55) playing on the Fresno State men's basketball team

Jerry Esther Tarkanian (Armenian: Ջերի Եսթեր Թարքանյան) was born in 1930 to Armenian immigrants in Euclid, Ohio. His mother, Haigouhie “Rose”, (Armenian: Հայկուհի Թարքանյան) was a survivor of the Armenian genocide. Tarkanian's maternal grandfather, Mickael Effendi Tarkanian (Armenian: Միքայել էֆենդի Թարքանյան), was an Ottoman government official from Malatya who was beheaded by Turkish authorities. Mickael's son was also decapitated by the same authorities. Fearing for their lives, Rose and the rest of her siblings eventually escaped the Ottoman Empire and settled in Lebanon, where Rose met George Tarkanian (Armenian: Ջորջ Թարքանյան). The couple married and moved to the United States. However, Jerry's father died when he was 13. By this time, Jerry showed his interest in sports, but his stepfather disapproved of his involvement with sports, while his mother encouraged him to pursue it. His family later moved to California. A graduate of Pasadena High School, he initially attended Pasadena City College in California and played basketball at the college in the 1950–51 season. Tarkanian then transferred to Fresno State College, where he played basketball for the Bulldogs in the 1954–55 season as a backup guard. After graduating from Fresno State College in 1955, he earned a master's degree in educational management from the University of Redlands.

=== Early coaching career ===
He began his coaching career with five years of California high school basketball, starting with San Joaquin Memorial High School in Fresno. He then moved to Antelope Valley High School in Lancaster (1958) and Redlands High School (1959–1960). He then moved on to the junior college level at Riverside City College from 1961 to 1966 and Pasadena City College from 1966 to 1968. He coached teams to a record four straight California junior college championships — three at Riverside, one at Pasadena.

=== Long Beach State (1968–1973) ===
Tarkanian moved to Division I basketball as coach at Long Beach State from 1968 to 1973. He also pioneered the use of junior college athletes. University of Nevada, Reno history professor Richard O. Davies wrote in his book, The Maverick Spirit, that Tarkanian's recruiting practice drew complaints that he was running a "'renegade' program built upon less than stellar students." When the 49ers made the 1970 NCAA Division I men's basketball tournament led by All-America Ed Ratleff, Tarkanian boasted that his team consisted almost entirely of junior college transfers. Long Beach State reached four straight NCAA tournaments, and established itself as a regional power. Though the schools were separated by just 30 miles (48 km), John Wooden of UCLA refused to schedule a regular season game with them. At the peak of Wooden's dynasty, the schools met in the 1971 West Regional final. Long Beach led at the half by 12, but UCLA prevailed 57–55 en route to their fifth straight national championship. Wary of continuing in UCLA's shadow, Tarkanian accepted an offer to coach at the University of Nevada, Las Vegas in 1973.

=== University of Nevada, Las Vegas (1973–1992) ===
Prior to his arrival, UNLV was dubbed "Tumbleweed Tech" by locals, and their basketball program had no winning track record and minimal fan support. However, he achieved much success there, coaching the Runnin' Rebels from 1973 to 1992. In fact, it was Tarkanian's idea to call the team the "Runnin' Rebels". His teams were known for run-and-gun offense, stifling defense, and going on long runs that turned close games into blowouts. They hit their peak after joining the Pacific Coast Athletic Association (now the Big West Conference) in 1982, winning or sharing 10 straight regular-season titles and winning seven tournament titles.

He took his UNLV teams to four Final Fours. In the first, in 1977 (only seven years after the program joined Division I), the Rebels lost to North Carolina in the semifinals. The Rebels averaged 109 points per game that season in an era before the shot clock or the three-point shot. However, North Carolina controlled the tempo with coach Dean Smith's famous four corners offense, and the Rebels lost 84–83. Ten years later, UNLV was defeated by eventual national champion Indiana. Finally, in the 1990 NCAA Division I men's basketball tournament Tarkanian led UNLV to the championship, prevailing 103–73 against Duke, the largest margin of victory for a championship game in tournament history. That season, the team was heavily monitored by the NCAA, which visited their campus 11 times, and suspended 10 players at various times. The 1990–91 team appeared poised to repeat as champions after running their record to 34–0 while winning by an average margin of 27.3 points. However, a rematch against Duke in the national semifinals saw the Blue Devils prevail 79–77 after the Rebels' Anderson Hunt missed a 22-foot shot at the buzzer.

Tarkanian had been under more or less constant scrutiny from the NCAA for most of his career, but managed to weather the pressure until he signed Lloyd Daniels, a talented, but troubled shooting guard from New York City. In 1987 — just months before he was due to come to campus — Daniels was caught buying crack cocaine from an undercover policeman. While Tarkanian had been known for taking in troubled players, this was too much even for him, and he announced shortly afterward that Daniels would never play for UNLV. Not long after Daniels' arrest, it emerged he'd been led to UNLV by Richard Perry, a prominent gambler who had been convicted twice for sports bribery.

Perry's involvement triggered yet another NCAA investigation, which resulted in the NCAA initially banning the Rebels from the 1991 NCAA Tournament, only months after they won the 1990 title. However, the NCAA later agreed to a compromise which deferred the sanctions until 1992, allowing UNLV to defend its title. Months after UNLV's 1991 semifinal loss to Duke, the Las Vegas Review-Journal published a picture showing three of Tarkanian's players in a hot tub with Perry. The picture had been taken in 1989, only months after Tarkanian claimed that he had warned his players to stay away from Perry. On June 7, 1991, Tarkanian announced he would resign after coaching one more season. Already banned from any postseason play, Tarkanian guided the 1991–92 team to a 26–2 season. He won his final game 65–53 over Utah State.

=== San Antonio Spurs (1992) ===
Tarkanian was offered the Los Angeles Lakers head coaching job in 1979 by new owner Jerry Buss, but declined, continuing to coach college basketball. Tarkanian was hired to coach the San Antonio Spurs in 1992, not long after leaving UNLV. However, he disagreed with Spurs owner Red McCombs over the need for experience at point guard. During the offseason, the Spurs had lost Rod Strickland to free agency, when he signed with Portland, leaving the Spurs without a point guard with significant NBA experience. The Spurs had signed Vinny Del Negro, a combo-guard from the Italian League, to replace Strickland. They also signed NBA journeyman Avery Johnson, formerly of the Houston Rockets, to a one-year contract. Tarkanian felt that the Spurs wouldn't be competitive without an experienced point guard, but McCombs disagreed. As a result, Tarkanian was fired after only 20 games with a 9–11 record. He received a $1.3 million settlement, which he used to fund a lawsuit against the NCAA.

=== Fresno State (1995–2002) ===
He returned to college coaching at his alma mater, California State University, Fresno, from 1995 to 2002 and led them to six consecutive 20-win seasons. Tarkanian led the Bulldogs to five NIT tournaments and two NCAA appearances. He retired from coaching in 2002 with 778 career Division I wins. Following his retirement, Fresno State was placed on probation by the NCAA for violations committed by its men's basketball team under Tarkanian's watch. The Fresno Bee reported in 2003 that some Fresno State basketball players had coursework completed for them from 1999 to 2001.

== Tarkanian and the NCAA ==
Tarkanian spent most of his career as a Division I coach in a battle with the NCAA. While at Long Beach, he wrote a newspaper column charging that the NCAA ignored improprieties at powerful schools while it pursued smaller, more defenseless institutions. After he left Long Beach State, its basketball program was slapped with probation for recruiting violations which occurred under his watch.

Just months before the 1976–1977 season, the NCAA placed UNLV on two years' probation for "questionable practices". Although the alleged violations dated back to 1971—before Tarkanian became coach—the NCAA pressured UNLV into suspending Tarkanian as coach for two years. Tarkanian sued, claiming the suspension violated his right to due process. In October 1977, a Nevada judge issued an injunction that reinstated Tarkanian as coach. The case eventually made it all the way to the Supreme Court of the United States, which ruled in 1988 that the NCAA had the right to discipline its member schools, reversing the 1977 injunction.

In the decade between the original suspension and the Supreme Court ruling, it was revealed that the NCAA's enforcement process was stacked heavily in the NCAA's favor—so heavily, in fact, that it created a perception that there was no due process. The enforcement staff was allowed to build cases on hearsay, and shared few of their findings with the targeted school. The resulting negative publicity led the NCAA to institute a clearer separation between the enforcement staff and the infractions committee, as well as a system for appeals. Also, hearsay evidence was no longer admissible in infractions cases.

NCAA executive director Walter Byers famously disliked Tarkanian, and said "Tark's black players play a fast city-lot basketball without much style. Grab ball and run like hell, not lots of passing to set up the shots." Byers described UNLV's style as "ghetto run-and-shoot basketball" with little concern for defense.

After being fired from the Spurs, Tarkanian sued the NCAA, claiming it had harassed him for over two decades. The harassment, Tarkanian claimed, started when he wrote a newspaper column alleging that the NCAA was more willing to punish less-prominent schools than big-name schools. Although the NCAA did not admit harassing Tarkanian, it settled out of court in 1998, paying him $2.5 million.

== Legacy ==
Tarkanian was inducted into the Naismith Memorial Basketball Hall of Fame in 2013, an honor that fellow coaches had been saying was overdue. "Time has a way of healing things. And in this case, time worked in his favor," said Hall of Fame chairman Jerry Colangelo. The controversy from his NCAA dealings was widely believed to have contributed to the delay. ESPN wrote that Tarkanian "helped revolutionize the way the college game was played". Hall of Fame coach Larry Brown said he "influenced a lot of coaches", and coach Mike Krzyzewski added that he "taught pressure man-to-man defense as well as anyone has ever done." Upon Tarkanian's retirement, future Hall of Fame coach Jim Calhoun proclaimed him "one of the best teachers of defense in the last 25 to 30 years of basketball." In 31 years of coaching over five decades at three Division I schools, he compiled a career record of 729–201. At UNLV, 39 of his players were selected in the NBA draft; Larry Johnson was the first overall pick in 1991, and Armen Gilliam was No. 2 overall in 1987.

Tarkanian was an innovator who had his teams play a pressing defense that forced turnovers to trigger its run-and-gun offense. He was one of the few early coaches to effectively use the three-point shot, which was added by the NCAA in 1986. Tarkanian recruited players that his peers often passed over, taking chances on junior college students or those with a troubled past. His players hailed predominately from urban areas, and he allowed his team the freedom to express themselves. While some of those players were high-maintenance, he was the rare coach who was able to blend multiple personalities together into a team, and they played with a unique swagger. Tarkanian's teams changed the style and image of college basketball in a way that predated the impact the Fab Five of Michigan had in the 1990s. "He made the players more important than him. He made the players the show. It was about the players first," said former UNLV assistant Mark Warkentien. According to Fab Five member Jalen Rose, "We were considered rough-and-tumble at Michigan, but it started with UNLV."

UNLV was transformed by Tarkanian from a small commuter college into a national powerhouse. Demand for UNLV sweatshirts grew across the nation. He became a celebrity, and tickets to UNLV games became hot items with regulars, including Vegas headliners Frank Sinatra, Bill Cosby and Don Rickles. With no professional teams then playing in the city, the Rebels became the town's center of attention, and their pregame ceremonies included light shows and fireworks during player introductions. His success at UNLV paved the way for other successful mid-majors.

The floor of UNLV's home arena at the Thomas & Mack Center was named "Jerry Tarkanian Court" in 2005. A bronze life-size statue of Tarkanian was added outside the arena in 2013. Since 2012, Bishop Gorman High School in Las Vegas has held the Tarkanian Classic, a high school tournament featuring some of the top teams in the country. In 2014, Fresno State retired Tarkanian's No. 2 jersey from his college playing days.

Tarkanian also has a middle school located in Southern Highlands, NV named after him and his wife Lois.

== Personal life ==
He had small roles in the 1979 film, The Fish That Saved Pittsburgh as the LA Team Coach, in the 1992 film, Honeymoon in Vegas as a poker player, and in the 1994 film, Blue Chips as a basketball coach.

Jerry Tarkanian was married to Las Vegas city councilwoman Lois Tarkanian. They had four children and ten grandchildren. One of their sons, Danny Tarkanian, was an All-American Honorable Mention college basketball player while playing for Jerry Tarkanian at UNLV and has since run several political campaigns in Nevada.

Tarkanian was a good friend of college basketball coach Bob Knight. Tarkanian and Knight matched wits in the national semifinals of the 1987 NCAA Division I men's basketball tournament in New Orleans, with Knight's Indiana Hoosiers defeating UNLV, 97–93.

He also started a basketball school in Las Vegas, named The Tarkanian Basketball Academy.

His granddaughter Dannielle Diamant played for Northwestern University women's basketball team for three years (2009–2012).

On February 11, 2015, Tarkanian died at the age of 84 at Valley Hospital Medical Center in Las Vegas, where he had been hospitalized days earlier after having difficulty breathing. In a tribute to him, the city of Las Vegas lowered its flags at City Hall to half-staff on that day. On February 18, the casinos along the Las Vegas Strip dimmed their lights for roughly three minutes in Tarkanian's honor.

Tarkanian was portrayed by Rory Cochrane in the HBO series Winning Time: The Rise of the Lakers Dynasty.

== Head coaching record ==
=== College ===
Record table
Season	Team	Overall	Conference	Standing	Postseason
Long Beach State 49ers (NCAA University Division independent) (1968–1969)
1968–69	Long Beach State	23–3			
Long Beach State 49ers (Pacific Coast Athletic Association) (1969–1973)
1969–70	Long Beach State	23–5	10–0	1st	NCAA University Division Regional Fourth Place
1970–71	Long Beach State	24–5	10–0	1st	NCAA University Division Elite Eight
1971–72	Long Beach State	25–4	10–2	1st	NCAA University Division Elite Eight
1972–73	Long Beach State	26–3	10–2	1st	NCAA University Division Regional Third Place
Long Beach State:		122–20 (.859)	40–4 (.909)		
UNLV Runnin' Rebels (West Coast Athletic Conference) (1973–1975)
1973–74	UNLV	20–6	10–4	3rd	
1974–75	UNLV	24–5	13–1	1st	NCAA Division I Second Round
UNLV Runnin' Rebels (NCAA Division I independent) (1975–1982)
1975–76	UNLV	29–2			NCAA Division I Second Round
1976–77	UNLV	29–3			NCAA Division I Final Four
1977–78	UNLV	20–8			
1978–79	UNLV	21–8			
1979–80	UNLV	23–9			NIT Fourth Place
1980–81	UNLV	16–12			
1981–82	UNLV	20–10			NIT Second Round
UNLV Runnin' Rebels (Pacific Coast Athletic Association / Big West Conference) (1982–1992)
1982–83	UNLV	28–3	15–1	1st	NCAA Division I Second Round
1983–84	UNLV	29–6	16–2	1st	NCAA Division I Sweet 16
1984–85	UNLV	28–4	17–1	1st	NCAA Division I Second Round
1985–86	UNLV	33–5	16–2	1st	NCAA Division I Sweet 16
1986–87	UNLV	37–2	18–0	1st	NCAA Division I Final Four
1987–88	UNLV	28–6	15–3	1st	NCAA Division I Second Round
1988–89	UNLV	29–8	16–2	1st	NCAA Division I Elite Eight
1989–90	UNLV	35–5	16–2	T–1st	NCAA Division I Champion
1990–91	UNLV	34–1	18–0	1st	NCAA Division I Final Four
1991–92	UNLV	26–2	18–0	1st	
UNLV:		509–105 (.829)	188–18 (.913)		
Fresno State Bulldogs (Western Athletic Conference) (1995–2002)
1995–96	Fresno State	22–11	13–5	3rd	NIT Quarterfinal
1996–97	Fresno State	20–12	12–4	T–1st (Pacific)	NIT First Round
1997–98	Fresno State	21–13	10–4	2nd (Pacific)	NIT Semifinal
1998–99	Fresno State	21–12	9–5	T–2nd (Pacific)	NIT First Round
1999–00	Fresno State	24–10	11–3	2nd	NCAA Division I First Round
2000–01	Fresno State	26–7	13–3	1st	NCAA Division I Second Round
2001–02	Fresno State	19–15	9–9	T–5th	NIT First Round
Fresno State:		153–80 (.657)	77–33 (.700)		
Total:		784–202 (.795)			
National champion Postseason invitational champion Conference regular season champion Conference regular season and conference tournament champion Division regular season champion Division regular season and conference tournament champion Conference tournament champion

Note: The record of 784–202 includes six NCAA tournament games vacated by the NCAA while at Long Beach State and 49 games vacated while at Fresno State. Excluding these games, the record would be 729–201 (.784).

=== NBA ===
Legend
Regular season	G	Games coached	W	Games won	L	Games lost	W–L %	Win–loss %
Playoffs	PG	Playoff games	PW	Playoff wins	PL	Playoff losses	PW–L %	Playoff win–loss %

Team	Year	G	W	L	W–L%	Finish	PG	PW	PL	PW–L%	Result
San Antonio	1992–93	20	9	11	.450	(fired)	—	—	—	—	—

== Publications ==
- Tarkanian, Jerry; Warren, William E. (1980). Winning Basketball Systems. Allyn & Bacon. ISBN 978-0205070992.
- Tarkanian, Jerry (1983). Winning Basketball: Drills and Fundamentals. William C Brown Pub. ISBN 978-0697068316.
- Tarkanian, Jerry; Pluto, Terry (1988). Tark: College Basketball's Winningest Coach. Mcgraw-Hill. ISBN 978-0070628021.
- Tarkanian, Jerry; Wetzel, Dan (2005). Shark Tales of "Extra Benefits," Frank Sinatra, and Winning It All. Sports Publishing. ISBN 1596700181.

== See also ==
- List of college men's basketball coaches with 600 wins
- List of NCAA Division I Men's Final Four appearances by coach
