= Bobby Hurley =

American basketball player and coach (born 1971)

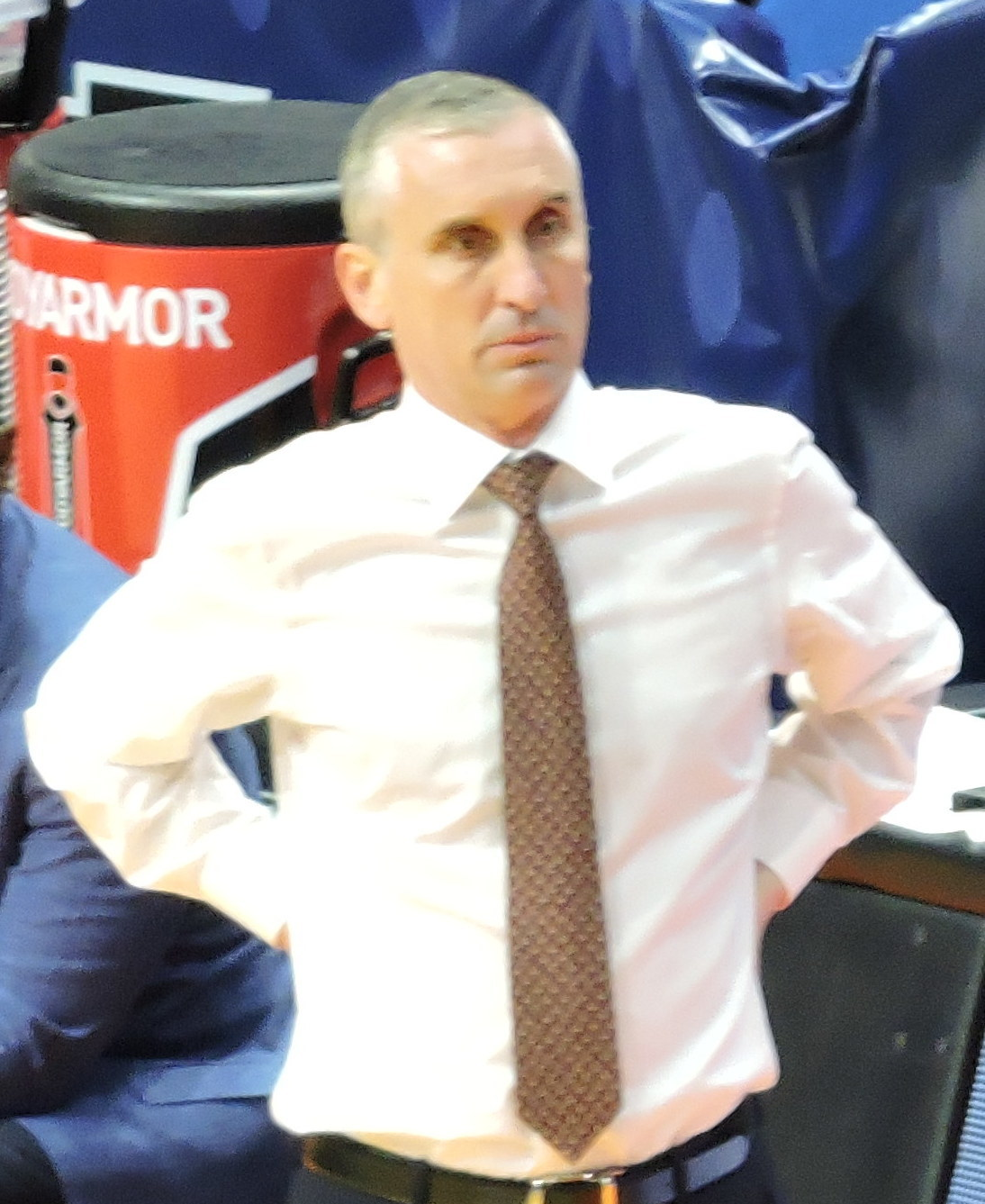
- Hurley coaching in 2019

Personal information
- Born: June 28, 1971 (age 55) Jersey City, New Jersey, U.S.
- Listed height: 6 ft 0 in (1.83 m)
- Listed weight: 165 lb (75 kg)

Career information
- High school: St. Anthony (Jersey City, New Jersey)
- College: Duke (1989–1993)
- NBA draft: 1993: 1st round, 7th overall pick
- Drafted by: Sacramento Kings
- Playing career: 1993–1998
- Position: Point guard
- Number: 7, 11
- Coaching career: 2010–present

Career history

Playing
- 1993–1998: Sacramento Kings
- 1998: Vancouver Grizzlies

Career highlights
- As player: 2× NCAA champion (1991, 1992); NCAA Final Four Most Outstanding Player (1992); Consensus first-team All-American (1993); Third-team All-American – AP, UPI (1992); First-team All-ACC (1993); Second-team All-ACC (1992); Third-team All-ACC (1991); No. 11 retired by Duke Blue Devils; McDonald's All-American Co-MVP (1989); First-team Parade All-American (1989); Fourth-team Parade All-American (1988); As head coach: MAC tournament champion (2015); MAC regular season champion (2015); 2× MAC East Division champion (2014, 2015)

Career statistics
- Points: 1,032 (3.8 ppg)
- Rebounds: 283 (1.1 rpg)
- Assists: 880 (3.3 apg)
- Stats at NBA.com
- Stats at Basketball Reference
Medals
Men's basketball
Representing United States
Goodwill Games
| Silver medal – second place | 1990 Seattle | National team |
Summer Universiade
| Gold medal – first place | 1991 Sheffield | National team |

Robert Matthew Hurley (born June 28, 1971) is an American college basketball coach and former professional player. He was previously the head coach at the University at Buffalo and Arizona State University.

As a college senior, he was a unanimous first-team All-American for the Duke Blue Devils, with whom he won consecutive national championships. He is 2nd in all time assists in men’s college basketball, with 1,076, holding the record for 33 years before it was broken by Braden Smith of Purdue in 2026. He played in the National Basketball Association (NBA) for the Sacramento Kings and Vancouver Grizzlies from 1993 to 1999.

== Early life ==
Hurley was born to Bob Hurley Sr. and Christine Hurley on June 28, 1971, in Jersey City, New Jersey, where he was raised with his siblings Dan and Melissa. Hurley attended Our Lady of Mercy grammar school in Jersey City.

== Playing career ==
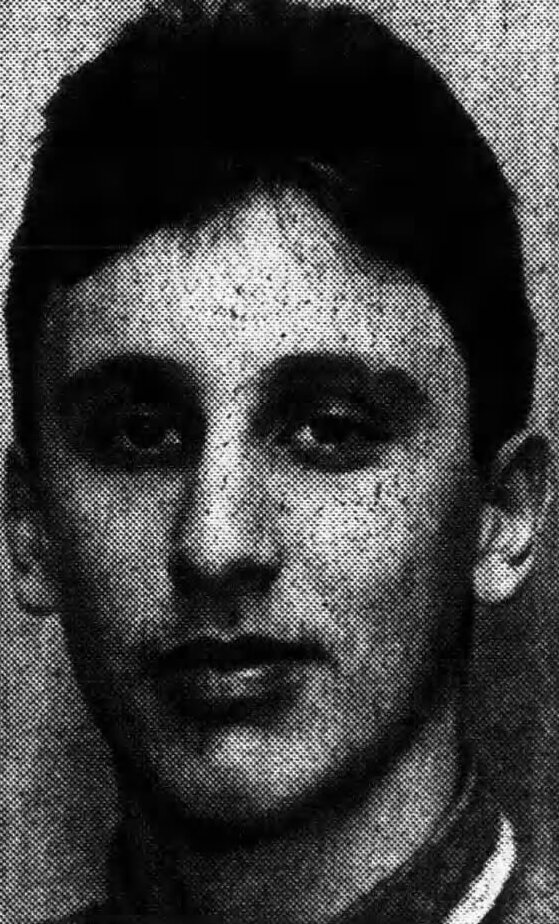
Hurley in high school, circa 1988

Hurley was a basketball star at St. Anthony High School in Jersey City, where his father was the longtime coach. While at St. Anthony from 1985 to 1989, Hurley led the team to four consecutive Parochial B state titles. In his senior year he averaged 20 points, 8 assists and 3 steals, as St. Anthony racked up a 32–0 record, the school's first Tournament of Champions crown, and the No. 1 ranking in the US. His high school team's overall record with Hurley as point guard was 115–5.

=== Duke ===
Hurley was a point guard for coach Mike Krzyzewski's Duke University team from 1989 to 1993. He was a first-team All-America in 1993, went to the Final Four three times, and helped lead the Blue Devils to back-to-back national championships in 1991 and 1992 with All American teammates Christian Laettner and Grant Hill, earning Final Four Most Outstanding Player honors in 1992. Hurley is second on the list of NCAA all-time assists leaders with 1076 assists, and is Duke's single game assist leader with 16 (against Florida State on February 24, 1993). His Duke jersey number 11 was retired in 1993. In 2002, Hurley was named to the ACC 50th Anniversary men's basketball team as one of the fifty greatest players in Atlantic Coast Conference history.

In 2006, Hurley, who is of Polish descent through his mother, was inducted into the National Polish American Sports Hall of Fame. At Duke, Hurley was a member of the Sigma Phi Epsilon fraternity. Bobby Hurley played against his younger brother Dan in an NCAA Tournament game, when Duke squared off against Seton Hall.

Bobby Hurley appeared in the 1994 college basketball feature film Blue Chips, playing on the Indiana team under coach Bobby Knight.

=== NBA ===
Hurley was selected by the Sacramento Kings as the seventh pick in the 1993 NBA draft. He signed a shoe contract with a new shoe company ITZ (In The Zone), which was sold at Foot Locker exclusively.

On December 12, 1993, while Hurley was returning home following a game in his rookie season, he was involved in a car accident. His SUV was broadsided by a station wagon. Hurley was not wearing a seat belt, was thrown from his vehicle, and suffered life-threatening injuries. Kings teammate Mike Peplowski was driving five minutes behind Hurley and was among the first on the scene to render immediate aid.

Hurley returned to the NBA for the 1994–95 season and played four more years beyond that. He was traded to the Vancouver Grizzlies on February 18, 1998, and played in 27 games for the Grizzlies. Hurley was waived by the Grizzlies on January 25, 1999.

== Coaching ==
Hurley was hired as a scout by the Philadelphia 76ers in 2003.

On April 13, 2010, Wagner College announced that Hurley was hired as an assistant coach for the men's basketball team. Hurley joined his younger brother Dan Hurley's coaching staff. Dan Hurley had been hired as Wagner's head coach on April 6, 2010. In 2012, the Hurleys took coaching positions at Rhode Island.

On March 26, 2013, Hurley was named the head coach of the University at Buffalo (Buffalo Bulls), replacing Reggie Witherspoon. Hurley coached the 2014–15 Bulls team to their first NCAA tournament appearance.

=== Arizona State University ===
On April 9, 2015, Hurley was hired as head coach at Arizona State. In his first conference game, he was ejected for two technical fouls in 15 seconds for arguing with the officials against rival Arizona. After he was ejected, he encouraged the crowd to continue to taunt the officials. Following a 15–17 first season at Arizona State, Hurley's contract was extended through 2021.

The 2016–2017 season showed improvements and ASU improved its roster with transfers and a few recruits.

In the 2017–2018 season, Hurley led Arizona State to its first 12–0 start and they swept their non-conference schedule. Despite their early success, the Sun Devils struggled mightily in Pac-12 conference play, going 8–10 and earning the ninth seed in the Pac-12 tournament, where they were defeated in the first round by the Colorado Buffaloes. Nevertheless, ASU earned a bid to the NCAA tournament and faced Syracuse in a First Four matchup in Dayton. The Orange beat the Sun Devils 60–56, ending their season. Hurley's squad finished 20–12.

On December 22, 2018, Hurley led the Sun Devils to their first home win (and second ever) against a #1-ranked team when they defeated the Kansas Jayhawks.

In his final two seasons at Arizona State, Hurley oversaw the Sun Devils' transition to the Big 12 from the Pac-12, winning a combined 11 conference games while losing 27. ASU finished 15th of 16 teams in their first season as Big 12 members despite having one of the best recruiting classes in school history, led by consensus 5-star prospect Jayden Quaintance and two other 4-star recruits.

Consistent with the rollercoaster nature of his tenure, during Hurley's final season in 2025-26, the Sun Devils had court-storming home wins against #13 Texas Tech and #14 Kansas in the final month of the regular season and a first-round win in the Big 12 Tournament. But in the second round, they suffered a 91-42 loss versus Iowa State, the worst loss in history of the Big 12 tournament. It was announced on March 11, 2026, that Hurley's contract would not be renewed in June. He finished his 11-year coaching tenure at Arizona State with an 185−167 record, three NCAA tournament appearances, as well as a 4−19 record against in-state rival Arizona

== Horse racing ==
A fan of thoroughbred horse racing, Hurley owned Songandaprayer who won the 2001 Fountain of Youth Stakes. He was also co-owner with breeder with Nik Visger. In December 2009 he was sued by PNC Bank for defaulting on a $1 million loan that was used to purchase Songandaprayer, who was trained by Eddie Plesa Jr. He owns Devil Eleven Stables, which went into foreclosure in 2010, and was sold in 2011.

== Personal life ==
Hurley married Leslie Palceski on November 2, 1995. They have two daughters and a son: Cameron, Sydney, and Bobby.

== Head coaching record ==
Record table
| Season | Team | Overall | Conference | Standing | Postseason |
|---|---|---|---|---|---|
Buffalo Bulls (Mid-American Conference) (2013–2015)
| 2013–14 | Buffalo | 19–10 | 13–5 | 1st (East) | |
| 2014–15 | Buffalo | 23–10 | 12–6 | T–1st (East) | NCAA Division I Round of 64 |
| Buffalo: | | 42–20 (.677) | 25–11 (.694) | | |
Arizona State Sun Devils (Pac-12 Conference) (2015–2024)
| 2015–16 | Arizona State | 15–17 | 5–13 | 11th | |
| 2016–17 | Arizona State | 15–18 | 7–11 | 8th | |
| 2017–18 | Arizona State | 20–12 | 8–10 | T–8th | NCAA Division I First Four |
| 2018–19 | Arizona State | 23–11 | 12–6 | 2nd | NCAA Division I Round of 64 |
| 2019–20 | Arizona State | 20–11 | 11–7 | T–3rd | |
| 2020–21 | Arizona State | 11–14 | 7–10 | 9th | |
| 2021–22 | Arizona State | 14–17 | 10–10 | 8th | |
| 2022–23 | Arizona State | 23–13 | 11–9 | T–5th | NCAA Division I Round of 64 |
| 2023–24 | Arizona State | 14–18 | 8–12 | T–9th | |
Arizona State Sun Devils (Big 12 Conference) (2024–2026)
| 2024–25 | Arizona State | 13–20 | 4–16 | 15th | CBC First round |
| 2025–26 | Arizona State | 17–16 | 7–11 | T–11th | |
| Arizona State: | | 185–167 (.526) | 90–115 (.439) | | |
| Total: | | 227–187 (.548) | | | |
National champion Postseason invitational champion Conference regular season champion Conference regular season and conference tournament champion Division regular season champion Division regular season and conference tournament champion Conference tournament champion

== See also ==
- List of NCAA Division I men's basketball career assists leaders
