= National Association of Amateur Athletes of America =

19th century athletic organization

- Sport: Track and Field
- Founded: 1879; 147 years ago
- Folded: 1888
- Country: United States

National Association of Amateur Athletes of America (NAAA) was formed in 1879. This was the organized body for the Amateur Athletes before the Amateur Athletic Union (AAU) took over in 1888.

== NAAA History ==
=== NAAA formation ===
After the Amateur National Championships (1876 to 1879) were held for several years, several meetings took place in the New York area to create an Association of Amateur Athletes. The Association was mostly formed by Athletic Clubs (from USA and Canada) for uniformity and setting of rules and guidance of the various sports. Track and Field (Athletics) was one of the sports included in the formation of this Association. Starting in 1888, the Amateur Athletic Union (AAU) took over the USA Outdoor Track and Field Championships Athletes.

=== NAAA National Championships (prior to AAU) 1879 to 1888 ===
In 1888 there was both a NAAA and AAU Championships. NAAA competitions were held at various athletic clubs grounds.

1888 Manhattan AC grounds, New York, New York on Oct. 13, 1888.

1887 Manhattan AC grounds, New York, New York on Sept 17, 1887.

1886-2 NYAC grounds, Mott Haven, NY on Sept 18, 1886.

1886-1 Staten Island AC grounds, West Brighton, Staten Island on June 26, 1886.

1885 Manhattan AC grounds, New York, New York on June 13, 1885.

1884 Williamsburg AC grounds, Brooklyn, NY on Sept 28, 1884.

1883 NYAC grounds, Mott Haven, NY on June 2, 1883.

1882 Polo grounds, New York, New York on June 10, 1882. Note: June 11, 1882 Boston Globe included meet results.

1881 NYAC grounds, Mott Haven, NY on Sept 24, 1881. Note: Sept 25, 1881 Boston Globe had full meet results.

1880 NYAC grounds, Mott Haven, NY on Sept 25, 1880. Note: Sept 26, 1880 The Sun, New York, New York included meet results.

1879 NYAC grounds, Mott Haven, NY on Sept 27, 1879.

=== Past NAAA presidents ===
1879 George W Carr was elected president, 1880 & 1881 & 1882 A. H. Curtis was elected president, 1883 & 1884 & 1885 Gilbert H Badeu elected president, and 1887 Walter Storm was elected. George W Carr and Walter Storm were from the Manhattan Athletic Club. A. H. Curtis was from the New York Athletic Club (NYAC). Gilbert H Badeu was from the Williamsburg Athletic Club.

=== Constitution and bylaws ===
April 22, 1879: The Crimson (Cambridge) (reported on Nov 4, 1882), "In April, 1879 the N.A.A.A. was formed ...". A constitution was in the process of adoption.

Jan 1880 the NAAA released the definition of what an "amateur" was.

The 1880 and 1886 National Association of Amateur Athletes of America's Constitution and Bylaws are both available on-line. List of Associated Clubs and Rules are includes in both.

In 1883 a twelve-page document, published in New York, was released under the name "Amateur Athlete." The document includes records of events.

=== NAAA National Convention, Definition, and Resolution (prior to AAU) 1879 to 1888 ===
1890: Jan 1, 1890: NAAA to be “merged” into the AAU.

1889: July 1889 & Dec 1889: Board of Manager Meetings in New York between AAU and NAAA took place to resolve a “merger”.

1888: Two separate organizations and two separate national championships existed: AAU and NAAA (National Association of Amateur Athletics).

1888: Sept 15, 1888 and Oct 7 at Manhattan Athletic Club, New York. Track & Field competition was originally scheduled on Sept 15, and was moved to Oct. 13, 1888 at Manhattan Athletic Club's grounds, New York. President of NCAAA and MAAAA was Walter Storm.

1885: March 1885: A sub-committee created (and adopted) a definition for "amateur athlete".

1882: June 12, 1882. Meeting in New York. A. H. Curtis was elected president.

1881: By 1881 twenty-one clubs were part of the NAAA.

1881: Sept 24, 1881. General Meeting in New York.

1881: Jan 12, 1881. As resolution was adopted for whom may compete in NAAA competitions.

1880: Nov 17, 1880: Executive Committee meeting was held to discuss if several athletes should be reinstated.

1880: By 1880 twelve clubs were part of the NAAA. In 1880 a set of amateur rules and amateur records were published by the National Association of Amateur Athletics at their 183 Broadway “headquarters”. The executive committee included George W. Carr.

1879: Evening of Sept 27, 1879 in New York. George Carr was elected president (Convention held after the competition).

1879: April 22, 1879 (in New York) Formation of the NAAA (National Association of Amateur Athletics). Seven clubs became charter members.

Note: March 25, 1878 a meeting of the American Association of Amateur Athletics was held at the Sturtevant House. This was fourth meeting held to define constitution and bylaws of the association.

== AAU: Post-1887 ==
There were several athletes and several clubs requesting the Association's definition of "Amateur" and "professional" be redefined. Later these disagreements assisted in the takeover by the Amateur Athletic Union (AAU).

Post 1887 the Competition information can be found on the USA Outdoor Track and Field Championships web page.

== Amateur National Championships ==
=== Amateur National Championships (prior to NAAA) 1876 to 1879 ===
In 1879 the meet doubled as the first NAAA Championship

1878 Mott Haven, NY on Oct 12, 1878.

1877 Mott Haven, NY on Sept 8, 1877.

1876 Mott Haven, NY on Sept 30, 1876.

One of the original clubs for Amateur Athletics was the New York Athletic Club which was founded in 1868. The Mott Haven grounds with cinder track were obtained by the club in 1875.

=== 1876 Amateur National Champions ===
The 1876 Amateur Championship included the following winners: Frederick C. Saportas (100), Edward Merritt (440), Harold Lambe (Canadian) (880 and mile), George Hitchcock (120 hurdles), H. Edwards Fickens (HJ), Isaiah Frazier (LJ), H. E. Buermeyer (SP), William B. Curtis (HT), and D. M. Stern & Charles Connor (Walks).
