= 2018 USA Team Handball Nationals – men's open division =

2018 USA Team Handball Nationals – Men's Open Division
- Season: 2017–18
- Dates: 17 – 20. Mai 2018
- Champion: Los Angeles THC
- Matches played: 36
- Goals scored: 1,577 (43.81 per match)
- All statistics correct as of 2018-05-09.

The 2018 Nationals was the 48th Men's Nationals. The Nationals was a team handball tournament to determine the National Champion from 2018 from the US.

== Venues ==
The championship was played at four courts at the Myrtle Beach Sports Center in Myrtle Beach, South Carolina.

Location of the Myrtle Beach Sports Center

== Modus ==
Location of 2018 USA Team Handball Nationals Men's Open Division Teams
The two green dots teams have two play a Playoff for the Elite Division first

First there is a playoff game between Houston Firehawks and Los Angeles THC for the last wildcard. The winner play in the Elite Division

After that the eleven teams are split in two pools A and B and they play a round roubin.

The last teams per group played a 9-11th place semifinal.

The last third and fourth teams per group were qualified for the 5-8th place semifinals.

The losers from the 5-8th place semis played a 7th place game and the winners the 5th place game.

The best two teams per group were qualified for the semifinals.

The losers from the semis played a small final and the winners the final.

== Results ==
=== 4th Wildcard Playoff ===
17 Mai 2018; 17:00 (UTC-4)	Houston Firehawks	10-0	Los Angeles	Court 2, Myrtle Beach Sports Center
17 Mai 2018; 17:00 (UTC-4)		Report		Court 2, Myrtle Beach Sports Center

=== Group stage ===
==== Group A ====
Team	Pld	W	D	L	GF	GA	GD	Pts
Los Angeles THC (19)	5	4	0	1	116	86	+30	8
Carolina Blue (12)	5	3	0	2	119	102	+17	6
Long Island Tigers (NV)	5	3	0	2	108	121	−13	6
West Point Gold (24)	5	2	0	3	118	128	−10	4
San Francisco CalHeat 2 (NV)	5	2	0	3	82	89	−7	4
Minnesota (NR)	5	1	0	4	93	110	−17	2

17 Mai 2018; 19:45 (UTC-4)	Los Angeles	0-10 (Forfeit)	San Francisco CalHeat 2	Court 1, Myrtle Beach Sports Center
17 Mai 2018; 19:45 (UTC-4)		Report		Court 1, Myrtle Beach Sports Center

17 Mai 2018; 19:45 (UTC-4)	Minnesota	19-23	Long Island Tigers	Court 4, Myrtle Beach Sports Center
17 Mai 2018; 19:45 (UTC-4)		Report		Court 4, Myrtle Beach Sports Center

18 Mai 2018; 8:00 (UTC-4)	Minnesota	19-23	San Francisco CalHeat 2	Court 4, Myrtle Beach Sports Center
18 Mai 2018; 8:00 (UTC-4)		Report		Court 4, Myrtle Beach Sports Center

18 Mai 2018; 10:45 (UTC-4)	West Point Gold	19-31	Los Angeles	Court 1, Myrtle Beach Sports Center
18 Mai 2018; 10:45 (UTC-4)		Report		Court 1, Myrtle Beach Sports Center

18 Mai 2018; 12:00 (UTC-4)	Carolina Blue	28-13	Long Island Tigers	Court 3, Myrtle Beach Sports Center
18 Mai 2018; 12:00 (UTC-4)		Report		Court 3, Myrtle Beach Sports Center

18 Mai 2018; 13:15 (UTC-4)	Minnesota	20-18	West Point Gold	Court 2, Myrtle Beach Sports Center
18 Mai 2018; 13:15 (UTC-4)		Report		Court 2, Myrtle Beach Sports Center

18 Mai 2018; 15:45 (UTC-4)	Carolina Blue	22-26	Los Angeles	Court 1, Myrtle Beach Sports Center
18 Mai 2018; 15:45 (UTC-4)		Report		Court 1, Myrtle Beach Sports Center

18 Mai 2018; 17:15 (UTC-4)	West Point Gold	27-21	San Francisco CalHeat 2	Court 4, Myrtle Beach Sports Center
18 Mai 2018; 17:15 (UTC-4)		Report		Court 4, Myrtle Beach Sports Center

18 Mai 2018; 19:45 (UTC-4)	Carolina Blue	23-19	Minnesota	Court 3, Myrtle Beach Sports Center
18 Mai 2018; 19:45 (UTC-4)		Report		Court 3, Myrtle Beach Sports Center

18 Mai 2018; 20:00 (UTC-4)	Los Angeles	30-16	Long Island Tigers	Court 2, Myrtle Beach Sports Center
18 Mai 2018; 20:00 (UTC-4)		Report		Court 2, Myrtle Beach Sports Center

19 Mai 2018; 8:00 (UTC-4)	Carolina Blue	26-29	West Point Gold	Court 2, Myrtle Beach Sports Center
19 Mai 2018; 8:00 (UTC-4)		Report		Court 2, Myrtle Beach Sports Center

19 Mai 2018; 9:15 (UTC-4)	San Francisco CalHeat 2	19-26	Long Island Tigers	Court 4, Myrtle Beach Sports Center
19 Mai 2018; 9:15 (UTC-4)		Report		Court 4, Myrtle Beach Sports Center

19 Mai 2018; 9:15 (UTC-4)	Minnesota	19-29	Los Angeles	Court 4, Myrtle Beach Sports Center
19 Mai 2018; 9:15 (UTC-4)		Report		Court 4, Myrtle Beach Sports Center

19 Mai 2018; 11:45 (UTC-4)	San Francisco CalHeat 2	15-20	Carolina Blue	Court 3, Myrtle Beach Sports Center
19 Mai 2018; 11:45 (UTC-4)		Report		Court 3, Myrtle Beach Sports Center

19 Mai 2018; 12:00 (UTC-4)	Long Island Tigers	30-25	West Point Gold	Court 4, Myrtle Beach Sports Center
19 Mai 2018; 12:00 (UTC-4)		Report		Court 4, Myrtle Beach Sports Center

==== Group B ====
Team	Pld	W	D	L	GF	GA	GD	Pts
Dallas (NV)	4	3	1	0	88	79	+9	7
New York City 2 (NR)	4	3	0	1	109	77	+32	6
Georgia (8)	4	2	0	2	97	85	+12	4
New York City 3 (25)	4	1	0	3	71	100	−29	2
Carolina (NV)	4	0	1	3	76	100	−24	1

17 Mai 2018; 19:45 (UTC-4)	Dallas	26-25	New York City 2	Court 2, Myrtle Beach Sports Center
17 Mai 2018; 19:45 (UTC-4)		Report		Court 2, Myrtle Beach Sports Center

17 Mai 2018; 21:00 (UTC-4)	Carolina	19-25	New York City 3	Court 3, Myrtle Beach Sports Center
17 Mai 2018; 21:00 (UTC-4)		Report		Court 3, Myrtle Beach Sports Center

18 Mai 2018; 8:00 (UTC-4)	Georgia	18-21	Dallas	Court 1, Myrtle Beach Sports Center
18 Mai 2018; 8:00 (UTC-4)		Report		Court 1, Myrtle Beach Sports Center

18 Mai 2018; 10:45 (UTC-4)	Carolina	14-23	New York City 2	Court 2, Myrtle Beach Sports Center
18 Mai 2018; 10:45 (UTC-4)		Report		Court 2, Myrtle Beach Sports Center

18 Mai 2018; 14:30 (UTC-4)	Carolina	19-28	Georgia	Court 1, Myrtle Beach Sports Center
18 Mai 2018; 14:30 (UTC-4)		Report		Court 1, Myrtle Beach Sports Center

18 Mai 2018; 14:30 (UTC-4)	New York City 3	14-36	New York City 2	Court 3, Myrtle Beach Sports Center
18 Mai 2018; 14:30 (UTC-4)		Report		Court 3, Myrtle Beach Sports Center

18 Mai 2018; 18:30 (UTC-4)	New York City 2	25-23	Georgia	Court 3, Myrtle Beach Sports Center
18 Mai 2018; 18:30 (UTC-4)		Report		Court 3, Myrtle Beach Sports Center

18 Mai 2018; 18:30 (UTC-4)	Dallas	17-12	New York City 3	Court 4, Myrtle Beach Sports Center
18 Mai 2018; 18:30 (UTC-4)		Report		Court 4, Myrtle Beach Sports Center

19 Mai 2018; 8:00 (UTC-4)	Georgia	28-20	New York City 3	Court 1, Myrtle Beach Sports Center
19 Mai 2018; 8:00 (UTC-4)		Report		Court 1, Myrtle Beach Sports Center

19 Mai 2018; 11:45 (UTC-4)	Carolina	24-24	Dallas	Court 3, Myrtle Beach Sports Center
19 Mai 2018; 11:45 (UTC-4)		Report		Court 3, Myrtle Beach Sports Center

=== Championship ===
Semifinals
A1	Los Angeles	26
B2	New York City 2	25
B1	Dallas	25
A2	Carolina Blue	26

Final
A1	Los Angeles	34
A2	Carolina Blue	31
Small Final
B2	New York City 2	31
B1	Dallas	28

==== Semifinals ====
19 Mai 2018; 17:15 (UTC-4)	Los Angeles	26-25	New York City 2	Court 4, Myrtle Beach Sports Center
19 Mai 2018; 17:15 (UTC-4)		Report		Court 4, Myrtle Beach Sports Center

19 Mai 2018; 18:15 (UTC-4)	Dallas	25-26	Carolina Blue	Court 1, Myrtle Beach Sports Center
19 Mai 2018; 18:15 (UTC-4)		Report		Court 1, Myrtle Beach Sports Center

==== Small Final ====
20 Mai 2018; 9:15 (UTC-4)	New York City 2	31-28	Dallas	Court 3, Myrtle Beach Sports Center
20 Mai 2018; 9:15 (UTC-4)		Report		Court 3, Myrtle Beach Sports Center

==== Final ====
20 Mai 2018; 10:30 (UTC-4)	Los Angeles	34-31	Carolina Blue	Court 2, Myrtle Beach Sports Center
20 Mai 2018; 10:30 (UTC-4)		Report		Court 2, Myrtle Beach Sports Center

=== Consolation 5-8th Place ===
5-8th Place Semifinals
A3	Long Island Tigers	28
B4	New York City 3	25
B3	Georgia	34
A4	West Point Gold	24

5th Place
A3	Long Island Tigers	15
B3	Georgia	21
7th Place
B4	New York City 3	21
A4	West Point Gold	29

==== 5-8th Place Semifinals ====
19 Mai 2018; 17:00 (UTC-4)	Long Island Tigers	28-25	New York City 3	Court 1, Myrtle Beach Sports Center
19 Mai 2018; 17:00 (UTC-4)		Report		Court 1, Myrtle Beach Sports Center

19 Mai 2018; 15:45 (UTC-4)	Georgia	34-24	West Point Gold	Court 1, Myrtle Beach Sports Center
19 Mai 2018; 15:45 (UTC-4)		Report		Court 1, Myrtle Beach Sports Center

==== 7th Place ====
20 Mai 2018; 8:00 (UTC-4)	New York City 3	21-29	West Point Gold	Court 3, Myrtle Beach Sports Center
20 Mai 2018; 8:00 (UTC-4)		Report		Court 3, Myrtle Beach Sports Center

==== 5th Place ====
20 Mai 2018; 9:15 (UTC-4)	Long Island Tigers	15-21	Georgia	Court 2, Myrtle Beach Sports Center
20 Mai 2018; 9:15 (UTC-4)		Report		Court 2, Myrtle Beach Sports Center

=== Consolation 9-11th Place ===
9-11th Place Semifinals			9th Place
			A5	San Francisco CalHeat 2	14
B5	Carolina	21	A6	Minnesota	17
A6	Minnesota	25

==== 9-11th Place Semifinal ====
19 Mai 2018; 14:30 (UTC-4)	Carolina	21-25	Minnesota	Court 1, Myrtle Beach Sports Center
19 Mai 2018; 14:30 (UTC-4)		Report		Court 1, Myrtle Beach Sports Center

==== 9th Place ====
20 Mai 2018; 8:00 (UTC-4)	San Francisco CalHeat 2	14-17	Minnesota	Court 2, Myrtle Beach Sports Center
20 Mai 2018; 8:00 (UTC-4)		Report		Court 2, Myrtle Beach Sports Center

== Final ranking ==
Rank	Team
1st place, gold medalist(s)	Los Angeles THC
2nd place, silver medalist(s)	Carolina Blue
3rd place, bronze medalist(s)	New York City THC 2
4	Dallas THC
5	Georgia HC
6	Long Island Tigers
7	West Point Gold
8	New York City THC 3
9	Minnesota TH
10	San Francisco CalHeat 2
11	Carolina

== Statistics ==
=== Awards ===
Most Valuable Player:	Roger Silva	Dallas Team Handball Club
Most Valuable Goalkeeper:	Michael Gordon	Long Island Tigers
Top Scorer:	Roger Silva	Dallas Team Handball Club

=== Top scorers ===
Rank	Name	Goals	Games	Average	Team
1st place, gold medalist(s)	Roger Silva	66	6	11	Dallas THC
2nd place, silver medalist(s)	Alriel Briggs	45	7	6.43	Long Island Tigers
3rd place, bronze medalist(s)	Julian Schinzel	42	7	6	Carolina Blue
4	Sebastian Wheeler	42	7	6	Long Island Tigers
5	Eugene Thagard	35	7	5	West Point Gold

=== All-Tournament Team ===
Pivot

Andrew Donlin

Los Angeles THC

Center Back

Left Back
Ahmed ElHady ElSayed
Right Back

Roger Silva
Los Angeles THC
Alriel Briggs

Dallas THC

Long Island Tigers

Left Wing

Goalkeeper

Right Wing
Pierre-Yves Coudrette

Michael Gordon

player
New York City THC II

Long Island Tigers

team

Most Valuable Goalkeeper
