= Raymond McGuire =

American businessman (born 1957)

Ray McGuire
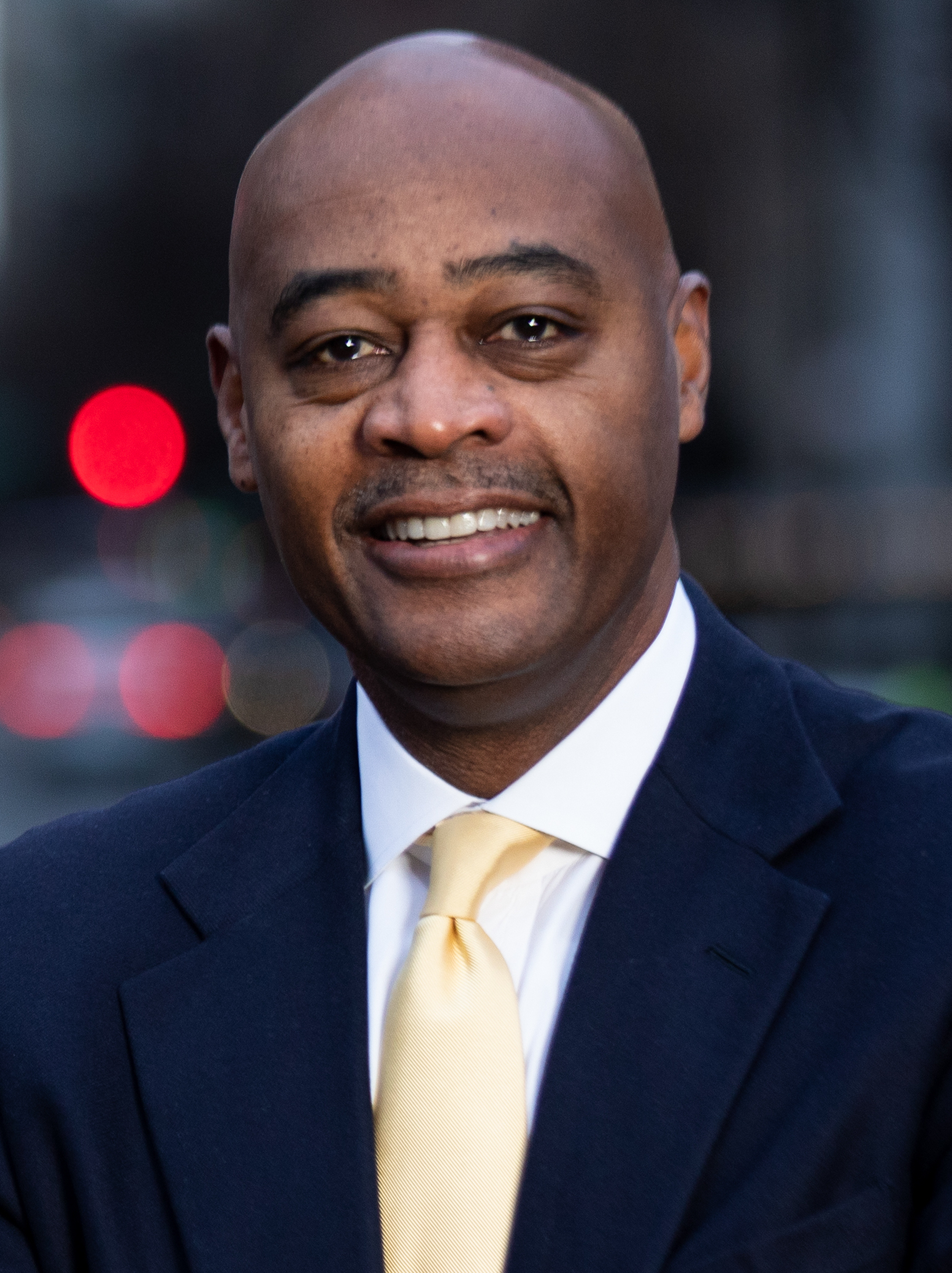
- Born: January 23, 1957 (age 69); Dayton, Ohio, U.S.
- Education: Harvard University (AB, JD, MBA)
- Spouse: Crystal McCrary
- Children: 3, including Cole Anthony (step-son)

Raymond J. McGuire (born January 23, 1957) is an American investment banking executive. As of 2023 he is the president of the international financial services and investment banking firm Lazard, and is based in its New York headquarters. Previously, he worked for 15 years as a senior executive at Citigroup, following executive positions at Merrill Lynch and Morgan Stanley.

In 2021 he was a candidate in the New York City Democratic mayoral primary.

== Early life and education ==
McGuire was born in Dayton, Ohio, and raised there by his mother and grandparents. Through scholarships, he attended the Hotchkiss School in Lakeville, Connecticut.

He graduated with a B.A. from Harvard College in 1979. McGuire attended the University of Nice in France on a Rotary Fellowship in 1980. In 1984, he received an M.B.A. from Harvard Business School and a Juris Doctor from Harvard Law School.

== Career ==
=== Early Wall Street career ===
McGuire began working in finance in 1984 at First Boston. He was next one of the original members of the investment bank Wasserstein Perella & Co., and then was managing director in the mergers and acquisitions group at Merrill Lynch. He subsequently spent several years as global co-head of mergers and acquisitions at Morgan Stanley.

=== Citigroup ===
McGuire moved to Citigroup in 2005, where he initially worked as the global co-head of investment banking. In 2009, he became sole head of global banking; by 2012, this title had changed to global head of corporate and investment banking. In all, McGuire spent 13 years as global head of Citigroup's corporate and investment banking.

In 2018 he became vice chairman of Citigroup, and chairman of Citigroup's banking, capital markets and advisory business. During his tenure at Citigroup, McGuire served as business advisor for a number of major deals, including AT&T's acquisition of Time Warner, the Time Warner Cable split, Wyeth's sale to Pfizer, ConocoPhillips' acquisition of Burlington Resources, Koch Industries' acquisition of Georgia-Pacific, the sale of Electronic Data Systems to Hewlett-Packard, and UST Inc.'s sale to Altria.

Prior to announcing his candidacy for mayor in late 2020, McGuire was one of the highest-ranking and longest-serving African American business executives on Wall Street. He was a bundler to Barack Obama's 2008 presidential campaign, and was mentioned as a possible candidate for a position in the U.S. Department of the Treasury in 2013. In 2018 he was named as a candidate to serve as the president of the Federal Reserve Bank of New York, but the job went to John C. Williams.

=== Lazard ===
In 2023 McGuire was appointed president of the financial services and investment banking firm Lazard, with responsibility for strengthening relationships with banking clients and institutional investors, attracting new talent, and assisting the firm's global expansion. He is based in Lazard's New York offices.

== Board memberships ==
McGuire is on the board of directors of Hess Corporation, and on the board of trustees of Vornado Realty Trust. He was formerly a member of the boards of KKR & Co. and Wyeth.

He is chairman of the board of trustees of the Studio Museum in Harlem, vice chairman of the board of trustees of the New York Public Library, treasurer of the board of trustees of the American Museum of Natural History, and a vice president of the board of trustees of Hotchkiss School. He is a member of the boards of trustees of the Whitney Museum, The WNET Group, and the New York City Police Foundation.

He is chairman of the board of directors of the Regional Plan Association, and a member of the boards of directors of the French-American Foundation and the Terra Foundation for American Art.

== 2021 mayoral campaign ==
In October 2020, McGuire announced he would run for Mayor of New York City in 2021. Valerie Jarrett was co-chair of his campaign. McGuire pledged to focus his campaign on racial unrest amid the George Floyd protests and economic recovery from the COVID-19 pandemic.

Three months after beginning his campaign, McGuire had raised $5 million with notable contributions from the business community.

In May 2021, when The New York Times editorial board asked eight mayoral candidates the median sales price for a home in Brooklyn, McGuire ("somewhere in the $80,000 to $90,000 range, if not higher") and fellow candidate Shaun Donovan ("I would guess it is around $100,000") greatly underestimated the amount, which was $900,000. Nicole Gelinas, a senior fellow at the Manhattan Institute, characterized their estimates as being "out of touch with what’s going on in the city".

McGuire ultimately finished in seventh place, with 2.3% of the vote.

== Personal life ==
McGuire is married to Crystal McCrary McGuire, a television producer and novelist. He has one child with his wife, plus two step-children from her previous marriage to Greg Anthony, including Cole Anthony, a National Basketball Association (NBA) player for the Orlando Magic.

== Awards ==
McGuire was a 2022 recipient of the W. E. B. Du Bois Medal, "Harvard's highest honor in the field of African and African American studies. It is awarded to individuals in the United States and across the globe in recognition of their contributions to African and African American culture and the life of the mind".
