= Cole Anthony =

American basketball player (born 2000)

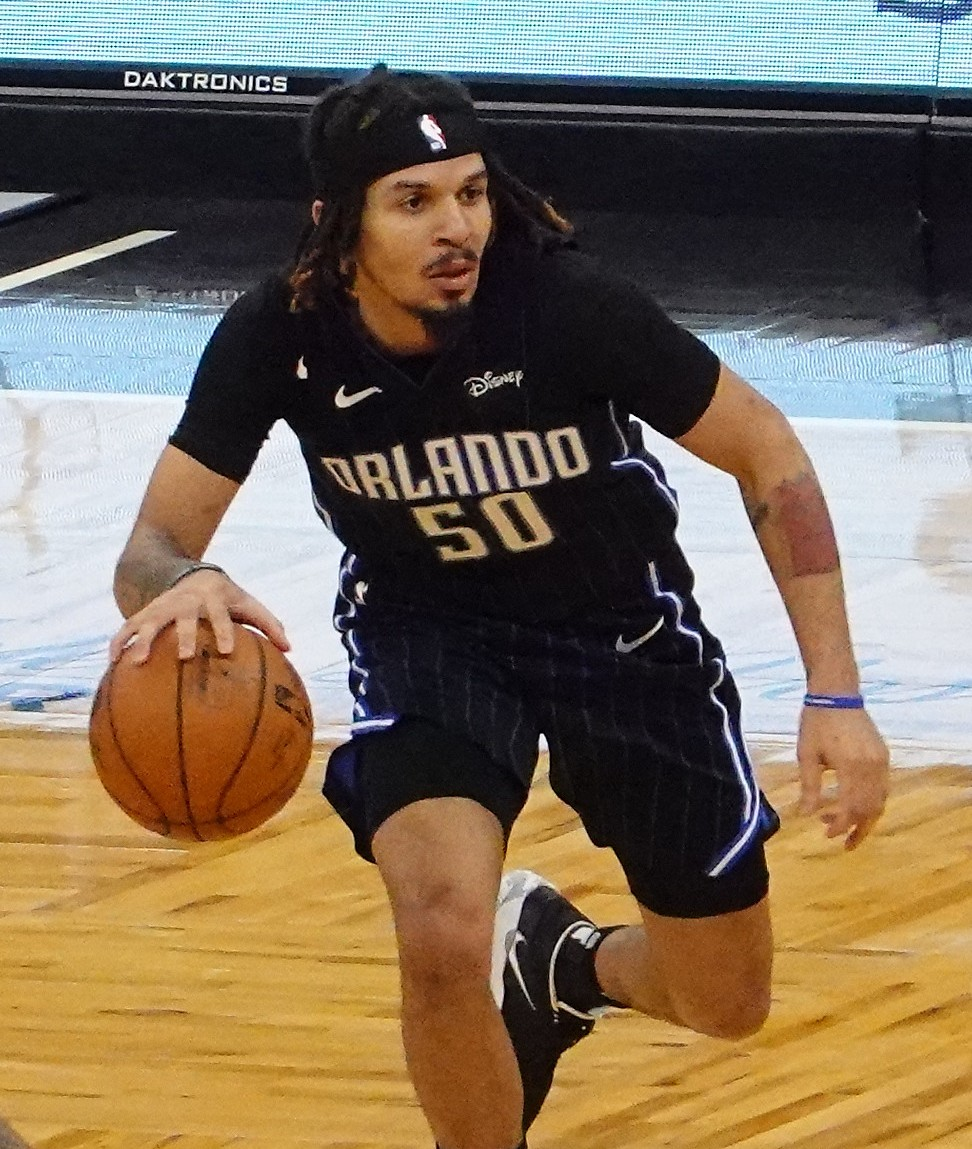
- Anthony with the Orlando Magic in 2021

No. 3 – Melbourne United
- Position: Point guard
- League: NBL

Personal information
- Born: May 15, 2000 (age 26) Portland, Oregon, U.S.
- Listed height: 6 ft 2 in (1.88 m)
- Listed weight: 185 lb (84 kg)

Career information
- High school: Archbishop Molloy (Briarwood, New York); Oak Hill Academy (Mouth of Wilson, Virginia)
- College: North Carolina (2019–2020)
- NBA draft: 2020: 1st round, 15th overall pick
- Drafted by: Orlando Magic
- Playing career: 2020–present

Career history
- 2020–2025: Orlando Magic
- 2025–2026: Milwaukee Bucks
- 2026–present: Melbourne United

Career highlights
- Third-team All-ACC (2020); ACC All-Freshman Team (2020); Nike Hoop Summit MVP (2019); McDonald's All-American Game MVP (2019)
- Stats at NBA.com
- Stats at Basketball Reference
Medals
Men's basketball
Representing the United States
FIBA Americas U18 Championship
Gold medal – first place	2018 Canada	National team

Cole Hinton Anthony (born May 15, 2000) is an American professional basketball player for Melbourne United of the Australian National Basketball League (NBL). He played college basketball for the North Carolina Tar Heels. Listed at 6 feet 2 inches (1.88 meters) and 185 pounds (84 kilograms), he plays the point guard position.

The son of Greg Anthony, who played 6 seasons in the National Basketball Association (NBA), he grew up in Manhattan, New York and attended Archbishop Molloy High School before transferring to Oak Hill Academy for his final year. He was rated a consensus five-star recruit and the best point guard in the 2019 class. As a senior, he earned USA Today All-USA first team honors and was named most valuable player (MVP) of the McDonald's All-American Game, Jordan Brand Classic, and Nike Hoop Summit. In his freshman season at North Carolina, Anthony earned third-team All-ACC accolades despite missing six weeks due to injury.

In 2018, Anthony led the United States to a gold medal and was named to the all-tournament team at the FIBA Under-18 Americas Championship in St. Catharines, Ontario.

== Early life ==
Anthony was born in Portland, Oregon, where his father, Greg Anthony, was playing for the Portland Trail Blazers. His umbilical cord was wrapped around his neck at birth, affecting his heart rate at the time but not leading to further complications. As a toddler, Anthony's family moved to Manhattan, where he grew up in a penthouse. Even though he came from a wealthy family, Anthony's parents insisted on raising him with hard-working values. He later commented, "They don't hand anything to me in life. What they do hand to me is knowledge."

Anthony first played baseball, a sport his father initially thought he would pursue, but decided to focus on basketball in fifth grade. In his childhood, he worked with private basketball trainers and played pick-up games at local parks, seeking out older opponents. From a young age, Anthony was coached by Steve Harris, who mentored NBA player Kemba Walker and was a prominent Amateur Athletic Union (AAU) figure in New York. When he was 11 years old, he appeared in Little Ballers, a 2013 Nickelodeon documentary film directed by his mother, Crystal McCrary. The film featured Anthony's New York-based AAU team, New Heights.

== High school career ==
In his first three years of high school, Anthony played basketball for Archbishop Molloy High School in Briarwood, New York. He was the first freshman to immediately start at point guard for Molloy. Christ the King Regional High School head coach Joe Arbitello called Anthony "the best point guard I've seen since Stephon Marbury at that age." Anthony averaged 16.9 points and 6.7 rebounds per game and garnered All-Catholic High School Athletic Association (CHSAA) Class AA second team recognition.

As a sophomore, Anthony led Molloy to the CHSAA Class AA city championship finals, where his team was upset by Cardinal Hayes High School. He recorded a season-high 31 points in a win over Iona Prep in December 2016. Anthony averaged 20.7 points, 7.8 rebounds, and 5.8 assists per game and was named to the All-CHSAA Class AA first team with teammate, junior Moses Brown. In June 2017, he played for the PSA Cardinals at the Nike Elite Youth Basketball League (EYBL), a noted amateur circuit, and was named Defensive Player of the Year after leading all players in steals.

In his junior season, Anthony and Brown formed one of the top duos in high school basketball and Molloy's history. As team co-captain, Anthony averaged a league-high 23.4 points, 7.8 rebounds, and 4.1 assists per game. He was named All-CHSAA Class AA first team, USA Today All-USA third team, and MaxPreps Junior All-American third team. He scored a season-best 37 points against John Marshall High School at the City of Palms Classic in December 2017. In July 2018, Anthony won the most valuable player (MVP) award with the PSA Cardinals in the Nike EYBL after averaging 26.9 points, 7.6 rebounds, and 3.5 assists over 16 games.

On July 28, 2018, Anthony announced that he would transfer to Oak Hill Academy for his senior year. He joined the team with Kofi Cockburn, another highly regarded prospect in the 2019 class. Entering the season, Oak Hill was widely considered one of the best high school teams in the country. Anthony missed a few games of his senior season with an ankle injury. He led his team to the semifinals of the GEICO High School Nationals. Anthony averaged 18.5 points, 10.2 rebounds, and 10.2 assists per game, leading Oak Hill to a 31–5 record, and became the first player in school history to average a triple-double. He earned spots on the USA Today All-USA first team and MaxPreps All-American third team. Anthony was recognized as Virginia Gatorade Player of the Year for his success in both basketball and academics. He was named MVP of three prestigious high school all-star games: the McDonald's All-American Game, where he had 14 points, five rebounds, and seven assists, and the Nike Hoop Summit and Jordan Brand Classic.

=== Recruiting ===
Anthony was considered one of the top recruits in the 2019 class since his sophomore season in high school. On April 23, 2019, Anthony committed to play college basketball for North Carolina. His other top choices were Georgetown, Notre Dame, and Oregon. By the end of his high school career, he was by consensus a five-star recruit, top-five player, and the number one point guard in his class. ESPN ranked him as the second-best player in the class.

College recruiting
Name	Hometown	School	Height	Weight	Commit date
Cole Anthony; PG	New York City, NY	Oak Hill Academy (VA)	6 ft 3 in (1.91 m)	185 lb (84 kg)	Apr 23, 2019
Cole Anthony; PG	Recruit ratings: Rivals: 247Sports: ESPN: (96)				
Overall recruit ranking: Rivals: 4 247Sports: 3 ESPN: 2
Note: In many cases, Scout, Rivals, 247Sports, On3, and ESPN may conflict in their listings of height and weight.; In these cases, the average was taken. ESPN grades are on a 100-point scale.; Sources: "North Carolina 2019 Basketball Commitments". Rivals.; "2019 North Carolina Tar Heels Recruiting Class". ESPN.; "2019 Team Ranking". Rivals.

== College career ==
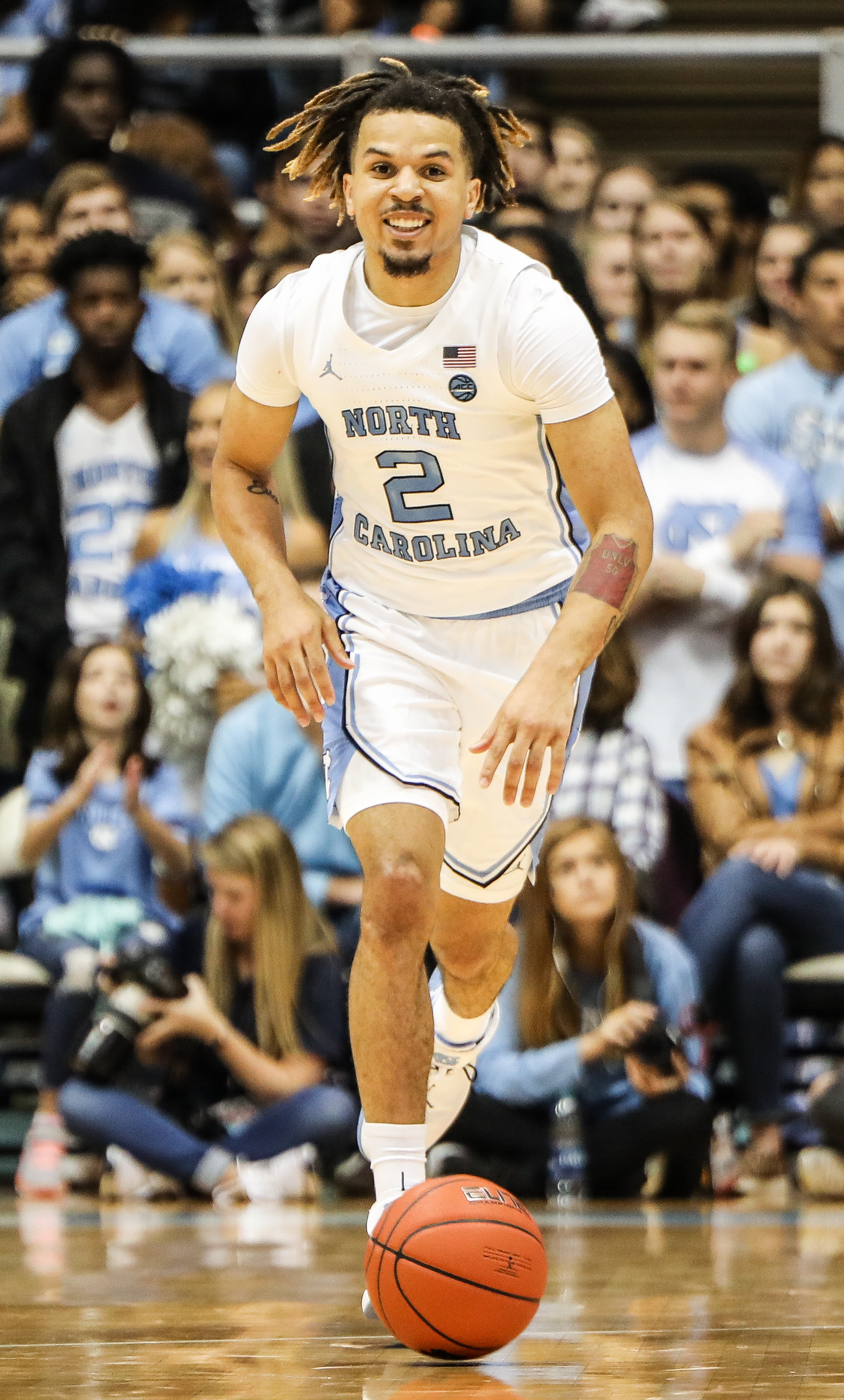
Anthony with the North Carolina Tar Heels in 2019

On November 6, 2019, in his regular-season debut for North Carolina, Anthony had 34 points, 11 rebounds, and five assists to lead his team to a 76–65 victory over Notre Dame. During the game, he surpassed the program record for most points in a freshman season debut, previously held by Rashad McCants since 2002, and set the Atlantic Coast Conference (ACC) record for points in a freshman season debut, previously held by Duke's RJ Barrett since 2018. On November 11, Anthony was named ACC Player and Freshman of the Week after averaging 27 points, 10.5 rebounds and 4 assists in wins over Notre Dame and UNC Wilmington. On November 15, he scored a team-high 28 points in a 77–61 win over Gardner–Webb to become the first freshman in program history to score at least 20 points in his first three games.

On December 17, it was announced that Anthony was expected to miss four to six weeks after undergoing surgery for a partially torn meniscus in his right knee. He returned in a 71–70 loss to Boston College on February 1, 2020, leading all scorers with 26 points and recording 14 free throws, 5 rebounds and 3 assists. On February 8, Anthony had 24 points and 11 rebounds in a 98–96 overtime loss to seventh-ranked Duke. A week later, in a game against Virginia, he fell to the floor and began gushing blood from his head after being struck by an opposing player's elbow. He left the game for three minutes before returning with a bandage over his right eyebrow. On March 2, Anthony was recognized as ACC Freshman of the Week a second time after averaging 22 points, six assists and 3.5 rebounds per game in victories over NC State and Syracuse. At the conclusion of the regular season, he earned third-team All-ACC and the ACC All-Freshman Team honors. As a freshman, Anthony averaged 18.5 points, 5.7 rebounds and 4 assists per game in 22 appearances. His team finished with a 14–19 record, its first losing season under head coach Roy Williams. On April 17, 2020, Anthony declared for the 2020 NBA draft.

== Professional career ==
=== Orlando Magic (2020–2025) ===
Anthony was selected by the Orlando Magic with the 15th pick of the first round of the 2020 NBA draft. On November 21, 2020, the Magic announced that they had signed Anthony.

On January 20, 2021, Anthony put up 13 points, alongside a game-winning, buzzer-beating three-pointer in a 97–96 win against the Minnesota Timberwolves. On May 1, 2021, he posted a then career-high 26 points along with a game-winning three-pointer with 0.1 seconds remaining to defeat the Memphis Grizzlies. On May 16, 2021, Anthony became the first Magic rookie to score 30-plus points since Victor Oladipo tallied 30 on February 21, 2014, against the New York Knicks and it was the fifth-highest-scoring performance by a rookie in team history. Anthony concluded his rookie campaign with four 20-plus-point games, 19 double-digit-scoring games in Orlando's last 22 contests and two game-winning three-point buzzer-beaters.

During the first few months of the 2021–22 NBA season, Anthony was discussed as a Most Improved Player award candidate.

On October 26, 2022, Anthony was sidelined with a right internal oblique muscle injury. On December 29, he was suspended by the NBA for one game without pay due to coming off the bench during an altercation in a game against the Detroit Pistons the day before.

On October 23, 2023, Anthony signed a three-year, $39 million extension with the Magic.

On April 15, 2025, Anthony scored a team-high 26 points, alongside three rebounds and six assists, in a 120–95 play-in tournament win over the Atlanta Hawks. The win gave the Magic the seventh seed in the NBA playoffs.

=== Milwaukee Bucks (2025–2026) ===
On June 15, 2025, Anthony was traded, alongside Kentavious Caldwell-Pope, four unprotected first-round picks including the 16th overall pick in the 2025 NBA draft, and a 2029 first-round pick swap, to the Memphis Grizzlies in exchange for Desmond Bane. Before appearing in a game for the Grizzlies, Anthony was waived after a contract buyout agreement on July 12. On July 16, Anthony signed with the Milwaukee Bucks. He made 35 appearances off of the bench for Milwaukee during the 2025–26 NBA season, averaging 6.7 points, 2.5 rebounds, and 3.5 assists.

On February 5, 2026, Anthony was traded to the Phoenix Suns in a three-team trade involving the Chicago Bulls. Anthony was waived by the Suns on February 27, without appearing in a game for the team.

=== Melbourne United (2026–present) ===
On August 5, 2026, Anthony signed with Melbourne United of the Australian National Basketball League (NBL) for the 2026–27 season. In his debut on September 19, he scored 30 points off the bench in a 97–95 loss to the Adelaide 36ers. On October 3, he scored 40 points in a 107–95 loss to the Cairns Taipans. On November 14, he scored 39 points in a 102–95 win over the South East Melbourne Phoenix. Late in the game, Cole was ejected after being assessed a flagrant foul, having already received a technical foul earlier in the contest. He was subsequently fined $10,000 and suspended for one match.

== National team career ==
Anthony played for the United States at the 2018 FIBA Under-18 Americas Championship in St. Catharines, Ontario. In the final, he scored a team-high 18 points in a 113–74 win over Canada to win the gold medal. After averaging 14.3 points and 4.2 assists per game, he was named to the all-tournament team. Anthony took part in the USA Basketball men's junior national team October minicamp in 2016 and 2018.

== Career statistics ==
Legend
GP	Games played	GS	Games started	MPG	Minutes per game
FG%	Field goal percentage	3P%	3-point field goal percentage	FT%	Free throw percentage
RPG	Rebounds per game	APG	Assists per game	SPG	Steals per game
BPG	Blocks per game	PPG	Points per game	**Bold**	Career high

=== NBA ===
==== Regular season ====
Year	Team	GP	GS	MPG	FG%	3P%	FT%	RPG	APG	SPG	BPG	PPG
2020–21	Orlando	47	34	27.1	.397	.337	.832	4.7	4.1	.6	.4	12.9
2021–22	Orlando	65	**65**	**31.7**	.391	.338	.854	**5.4**	**5.7**	.7	.3	**16.3**
2022–23	Orlando	60	4	25.9	**.454**	**.364**	**.894**	4.8	3.9	.6	**.5**	13.0
2023–24	Orlando	**81**	0	22.4	.435	.338	.826	3.8	2.9	**.8**	**.5**	11.6
2024–25	Orlando	67	22	18.4	.424	.353	.823	3.0	2.9	.7	**.5**	9.4
2025–26	Milwaukee	35	0	15.1	.424	.306	.615	2.5	3.5	.6	.3	6.7
Career		355	125	23.8	.419	.343	.841	4.1	3.8	.7	.4	12.0

==== Playoffs ====
Year	Team	GP	GS	MPG	FG%	3P%	FT%	RPG	APG	SPG	BPG	PPG
2024	Orlando	**7**	0	**14.7**	**.317**	**.154**	**.889**	**2.1**	**1.3**	**.6**	.1	**5.1**
2025	Orlando	5	0	10.2	.286	.000	.750	1.4	1.2	.0	**.2**	2.2
Career		12	0	12.8	.309	.105	.846	1.8	1.3	.3	.2	3.9

=== College ===
Year	Team	GP	GS	MPG	FG%	3P%	FT%	RPG	APG	SPG	BPG	PPG
2019–20	North Carolina	22	20	34.9	.380	.348	.750	5.7	4.0	1.3	.3	18.5

== Personal life ==
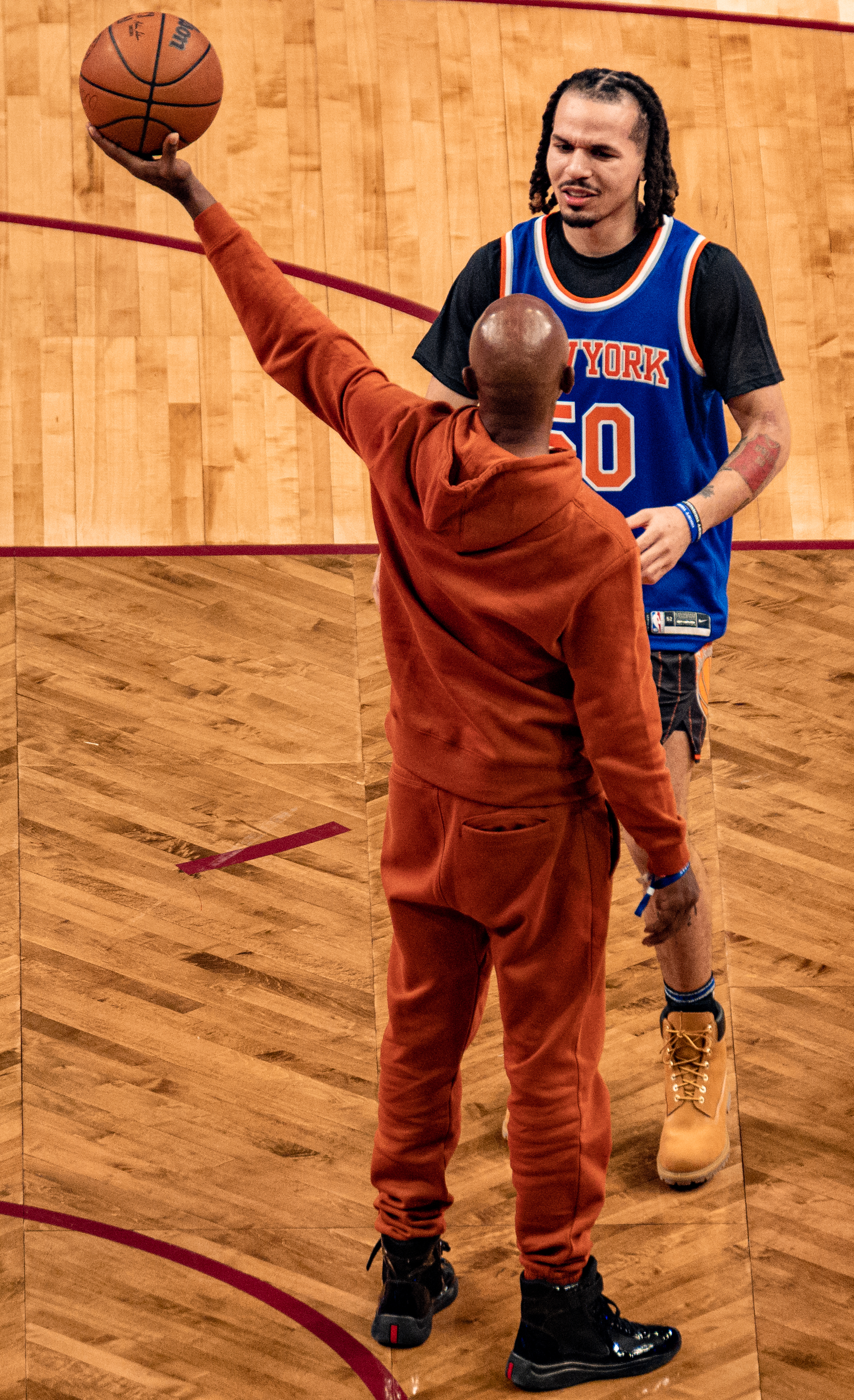
Anthony with his father, Greg, during the 2022 NBA Slam Dunk Contest

Anthony is the son of Greg Anthony and Crystal McCrary and the stepson of Raymond McGuire. Greg Anthony was a member of the 1989–90 UNLV national championship team and played in the National Basketball Association (NBA) for 11 seasons, before joining NBA TV and Turner Sports as an analyst and broadcaster. Crystal McCrary worked as a lawyer before becoming an author and filmmaker. McGuire is a Wall Street banking executive who ran in the Democratic primary for mayor of New York City.

== See also ==
- List of second-generation NBA players
- List of All-Atlantic Coast Conference men's basketball teams
