= Crystal McCrary =

American writer (born 1969)

Crystal McCrary McGuire
- Born: Crystal McCrary; October 24, 1969 (age 57); Detroit, Michigan
- Education: University of Michigan; New York University School of Law; Washington College of Law
- Occupations: Attorney, filmmaker, author
- Spouse(s): Greg Anthony (div.); Ray McGuire
- Children: 3, including Cole Anthony

Crystal McCrary McGuire (formerly Anthony; born October 24, 1969) is a writer, film producer and director, a former attorney and a broadcast personality. She is a creator and producer of entertainment content, including award-winning BET Networks shows Leading Women and Leading Men and youth basketball documentary Little Ballers.

== Biography ==
She was born in October 24, 1969, in Detroit, Michigan, to Magellan Gomez McCrary and Thelma Barrington, and into a family that includes 10 lawyers. She has one sister. After receiving a bachelor's degree magna cum laude, in 1991 from the University of Michigan, she attended the Washington College of Law at the American University in Washington, DC, and the New York University School of Law, earning her J.D. degree in 1995. During law school, she also joined the international law program sponsored by Tulane University, studying European Community law in Paris, France.

== Career ==
=== Attorney ===
She began her legal career as an associate at New York City law firm Paul, Weiss, Rifkind, Wharton & Garrison, where she represented entertainment personalities and executives, such as Andrew Lloyd Webber, as an entertainment lawyer, while quietly authoring a novel that reflects the milieu. In 1997, she transitioned to writing, resigning her position as an attorney.

=== Author ===
A story creator since childhood, she co-wrote the novel Homecourt Advantage with Rita Ewing (then spouse of New York Knicks center Patrick Ewing), an intimate portrait of the "dysfunctional off-court lives of multimillionaire athletes and their significant others", according to Washington Post reviewer Kevin Merida, in 1998. It became a bestseller, and film rights to the book were purchased by "a film triad that includes Wesley Snipes' production company."

Her second work, Gotham Diaries, grew out of a collaboration with Tonya Lewis Lee, who is also a lawyer, and the spouse of filmmaker Spike Lee. First envisioned as a television series that would profile upper-class black New Yorkers, the pair shifted to realizing the story, Gotham Diaries, in 2004, as a social satire novel, due to events of 9/11 disrupting plans. The book won Blackboard Fiction Book of the Year in 2005, and returned her to The New York Times Bestseller List. Gotham Diaries is also noted for contributing to an emerging genre of fiction, "black chick-lit".

In 2012, her book, Inspiration: Profiles of Black Women Changing Our World with her producing partner Nathan Hale Williams and photography by Lauri Lyons was published. She has also authored numerous magazine articles.

=== Entertainment industry ===
She began a film career in 2006, as an executive producer, with Nathan Hale Williams, for the feature film Dirty Laundry, which offers a perspective on homosexuality in Southern African-American families, winning top honors, including Best Feature Film award, at the American Black Film Festival in 2007. That year, when listed among the top 40 Under 40 by Crain’s New York Business, Williams affectionately referred to McCrary McGuire as "a baby mogul in training". In 2008, the film was nominated for a GLAAD Award.

McCrary has developed projects with BET Networks, co-hosted My Two Cents, and served as executive producer, in 2006, for reality show My Model Is Better Than Your Model, and for the series Real-Life Divas, which profiles African-American women and ran for four seasons. She was executive producer for documentary series Leading Women and Leading Men, which earned an NAACP Image Award nomination in 2009. In 2015, she was commissioned to make a short film to commemorate the 75th anniversary of the NAACP Legal Defense Fund.

She has been featured in People, Essence and Newsweek, and has also appeared as herself in a variety of productions, including Today, Good Morning America, The Big Idea with Donny Deutsch, in 2006, The Sisterhood of the Traveling Pants 2, in 2008, Closet Envy, in 2010, and Girls Who Like Boys Who Like Boys, during 2010 to 2011. She appeared as a pop-culture commentator on American Morning for CNN in 2004 and 2005. and on Verdict with Dan Abrams for NBC, in 2008, alongside Pat Buchanan and Lawrence O'Donnell, as a guest host for The View, and as a legal analyst for CNBC, Fox News, and Court TV (now truTV).

Her directorial debut was the AAU youth basketball documentary Little Ballers in 2013, which she also co-produced; it was televised by Nickelodeon in 2015, the first documentary to be aired on NickSports. In 2017, Nickelodeon premiered her three-part docuseries, Little Ballers Indiana, which chronicles six diverse, fledgling female basketball players in the hometown of WNBA player Skylar Diggins, South Bend, Indiana.

In 2021, HBO Max premiered a reboot of Sex and the City, titled And Just Like That..., which introduced a recurring new character reportedly inspired by McCrary McGuire, named "Lisa Todd Wexley".

== Personal life ==
McCrary was formerly married NBA player Greg Anthony, with whom she had two children, including Orlando Magic point guard Cole Anthony. She later married former Wall Street executive Ray McGuire, whom she joined on the 2021 New York City mayoral campaign trail. They have one son together.
