= John C. Babcock =

American architect

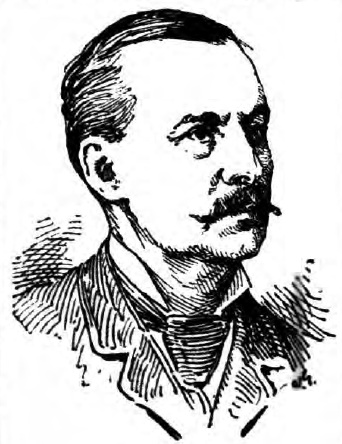
John C. Babcock (circa 1890)

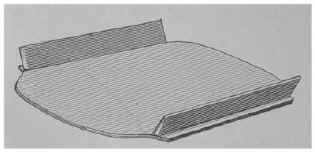
Babcock's Sliding Seat Invention for Rowing (1869)

John C. Babcock (September 6, 1836 – November 20, 1908) was an amateur rower, a member of the secret service for the Union Army during the Civil War, and a founder of the New York Athletic Club.

== Early life ==
Babcock was born in Warwick, Rhode Island, and his family moved to Chicago In 1855. Babcock worked for one of the largest architectural firms in Chicago, and he contributed to the designs of numerous Athenian mansions on the Millionaire's Row along Michigan Avenue.

== Civil War service ==
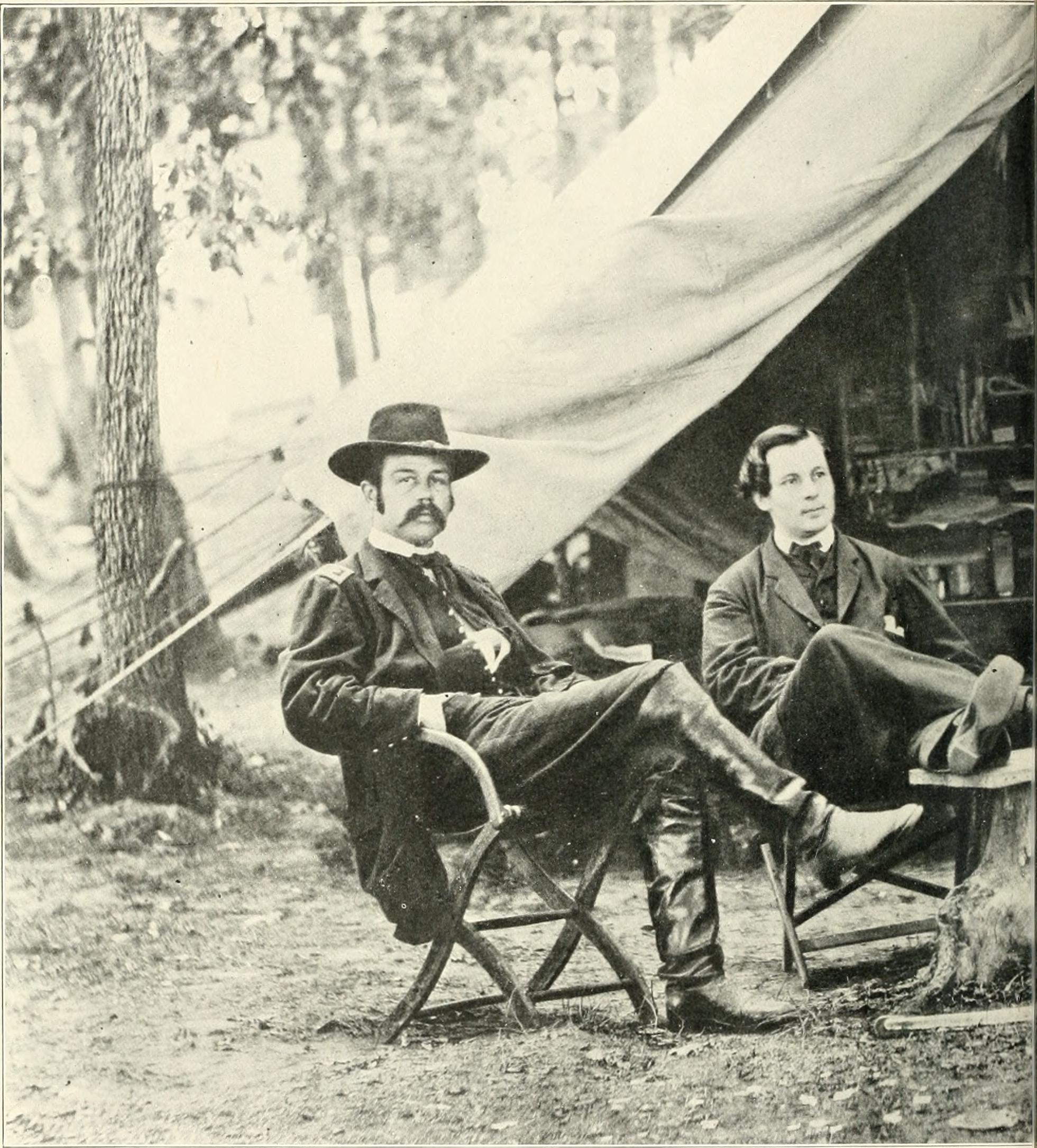
Babcock (right) and Col. George H. Sharpe, head of the Military Information

Babcock served the entire Civil War. Initially, Babcock volunteered for the Sturgis Rifles as an enlisted soldier in 1861, but he soon was offered a civilian position to be a principal scout for the Army of the Potomac. Babcock became a skilled interrogator of captured Confederates. In 1862, Babcock worked as a Confederate order-of-battle expert with the Topographical Department under Allan Pinkerton and made maps for General George B. McClellan. In one of his reports, Babcock's estimate of enemy forces was off by less than one percent. Early in 1863, Babcock joined the Bureau of Military Information under Colonel George H. Sharpe to gather intelligence. While in this secret service, Babcock provided detailed maps for aeronaut Thaddeus S. C. Lowe, who made frequent balloon flights to obtain tactical intelligence. In 1863, Babcock discovered Robert E. Lee's forward movement, which helped end the Battle of Gettysburg. At the Battle of Appomattox Court House in 1865, Babcock found General Lee under an apple tree and facilitated the surrender of the Confederate States Army. Even though he was a civilian, Babcock was unofficially called "Captain Babcock" and then later "Colonel Babcock".

== Rowing legacy ==
Babcock was a rowing innovator and one of the most active people in the rowing community during his lifetime. In 1857, he and his friend William Buckingham Curtis organized the Metropolitan Rowing Club of Chicago, which was the first amateur rowing and racing club in the West. In the summer of 1857, Babcock invented the tracked sliding seat for his sculling boat and perfected it by 1870. In 1859, he and Curtis won every rowing event in the annual games at the Chicago Caledonian Club. During the winter of 1869/1870, Babcock created the first indoor rowing machine. In 1872, Babcock wrote the bylaws and helped create the National Association of Amateur Oarsmen (NAAO). He was the first president of the NAAO, which later became the United States Rowing Association (USRowing). With Harry Buermeyer and Curtis, Babcock helped found the New York Athletic Club (NYAC) in 1868. Babcock was the first elected vice-president of the NYAC, where he encouraged the separation of amateur and professional athletics.

== Post-war career ==
After the war Babcock returned to architecture, establishing a practice in New York City by 1868. Circa 1881 he formed a partnership with fellow architect Thomas H. McAvoy, though Babcock & McAvoy lasted only until McAvoy's death in 1887. Circa 1891 Babcock was in partnership with a Mr. Morgan as Babcock & Morgan. Babcock then practiced alone until a few years before his death. He made a specialty of apartments and tenements.

Extant works by Babcock and his partners in New York City include 67 Ludlow Street (1884, with McAvoy), and 36 Hudson Street (1891–92, with Morgan). Outside the city, he was responsible for the rebuilding of the Episcopal Church of St. John the Less at Scarsdale, New York (1882–83, with McAvoy). One of his largest projects was an apartment house named the Albany (1874). Located at 215 West 51st Street and now demolished, this was one of the first large apartment buildings built in New York.
