= 2018 USA Team Handball Nationals – men's elite division =

2018 USA Team Handball Nationals - Men's Elite Division
- Season: 2017–18
- Dates: 17 - 20 May 2018
- Matches played: 20
- All statistics correct as of 2018-05-10.

The 2018 Nationals was the 48th Men's Nationals. The Nationals was a team handball tournament to determine the National Champion from 2018 from the US.

== Venues ==
The championship was played at venues at the Myrtle Beach Sports Center in Myrtle Beach, South Carolina.

Location of the Myrtle Beach Sports Center

== Qualification ==
Competition	Dates	Vacancies	Qualified	Wildcard standings
2017 Nationals - Men's Elite Division	19 - 21 Mai 2017	1	New York City Team Handball Club	12
2017-18 Northeast Team Handball League	18 November 2017 – 22 April 2018	2	DC Diplomats Team Handball; Boston Team Handball	11; 5
2017-18 Midwest Team Handball League	30 September 2017 - 18 March 2018	1	Chicago Inter Handball Club	26
Wildcards		4	San Francisco CalHeat Team Handball Club; New York Athletic Club; West Point Black; Houston Firehawks Team Handball; Los Angeles Team Handball Club	20; 16; 11 each 9 each 9

The Air Force Academy which ranked 3rd at the Wildcard Standings will not attending the competition.

== Modus ==
Location of 2018 USA Team Handball Nationals Men's Elite Division Teams
The two green dots teams have two play a Playoff first

First there is a playoff game between Houston Firehawks and Los Angeles THC for the last wildcard. The loser play in the Open Division

After that the eight teams are split in two pools A and B and they play a round roubin.

The last two teams per group were qualified for the 5-8th place semifinals.

The losers from the 5-8th place semis played a 7th place game and the winners the 5th place game.

The best two teams per group were qualified for the semifinals.

The losers from the semis played a small final and the winners the final.

== Results ==
=== 4th Wildcard Playoff ===
17 Mai 2018; 17:00 (UTC-4)	Houston Firehawks	10-0	Los Angeles	Court 2, Myrtle Beach Sports Center
17 Mai 2018; 17:00 (UTC-4)		Report		Court 2, Myrtle Beach Sports Center

=== Group stage ===
==== Group A ====
Team	Pld	W	D	L	GF	GA	GD	Pts
New York City (1)	3	3	0	0	89	67	+22	6
San Francisco CalHeat (5)	3	2	0	1	80	78	+2	4
Chicago Inter (3)	3	1	0	2	76	88	−12	2
West Point Black (7)	3	0	0	3	82	94	−12	0

17 Mai 2018; 17:00 (UTC-4)	Chicago Inter	24-33	San Francisco CalHeat	Court 1, Myrtle Beach Sports Center
17 Mai 2018; 17:00 (UTC-4)		Report		Court 1, Myrtle Beach Sports Center

18 Mai 2018; 9:15 (UTC-4)	Chicago Inter	32-25	West Point Black	Court 1, Myrtle Beach Sports Center
18 Mai 2018; 9:15 (UTC-4)		Report		Court 1, Myrtle Beach Sports Center

18 Mai 2018; 9:15 (UTC-4)	New York City	26-18	San Francisco CalHeat	Court 2, Myrtle Beach Sports Center
18 Mai 2018; 9:15 (UTC-4)		Report		Court 2, Myrtle Beach Sports Center

18 Mai 2018; 14:30 (UTC-4)	Chicago Inter	20-30	New York City	Court 2, Myrtle Beach Sports Center
18 Mai 2018; 14:30 (UTC-4)		Report		Court 2, Myrtle Beach Sports Center

18 Mai 2018; 15:45 (UTC-4)	San Francisco CalHeat	29-28	West Point Black	Court 4, Myrtle Beach Sports Center
18 Mai 2018; 15:45 (UTC-4)		Report		Court 4, Myrtle Beach Sports Center

19 Mai 2018; 10:30 (UTC-4)	West Point Black	29-33	New York City	Court 4, Myrtle Beach Sports Center
19 Mai 2018; 10:30 (UTC-4)		Report		Court 4, Myrtle Beach Sports Center

==== Group B ====
Team	Pld	W	D	L	GF	GA	GD	Pts
New York Athletic Club (2)	3	3	0	0	93	77	+16	6
Boston (6)	3	2	0	1	68	66	+2	4
Houston Firehawks (8)	3	1	0	2	80	87	−7	2
DC Diplomats (4)	3	0	0	3	69	80	−11	0

17 Mai 2018; 17:00 (UTC-4)	Boston	21-17	DC Diplomats	Court 4, Myrtle Beach Sports Center
17 Mai 2018; 17:00 (UTC-4)		Report		Court 4, Myrtle Beach Sports Center

17 Mai 2018; 21:00 (UTC-4)	New York Athletic Club	35-30	Houston Firehawks	Court 2, Myrtle Beach Sports Center
17 Mai 2018; 21:00 (UTC-4)		Report		Court 2, Myrtle Beach Sports Center

18 Mai 2018; 10:30 (UTC-4)	Boston	29-25	Houston Firehawks	Court 3, Myrtle Beach Sports Center
18 Mai 2018; 10:30 (UTC-4)		Report		Court 3, Myrtle Beach Sports Center

18 Mai 2018; 10:30 (UTC-4)	DC Diplomats	29-34	New York Athletic Club	Court 4, Myrtle Beach Sports Center
18 Mai 2018; 10:30 (UTC-4)		Report		Court 4, Myrtle Beach Sports Center

18 Mai 2018; 15:45 (UTC-4)	Boston	18-24	New York Athletic Club	Court 3, Myrtle Beach Sports Center
18 Mai 2018; 15:45 (UTC-4)		Report		Court 3, Myrtle Beach Sports Center

18 Mai 2018; 16:00 (UTC-4)	Houston Firehawks	25-23	DC Diplomats	Court 2, Myrtle Beach Sports Center
18 Mai 2018; 16:00 (UTC-4)		Report		Court 2, Myrtle Beach Sports Center

=== Championship ===
Semifinals
A1	New York City	23
B2	Boston	19
B1	New York Athletic Club	37
A2	San Francisco CalHeat	38

Final
A1	New York City	31
A2	San Francisco CalHeat	18
Small Final
B2	Boston	25
B1	New York Athletic Club	34

==== Semifinals ====
19 Mai 2018; 14:30 (UTC-4)	New York City	23-19	Boston	Court 2, Myrtle Beach Sports Center
19 Mai 2018; 14:30 (UTC-4)		Report		Court 2, Myrtle Beach Sports Center

19 Mai 2018
16:00 (UTC-4)
New York Athletic Club
37-38 (ET)
San Francisco CalHeat
Court 2, Myrtle Beach Sports Center

Report

FT: yes ET: yes Pen: yes

==== Small Final ====
20 Mai 2018; 11:00 (UTC-4)	Boston	25-34	New York Athletic Club	Court 4, Myrtle Beach Sports Center
20 Mai 2018; 11:00 (UTC-4)		Report		Court 4, Myrtle Beach Sports Center

==== Final ====
20 Mai 2018; 13:30 (UTC-4)	New York City	31-18	San Francisco CalHeat	Court 2, Myrtle Beach Sports Center
20 Mai 2018; 13:30 (UTC-4)		Report		Court 2, Myrtle Beach Sports Center

=== Consolation ===
5-8th Place Semifinals
A3	Chicago Inter	36
B4	DC Diplomats	22
B3	Houston Firehawks	35
A4	West Point Black	30

5th Place
A3	Chicago Inter	35
B3	Houston Firehawks	29
7th Place
B4	DC Diplomats	37
A4	West Point Black	29

==== 5-8th Place Semifinals ====
19 Mai 2018; 14:30 (UTC-4)	Chicago Inter	36-22	DC Diplomats	Court 3, Myrtle Beach Sports Center
19 Mai 2018; 14:30 (UTC-4)		Report		Court 3, Myrtle Beach Sports Center

19 Mai 2018; 14:30 (UTC-4)	Houston Firehawks	35-30	West Point Black	Court 4, Myrtle Beach Sports Center
19 Mai 2018; 14:30 (UTC-4)		Report		Court 4, Myrtle Beach Sports Center

==== 7th Place ====
20 Mai 2018; 8:00 (UTC-4)	DC Diplomats	37-29	West Point Black	Court 4, Myrtle Beach Sports Center
20 Mai 2018; 8:00 (UTC-4)		Report		Court 4, Myrtle Beach Sports Center

==== 5th Place ====
20 Mai 2018; 9:30 (UTC-4)	Chicago Inter	35-29	Houston Firehawks	Court 4, Myrtle Beach Sports Center
20 Mai 2018; 9:30 (UTC-4)		Report		Court 4, Myrtle Beach Sports Center

== Final ranking ==
Rank	Team
1st place, gold medalist(s)	New York City
2nd place, silver medalist(s)	San Francisco CalHeat
3rd place, bronze medalist(s)	New York Athletic Club
4	Boston
5	Chicago Inter
6	Houston Firehawks
7	DC Diplomats
8	West Point Black

== Statistics ==
=== Awards ===
Most Valuable Player:	Djordje Radovanovic	New York City THC
Most Valuable Goalkeeper:	Ivan Ignjatovic	New York City THC
Top Scorer:	Philip Altong	Houston Firehawks

=== Top scorers ===
Rank	Name	Goals	Games	Average	Team
1st place, gold medalist(s)	Philip Altong	45	6	7.5	Houston Firehawks
2nd place, silver medalist(s)	Jan Ziegler	39	5	7.8	DC Diplomats
3rd place, bronze medalist(s)	Stefan Asceric	37	5	7.4	Chicago Inter
4	Nicholas Schebler	36	5	7.2	West Point Black
5	Ty Reed	35	5	7	New York Athletic Club
6	Jawad Bichri	33	5	6.6	Boston
7	Philipp Wieschollek	32	5	5.33	Houston Firehawks
8	Lars Schorlemer	29	5	5.8	San Francisco CalHeat
9	Eloy Rubio Blanco	29	5	5.8	Chicago Inter
10	El-Sayed Shalaby	27	5	5.4	New York City THC

=== All-Tournament Team ===
Pivot

Vladimir Bicvic

New York City

Center Back

Left Back
Slave Jovanovski
Right Back

Lars Schorlemer
San Francisco CalHeat
Benjamin Briffe

San Francisco CalHeat

New York City

Left Wing

Goalkeeper

Right Wing
Thomas Harper

Ivan Ignjatovic

Djordje Radovanovic
New York Athletic Club

New York City

New York City

Most Valuable Goalkeeper

Most Valuable Player
