= Harry Buermeyer =

American athlete

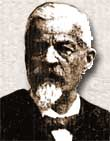
Harry Buermeyer, circa 1920

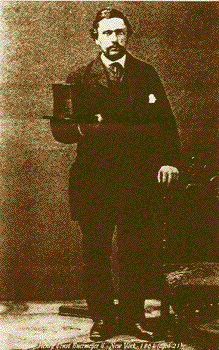
Harry Buermeyer, 1861

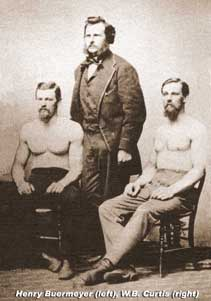
Harry Buermeyer (left) and Bill Curtis (right), circa 1870

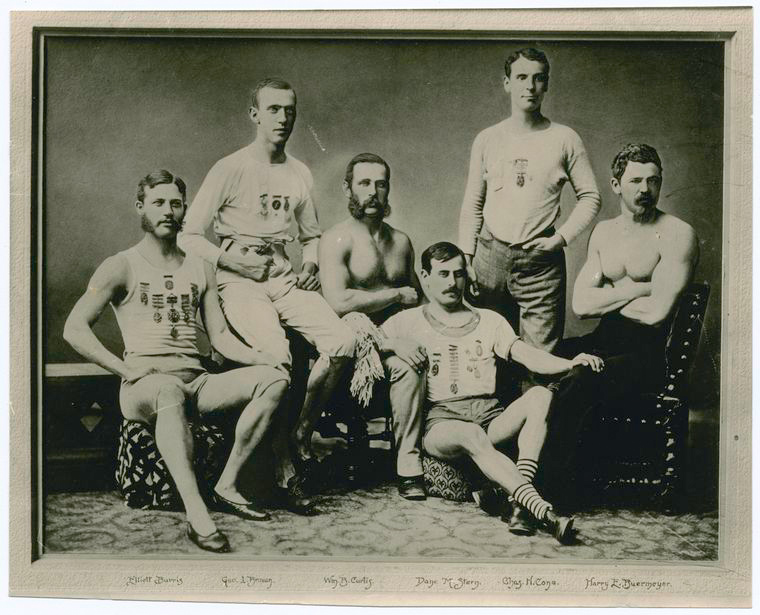
N.Y.A.C. Track Team, Harry Buermeyer (right), circa 1873

Henry Ernest (Harry) Buermeyer II (August 19, 1839 – October 10, 1922) was an American athlete in the late 1800s and is considered a "father of American athletics" due to his major contributions towards the growth of amateur sports throughout North America. James Edward Sullivan described him as “one of the strongest athletes the world ever had”. After being wounded in the legs twice in the Civil War, Harry won numerous national championships in swimming, running, shot put, and boxing, and he was an avid rower and weightlifter throughout his life.

== Early life ==
Harry was born in New York City, as the son of German immigrants. His father, Ernst Henrich, was a hotelkeeper at Fraunces Tavern. At age sixteen, Harry won his first rowing race around Ellis Island. At eighteen, he gained fame as the best all-around athlete in New York. He was educated at the Mechanics Institute School and graduated in 1854.

Harry enlisted in the Union Army in May 1861 and fought in the Civil War. He was the unofficial boxing champion of his regiment. Harry was wounded in the foot at the Battle of Antietam in 1862, and he almost lost a leg when he was shot at the Battle of Spotsylvania Court House in 1864. After he recovered, Harry left the army to focus on athletics. In 1876, he wed Mary Carroll, an exceptional swimmer and weightlifter and one of the first women to ride a bicycle in the United States.

== Career ==
Harry was the first recorded national winner of the 100 yard dash in America in 1871. In 1873, he won the gymnastic and all-around athletic title. Harry was the first recorded national shot put champion in 1876. In 1878, he was the first heavyweight boxing champion in America, recording the first official knockout at Madison Square Garden. Harry was considered one of the strongest men of his time.

Harry, his longtime friend William Buckingham Curtis, and John C. Babcock were the three principal founders of the New York Athletic Club (N.Y.A.C.) in 1868. Harry was the first Treasurer of the club, and he was captain of the N.Y.A.C. track team in 1873. In 1878, Harry and Curtis helped found the Amateur Athletic Union, which eventually became the U.S. Olympic Committee.

Around 1880, Harry and Curtis also started the Fresh Air Club, encouraging open river ice skating and strenuous multiple-day hiking excursions. The Fresh Air Club was incorporated in 1890, making it the oldest walking club in New York., and Harry served as President of the club in 1900.

In 1900, Harry was elected as President of the National Skating Association, a forerunner to US Speedskating. He was a judge and referee in the 1904 St. Louis Olympics. In 1912, Harry carried the American flag as the only invited guest to accompany the American athletes into the Stadium at the Stockholm Olympic Games. After returning from Stockholm, Harry marched in the Welcome Home Parade as an honored guest and the oldest athletic champion in America.

The "Buermeyer 500" race was created in New York City in 1915 to commemorate him as one of the city’s most recognized athletes, and the race was held annually for over 40 years after his death. In his honor, the N.Y.A.C . for several years held an annual "Buermeyer Cup", where a trophy was awarded to the best gunner at 50 targets scratch.

== National Championship Highlights ==
- 1872 - 100 Yard Dash (first recorded national winner)
- 1873 - Gymnastics and All-Round Athletic Title
- 1876, 1877, and 1878 - Putting the Shot (shot put)
- 1877, 1878, and 1879 - Team Tug of War
- 1878 - Heavyweight Boxing Champion (first amateur boxing championship in the United States, at Madison Square Garden)
