= New York Athletic Club =

Private social club

New York A.C.
- New York Athletic Club

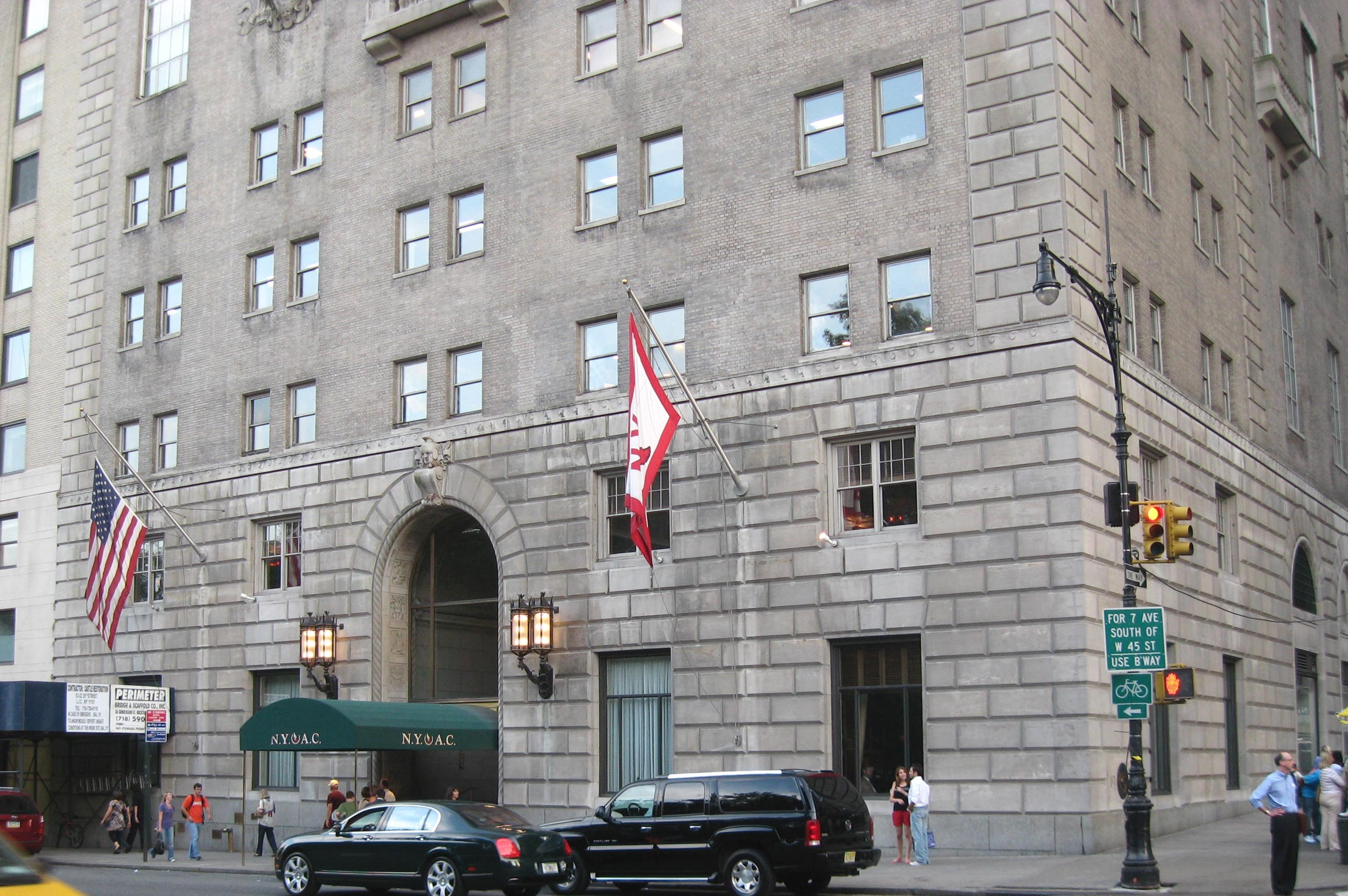
- NYAC headquarters in Manhattan
- Abbreviation: NYAC
- Formation: September 8, 1868; 158 years ago
- Founder: John C. Babcock; Harry Buermeyer; William Buckingham Curtis
- Type: Private social and sports club
- Headquarters: 180 Central Park South; Manhattan, New York
- Location(s): 180 Central Park South, Manhattan; Travers Island, Westchester County
- Coordinates: 40°45′59″N 73°58′44″W
- Region served: Metropolitan New York
- President: Edward A. Smith
- Website: nyac.org

The New York Athletic Club is a private social and sports club in New York state. Founded in 1868, the club has approximately 8,600 members and two facilities: the City House, located at 180 Central Park South in Manhattan, and Travers Island, located in Westchester County. Membership in the club is by invitation only.

The club offers many sports, including rowing, wrestling, boxing, judo, fencing, swimming, basketball, rugby union, soccer, tennis, handball, squash, snooker, lacrosse and water polo.

The NYAC has tax status 501(c)(7) for Social and Recreation Clubs; in 2024 it claimed total revenue of $70,874,472, total giving of $659,245, and total assets of $92,426,900.

== History ==
In 1866, William Buckingham Curtis, Harry Buermeyer, and John C. Babcock opened a gymnasium on the corner of 6th Avenue and 14th Street in their New York City apartment, after discussing the rapid rise of organized athletics in England. Interest in their gym grew, and the three men decided to found the New York Athletic Club on September 8, 1868. The club was modeled after the London Athletic Club.

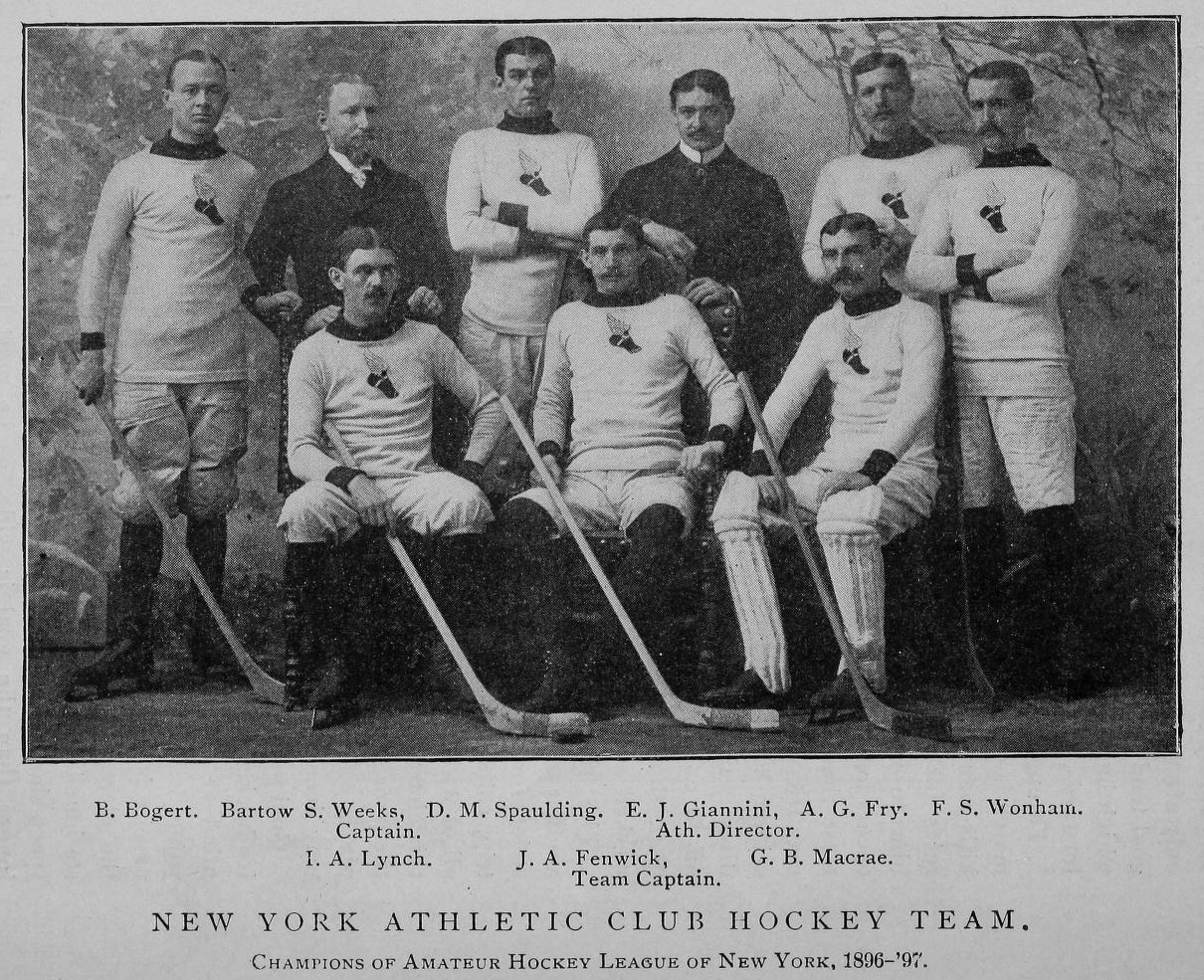
New York Athletic Club hockey team in the inaugural 1896–97 AAHL season

Their goal was to sponsor athletic competitions in the New York area, and to keep official records for different sports. The NYAC was established on September 8, 1868. Its Constitution and Bylaws were adopted in December 1868. In the beginning there was no initiation fee, but $10 was required for the first six months of dues.

The club obtained the Mott Haven grounds with cinder track in 1875. The Mott Haven grounds were used for several national athletic championships.

In 1879, when the club had 170 members, it published rules in various amateur sports, including fencing, sparring, and Greco-Roman wrestling. The NYAC can be considered the foundation for amateur athletics in the United States. It was the first organization to compile and apply a code of rules for the government of athletic meetings, the first to offer prizes for open amateur games, and the first to hold an amateur championship.

As of 2022, New York Athletic Club members have won 271 Olympic medals: 151 gold, 54 silver, and 66 bronze. NYAC athletes have competed at every modern Summer Olympics since 1896, with the exception of the 1980 Summer Olympics in Moscow, which the United States boycotted. 57 NYAC members competed for six countries at the 2020 Summer Olympics in Tokyo, winning medals in 10 events.

From 1896 to 1912 (a span counting 16 consecutive seasons) the New York Athletic Club had a team represented in the American Amateur Hockey League and played its games at the St. Nicholas Rink at 69 West 66th Street in Manhattan. The NYAC ice hockey branch won league championship honors four times: in 1896–97, 1897–98, 1908–09 and 1909–10. Canadian hockey player Tom Howard, who won the Stanley Cup with the Winnipeg Victorias in February 1896, played four season with the team between 1899 and 1903.

== Facilities ==
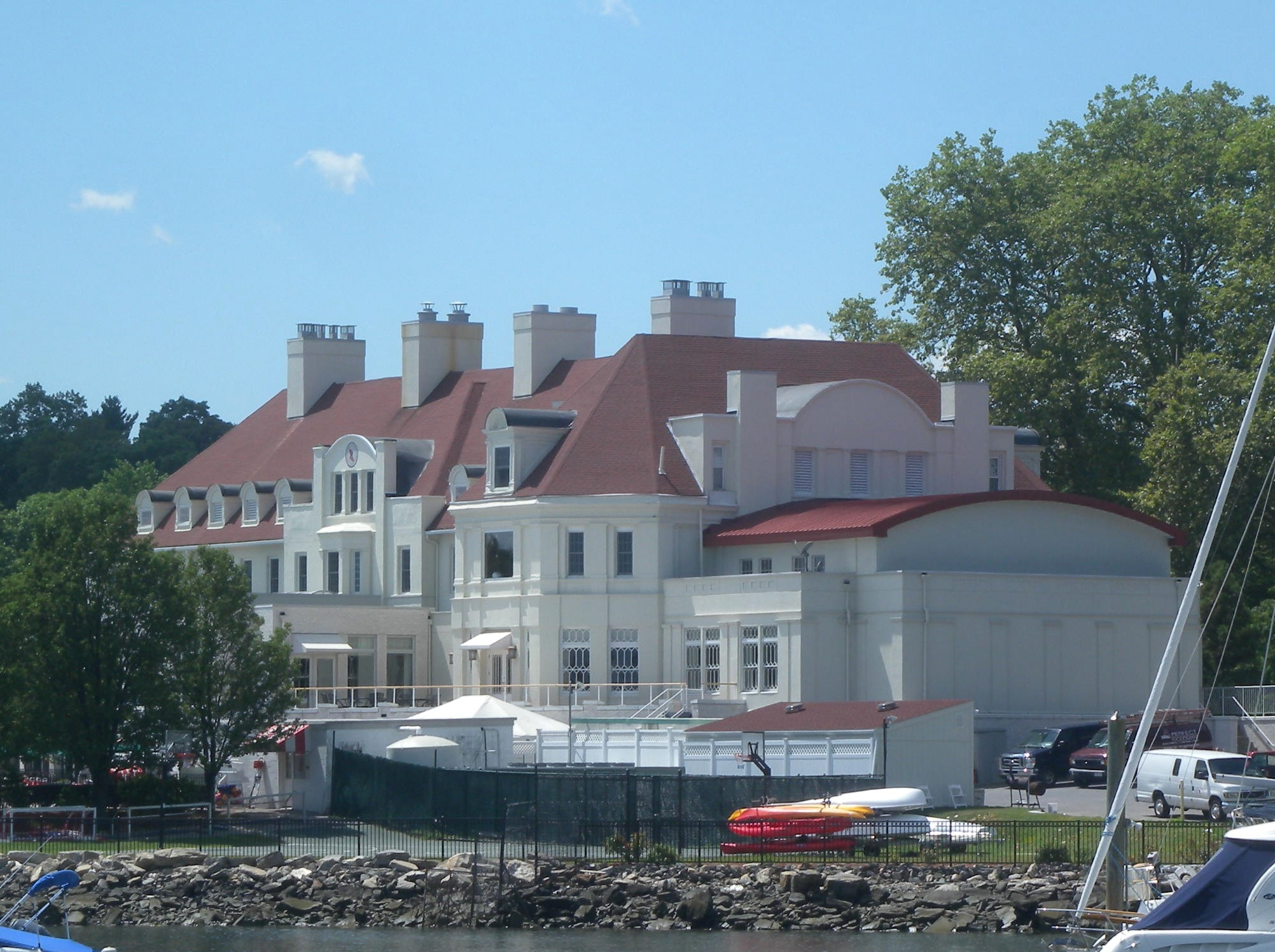
Travers Island main house

City House, located at 180 Central Park South, is the club's headquarters in Midtown Manhattan. Completed in 1929, City House is a 24-story building which offers panoramic views of Central Park. The building includes a swimming pool, gymnasium, basketball court, squash courts, golf simulators, a fencing and wrestling room, a judo hall, and two boxing rings. There are also leisure amenities for members and guests, including two restaurants, a cocktail lounge, and 187 overnight guest rooms.

Travers Island is the club's summer location in Westchester County. The island was named for New York Athletic Club president William R. Travers, who arranged for its purchase in 1888. Club amenities on Travers Island include a saltwater swimming pool, yacht club, rowing house, and tennis courts, situated on 33 acres (130,000 m^{2}) of landscaped grounds.

== Competitions ==
=== Mercury Cup series ===
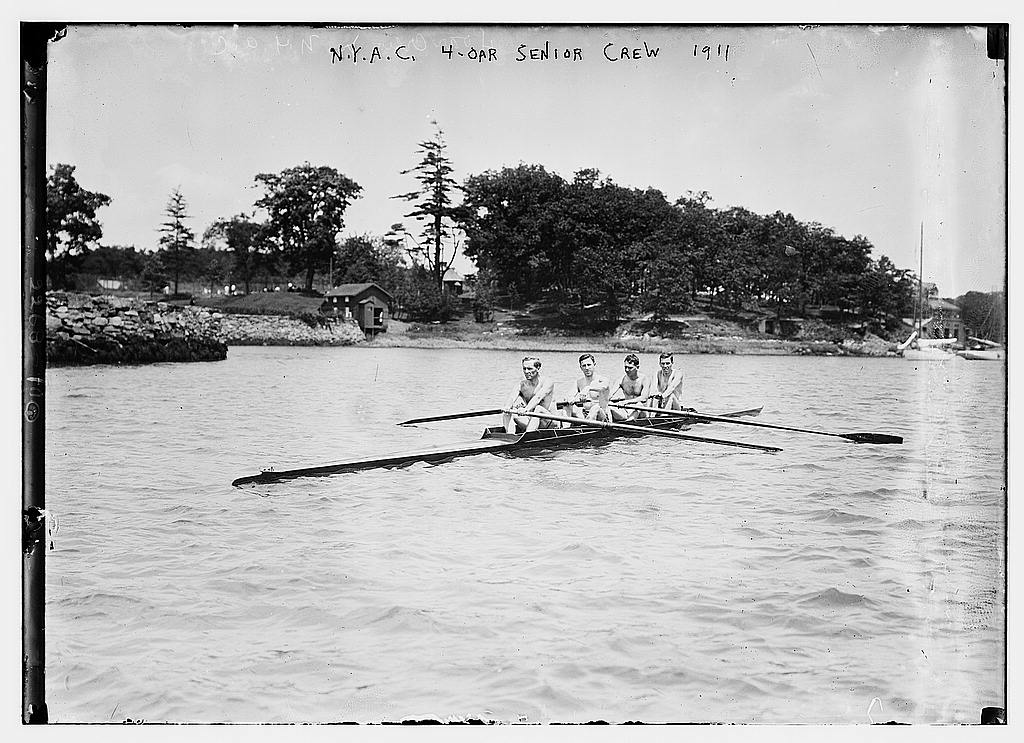
NYAC crew in 1911

The NYAC's Mercury Cup series is the premier regional fencing event in North America. The series includes a number of épée and sabre tournaments, ending each season with the "Epeepalooza" and "Sabrage" events. Competitors earn points based on final placements at each tournament, with the champion being the highest-ranked fencer at the conclusion of the season.

Mercury Cup champions

Season	Épée	Sabre
2005–2006	Alexander Abend	
2006–2007	Alexander Abend	
2007–2008	Alexander Abend	Sergey Isayenko
2008–2009	Jon Normile	Ben Igoe

Individual event champions

2005–2006 Épée series
Mercury Cup #1: Noah Zucker
Mercury Cup #2: Alexander Abend
Mercury Cup #3: Alexander Abend
Mercury Cup #4: Mykhaylo Mokretsov
Mercury Cup #5: Alexander Abend
Mercury Cup #6: Alex Tsinis

2006–2007 Épée series
Mercury Cup #1: Alexander Abend
Mercury Cup #2: Alexander Abend
Mercury Cup #3: Soren Thompson
Mercury Cup #4: Alexander Abend
Mercury Cup #5: Brendan Baby
Mercury Cup #6: Tommi Hurme

2007–2008 Épée series
Mercury Cup #1: Alexander Abend
Mercury Cup #2: Bas Verwijlen
Mercury Cup #3: Tommi Hurme
Mercury Cup #4: Jon Normile
Mercury Cup #5: Jon Normile

2008–2009 Épée series
Mercury Cup #1: Alex Tsinis
Mercury Cup #2: Jon Normile
Mercury Cup #3: Jon Normile

2007–2008 Sabre series
Mercury Cup #1: Sergey Isayenko
Mercury Cup #2: Ben Igoe
Mercury Cup #3: Sergey Isayenko

2008–2009 Sabre series
Mercury Cup #1: Ben Igoe
Mercury Cup #2: Ben Igoe
Mercury Cup #3: Daryl Homer

=== Other notable events ===
In November 2003, the club was the site of a four-game chess match between Garry Kasparov and the computer program X3D Fritz. In June 2004, the club played host to the final play-offs of the United States National Snooker Championship, and in May 2017 it played host to the entire event.

== Sports teams ==
The NYAC currently fields 22 different teams for the following sports:

- Basketball
- Boxing
- Fencing
- Handball
- Judo
- Lacrosse
- Rowing
- Rugby
- Soccer (men's, women's)
- Squash
- Swimming
- Team handball
- Track and field
- Triathlon
- Water polo
- Wrestling

=== Handball ===
The New York Athletic Club is record champion of the USA with 15 titles. The handball department was originally the Garden City Team Handball Club which joint NYAC around March 2006. Garden City was found by Laszlo Jurak around 1977. In 2011 a women's team was created as joint venture with Dynamo and they became third at the Nationals.

?	Not clear if participated
–	Did not participated

Team	First		Second
Year	Elite	Open Div. I	Open Div. I
1984	Did not exist until 2000	Unknown result	?
1985	Did not exist until 2000	?	?
1986	Did not exist until 2000	?	?
1987	Did not exist until 2000	2nd Place	?
1988	Did not exist until 2000	1st Place	?
1989	Did not exist until 2000	1st Place	?
1990	Did not exist until 2000	?	?
1991	Did not exist until 2000	1st Place	?
1992	Did not exist until 2000	1st Place	?
1993	Did not exist until 2000	2nd Place	1st Place
1994	Did not exist until 2000	2nd Place	?
1995	Did not exist until 2000	2nd Place	?
1996	Did not exist until 2000	1st Place	?
1997	Did not exist until 2000	1st Place	?
1998	Did not exist until 2000	2nd Place	?
1999	Did not exist until 2000	2nd Place	?
2000	2nd Place	–	–
2001	1st Place	–	–
2002	4th Place	–	–
2003	3rd Place	–	–
2004	2nd Place	–	–
2005	1st Place	–	–
2006	1st Place	–	–
2007	3rd Place	–	?
2008	Tournaments were cancelled		
2009	3rd Place	–	–
2010	DNQ	5th Place	–
2011	DNQ	1st Place	–
2012	DNQ	1st Place	–
2013	1st Place	–	–
2014	1st Place	–	–
2015	3rd Place	–	–
2016	1st Place	–	–
2017	3rd Place	–	–
2018	3rd Place	–	–
2019	3rd Place	–	–
2020	Tournaments were cancelled		
2021	Tournaments were cancelled		
2022	2nd Place	–	–
2023	3rd Place	–	–
2024	DNH	–	–

- Until 1999 the Open Div. I was the highest Championship in the USA. Since 2000 an Elite division exists which is higher and the Open Div. I is the second division.

== National Amateur Athletic Championships ==
NYAC was involved with forming the National Association of Amateur Athletes of America and the Amateur Athletic Union and their related National Amateur Athletic Championships during the 1800s.

NYAC has held the National Amateur Athletic Championship and National Convention several times.

== Controversies over admissions ==
The New York Athletic Club was, for most of its history, a men's club with the purpose to "promote manly sports". New York City passed a law in 1984 requiring "the admission of women to large, private clubs that play an important role in business and professional life". The NYAC, with 10,000 members, was one of four clubs that the city sanctioned for disobeying the law. The NYAC challenged the law, arguing it was a violation of the First Amendment to the U.S. Constitution guaranteeing the right to freedom of association. The case made its way to the United States Supreme Court where in June 1988, the court held that the clubs who had brought the suit were too dissimilar for the court to decide the case and remanded the case back to the federal district court. This has sometimes been incorrectly reported as upholding the ban. Facing the high cost of restarting the case on its own, the NYAC changed its by-laws and voluntarily admitted some female members in 1989.

There were also claims, over the years, that the club discriminated against blacks and Jews. In 1936, Eddie O'Sullivan invited Olympic track athlete Marty Glickman, who was Jewish, to work out together at the NYAC. When Glickman walked into the lobby, Athletic Director Paul Pilgrim turned the Olympian away. Glickman believed he was turned away because he was Jewish. In the mid-1950s, New York City Councilman Earl D. Brown, a Manhattan Democrat, refused to attend an outing at an NYAC facility to protest the fact that the club: "discriminates against Negroes and Jews on its track team". The Race Relations Reporter reported that a spokesman for the NYAC, Alfred Foster, "admitted that the club has no Jewish or Negro athletes on its teams". However, it also reported that the club secretary stated there were some Jewish members of the NYAC.

In February 1962, New York City Mayor Robert F. Wagner, Jr. quit the NYAC due to allegations that it barred blacks and Jews. Woody Allen had a joke about a Jewish couple that was dressed as a moose and was shot and stuffed and mounted at the NYAC, with his punch line being "And the joke is on them, because it is restricted."

In May 1964, the club was picketed by demonstrators from the Congress for Racial Equality who shouted slogans calling for integration of Negroes and Jews. In the late 1960s, members of The Olympic Project for Human Rights organized black athletes to boycott events held at the NYAC on the grounds that the club excluded Blacks and Jews from membership. Olympian Byron Dyce and most black athletes boycotted the NYAC Games at Madison Square Garden in February 1968 to protest what it alleged were the club's discriminatory membership policies. A 500-600-person crowd protested outside the Games, with picketers charging at police, who swung their nightsticks at the picketers in reaction, with each at times knocking the others to the ground. At the same time, fifty alumni of the University of Notre Dame encouraged their fellow alumni to resign from the club unless it explained its exclusion of non-Whites and Jews. In June 1970, columnist Nat Hentoff criticized Ted Sorensen, who was running in the primary election for the Democratic nomination for U.S. Senator from New York, because Sorensen had lived for a time at the NYAC, writing: "what kind of man would choose to live in one of this city's redoubts of bigotry?"

In 1980, Wrestler Ken Mallory became the first African-American to represent the New York Athletic Club.

In March 1981, prior to a press conference at the NYAC, Muhammad Ali picked up the microphone to test it out and said: "Ladies and Gentlemen, the Jews and niggers and all the other members of the NAACP welcome you to the NYAC." In 1989, Olympic gold medal winner Antonio McKay became the first Black track and field athlete to compete for the NYAC. In January 1998, Curtis A. Harris would become the first black person elected to serve on the NYAC's 19-member board of directors.

== See also ==
- Downtown Athletic Club, defunct rival NYC club that was well known for awarding the Heisman Trophy
- List of American gentlemen's clubs
- Atlanta Athletic Club
- Detroit Athletic Club
- Olympic Club
- Los Angeles Athletic Club
