= William Buckingham Curtis =

American journalist

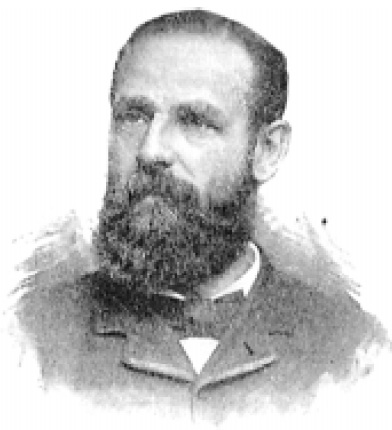
Bill Curtis (circa 1870)

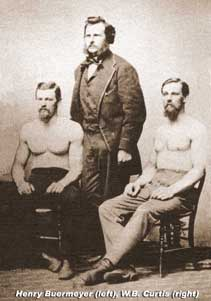
Harry Buermeyer (left) and Bill Curtis (right), c. 1870

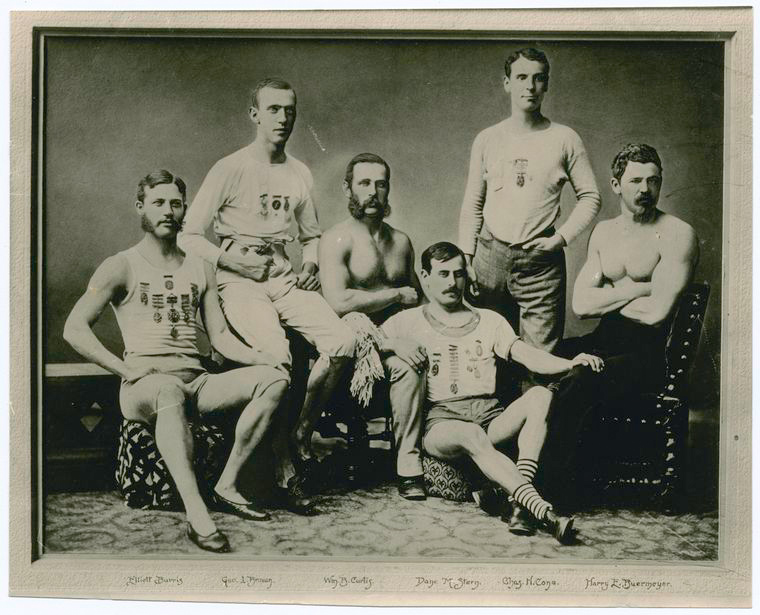
N.Y.A.C. Track Team, Bill Curtis (middle)

William Buckingham "Father Bill" Curtis (January 17, 1837 – June 30, 1900) was one of the most important proponents of organized athletics in the late 1800s in America. Curtis had a remarkable career as a competitor, official, sports editor, organizer, and administrator. He was known as "Father Bill" in the athletic world. The death of Curtis at the age of 63 while climbing Mount Washington brought forth an outpouring of testimonials from the sports world and recognition as a "father of American amateur athletics".

== Early life ==
Curtis was born in Vermont and was a sickly child, having contracted tuberculosis at about 10 years old. In 1850, his family moved to Chicago, and he soon enrolled in Wabash College where he quickly became a leader in many sports. After a couple of years, he changed enrollment to Bell's Commercial College but continued to focus on athletics. When the Civil War started, Curtis joined the Illinois Volunteers and served until the war was over.

== Career ==
Curtis actively competed from the age of 17 to 43 and included championships in gymnastics, rowing, weightlifting, and sprinting. In 1853, in his first public competition, he won nine events in the games of the Chicago Caledonian Club at the age of 17. In 1860, Curtis and his friend John C. Babcock managed Hubert Ottignon's Metropolitan Gymnasium in Chicago. From 1853 to 1872, Curtis did not lose a race in the 100-yard dash until he eventually lost to Harry Buermeyer. Curtis was also a three-time national champion in the hammer throw. Curtis and Buermeyer were considered the strongest men of their time. Curtis successfully lifted over 3,600 pounds (1,600 kg) in a "back" lift.

Curtis helped create several amateur clubs around the country. He founded the New York Athletic Club (N.Y.A.C.) with Buermeyer and Babcock in 1868, and he was the first president of the club. In 1872, he opened the Chicago Athletic Club. Around 1880, Curtis founded the Fresh Air Club to encourage members in New York City to have outdoor exercise in rural areas. Curtis helped found the Amateur Athletic Union in 1888, which eventually became the U.S. Olympic Committee. After retiring from athletics, Curtis became the managing editor of New York City's sports newspaper, the Spirit of the Times.

He died on June 30, 1900, during an ice storm on Mount Washington in New Hampshire. He is buried in Woodlawn Cemetery in the Bronx, New York City.

== Legacy ==
His referee services were in high demand by the Intercollegiate Athletic Association. Throughout his life Curtis strove to purify sports of fraud and corruption.

W. B. Curtis was a devotee of speed skating. In the Spirit of The Times, he covered developments in local and international speed-skating and compiled lists of skating records. He was selected as first president of the National Amateur Skating Association in 1884. Curtis was also an enthusiastic recreational skater and led skating tours on lakes and rivers with the Fresh Air Club. He would scout out the route by skating it himself beforehand and write reports in The Spirit of the Times, under the name "The Pathfinder".

Curtis was also a regular contributor to the outdoor sports magazine, Outing.

He was inducted into the USA Track & Field Hall of Fame in 1979.
