= Greg Anthony =

American basketball player (born 1967)

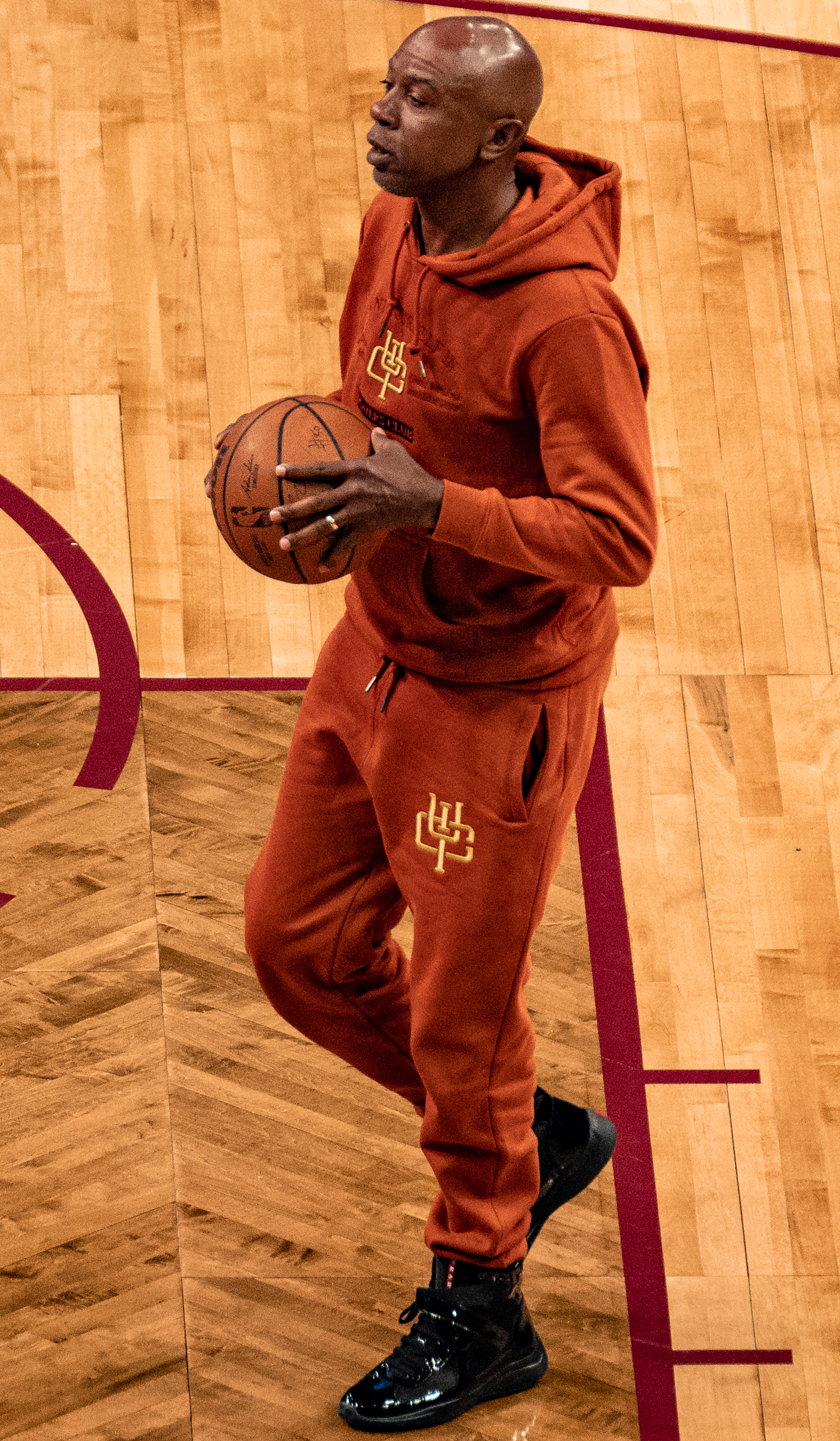
- Anthony at Rocket Mortgage FieldHouse in 2022

Personal information
- Born: November 15, 1967 (age 58) Las Vegas, Nevada, U.S.
- Listed height: 6 ft 1 in (1.85 m)
- Listed weight: 180 lb (82 kg)

Career information
- High school: Rancho (North Las Vegas, Nevada)
- College: Portland (1986–1987); UNLV (1988–1991)
- NBA draft: 1991: 1st round, 12th overall pick
- Drafted by: New York Knicks
- Playing career: 1991–2002
- Position: Point guard
- Number: 2, 50

Career history
- 1991–1995: New York Knicks
- 1995–1997: Vancouver Grizzlies
- 1997–1998: Seattle SuperSonics
- 1999–2001: Portland Trail Blazers
- 2001–2002: Chicago Bulls
- 2002: Milwaukee Bucks

Career highlights
- NCAA champion (1990); 2× Second-team All-Big West (1989, 1990); No. 50 retired by UNLV Runnin' Rebels

Career NBA statistics
- Points: 5,497 (7.3 ppg)
- Assists: 2,997 (4.0 apg)
- Steals: 887 (1.2 spg)
- Stats at NBA.com
- Stats at Basketball Reference

Gregory Carlton Anthony (born November 15, 1967) is an American former professional basketball player who is a television analyst for NBA TV and Turner Sports. He played 11 seasons in the National Basketball Association (NBA). Anthony also contributes to Yahoo! Sports as a college basketball analyst and serves as a co-host/analyst on SiriusXM NBA Radio. His son, Cole Anthony, last played for the Milwaukee Bucks.

== Early life ==
Born and raised in Las Vegas, Nevada, Anthony aspired to enter politics. He wanted to become Nevada's first black Senator. A graduate of Rancho High School in Las Vegas, Nevada, Anthony played his freshman year of college basketball for the University of Portland where he was the WCC Freshman of the Year before transferring to the University of Nevada, Las Vegas. In his junior season with UNLV, the Runnin' Rebels won the 1990 NCAA Championship game over Duke with Anthony starting at point guard, as UNLV blew out the Blue Devils and Christian Laettner by 30 points. He played almost the entire season with a broken jaw. He was a three-time All Big West performer and 3rd Team All America his senior season. This talented team was coached by Jerry Tarkanian and also included future NBA players Stacey Augmon and Larry Johnson. In March 2011, HBO premiered a documentary entitled Runnin' Rebels of UNLV.

During summer breaks, Anthony worked at the World Economic Summit and on Capitol Hill as an intern for Rep. Barbara Vucanovich. He also started a T-shirt and silkscreening business, Two-Hype, while attending UNLV. His entrepreneurial endeavor was the reason why he relinquished his athletic scholarship. Anthony made enough money selling T-shirts that he was able to pay for his own tuition.

== NBA career ==
=== New York Knicks (1991–1995) ===
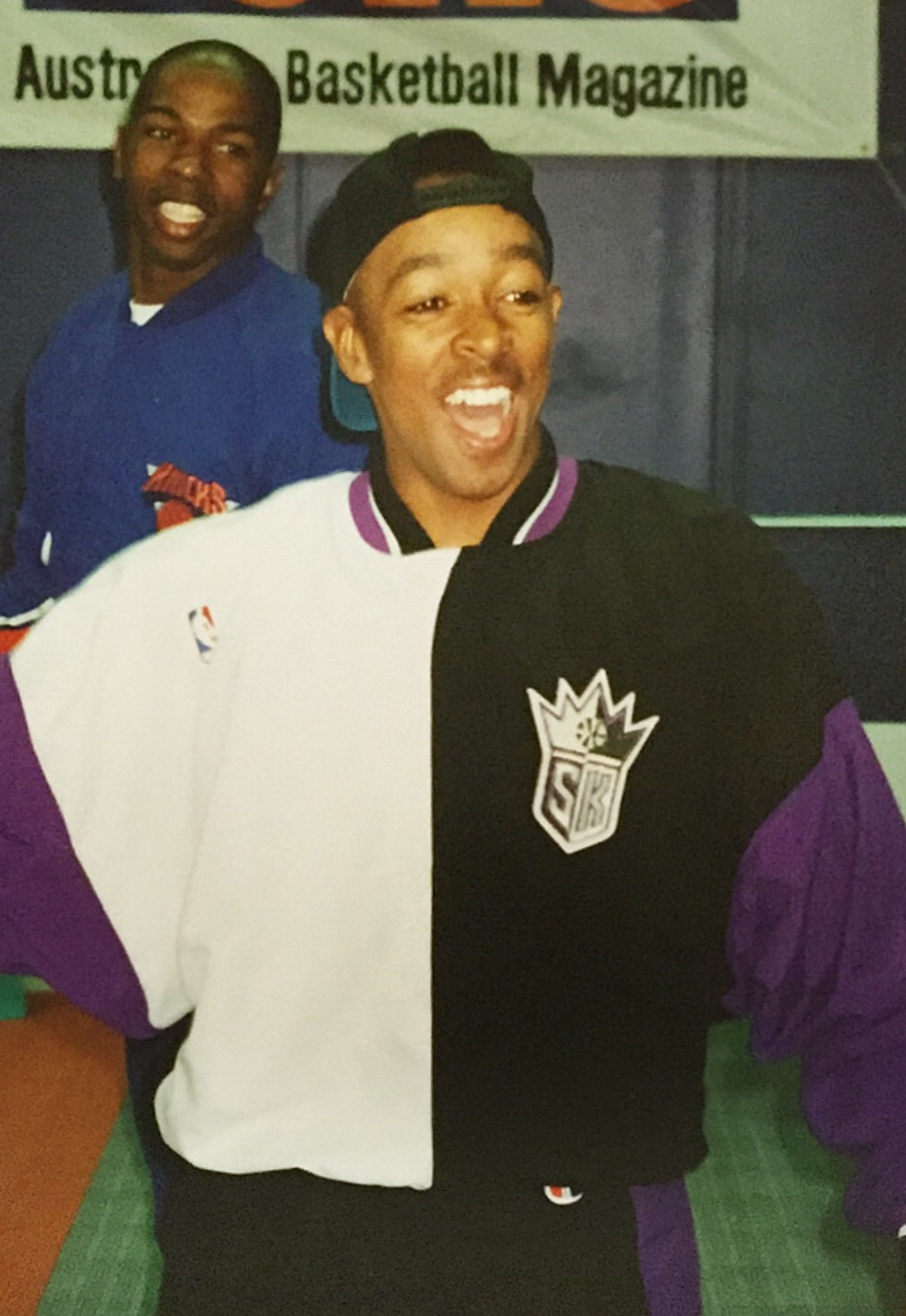
Anthony with Spud Webb at an Australian basketball exhibition in 1994

Anthony was drafted by the New York Knicks with the 12th pick in the first round of the 1991 NBA draft, with the reputation of being a poor outside shooter but an excellent defender. He served as a point guard and defensive specialist, and typified the hard-nosed defensive reputation of Pat Riley's Knicks. On May 24, 1994, Anthony scored 16 points off the bench during a 100-89 Eastern Conference Finals Game 1 win over the Indiana Pacers. The Knicks would ultimately beat the Pacers to advance to the 1994 NBA Finals, but lose to the Houston Rockets in a hard-fought seven-game series.

=== Vancouver Grizzlies (1995–1997) ===
In 1995, Anthony was drafted in the 1995 NBA expansion draft as the 1st pick (2nd overall) by the Vancouver Grizzlies, where he would be the full-time starter at point guard for two seasons. On January 5, 1996, Anthony scored a career-high 32 points during a 103–102 overtime win against the 76ers.

=== Seattle SuperSonics (1997–1998) ===
In August 1997, Anthony was released by the Grizzlies. In October 1997, he signed as a free agent with the Seattle SuperSonics. Anthony played one season in Seattle, appearing in 80 games in the 1997–98 season, averaging 5.2 points per game. The Sonics finished the season with a 61–21 record but lost in the Western conference semifinals to the Los Angeles Lakers.

=== Portland Trail Blazers (1999–2001) ===
In January 1999, Anthony was released by the Sonics and signed a contract with the Portland Trail Blazers. He would spend three seasons playing in Portland.

=== Chicago Bulls (2001–2002) ===
As part of a trade in July 2001, Anthony was sent to the Chicago Bulls in exchange for a 2002 second round pick (Jason Jennings was later selected). Anthony would play 36 games for the Bulls in the 2001–02 season.

=== Milwaukee Bucks (2002) ===
Anthony was released by the Bulls and signed a contract with the Milwaukee Bucks, his final stop in the NBA. The Bucks would miss the playoffs and Anthony played his final NBA game on April 17, 2002, recording two points, six rebounds, and six assists in a loss to the Detroit Pistons.

== Broadcasting career ==
Upon retirement, Anthony joined ESPN as an analyst for both NBA coverage on ESPN and ABC.

On December 13, 2008, Anthony made his debut as a college basketball analyst for CBS Sports, replacing Clark Kellogg, who was promoted to lead commentator.

Anthony agreed to be a color commentator for the YES Network covering the Brooklyn Nets for the 2012–2013 season alongside Ian Eagle, Mike Fratello, and Jim Spanarkel.

In 2014, Anthony and Kellogg swapped their respective roles at CBS Sports, with Anthony moving to the broadcast booth as a lead commentator and Kellogg returning to his previous role as a studio analyst.

Anthony has been featured as a commentator in the NBA 2K series of video games since NBA 2K16.

== Off court ==
=== Personal life ===
Anthony is married to Chere Lucas Anthony, a dermatologist, with whom he has one daughter and one son. He has two other children from a previous marriage to Crystal McCrary, Cole and Ella Anthony. Cole was the starting point guard for the University of North Carolina Tar Heels and was drafted by Orlando Magic in the NBA 2020 draft with the 15th pick in the first round.

=== Politics ===
Anthony has been politically active with the Republican Party since his days at UNLV, where he graduated with a degree in political science and served as the vice chairman of Nevada's Young Republicans.

In 2012, Anthony publicly endorsed Republican presidential candidate Mitt Romney, appearing in a Romney ad in Nevada.

=== Arrest ===
On January 16, 2015, Anthony was arrested in Washington, D.C., and charged with soliciting a prostitute. Following his arrest, Anthony was indefinitely suspended by CBS and Turner Sports. On February 11, Anthony reached a deferred prosecution agreement in which the charge would be dropped provided he completed 32 hours of community service and stayed out of trouble for four months.

In March 2016, Anthony was dropped by CBS, but returned to Turner as a studio analyst for NBA TV, and as a fill-in analyst for the NBA on TNT during the regular season and the playoffs.

== NBA career statistics ==
A list of Anthony's career statistics:

Legend
GP	Games played	GS	Games started	MPG	Minutes per game
FG%	Field goal percentage	3P%	3-point field goal percentage	FT%	Free throw percentage
RPG	Rebounds per game	APG	Assists per game	SPG	Steals per game
BPG	Blocks per game	PPG	Points per game	**Bold**	Career high
*	Led the league

=== Regular season ===
Year	Team	GP	GS	MPG	FG%	3P%	FT%	RPG	APG	SPG	BPG	PPG
1991–92	New York	**82**	1	18.4	.370	.145	.741	1.7	3.8	0.7	.1	5.5
1992–93	New York	70	35	24.3	.415	.133	.673	2.4	5.7	1.6	**.2**	6.6
1993–94	New York	80	36	24.9	.394	.300	.774	2.4	4.6	1.4	**.2**	7.9
1994–95	New York	61	2	15.5	**.437**	.361	**.789**	1.0	2.6	0.8	.1	6.1
1995–96	Vancouver	69	**68**	**30.4**	.415	.332	.771	2.5	**6.9**	1.7	**.2**	**14.0**
1996–97	Vancouver	65	44	28.7	.393	.370	.730	**2.8**	6.3	**2.0**	.1	9.5
1997–98	Seattle	80	0	12.8	.430	**.415**	.663	1.4	2.6	0.8	.0	5.2
1998–99	Portland	50*	0	16.1	.414	.392	.697	1.3	2.0	1.3	.1	6.4
1999–00	Portland	**82**	3	18.9	.406	.378	.772	1.6	2.5	0.7	.1	6.3
2000–01	Portland	58	0	14.8	.383	.409	.657	1.1	1.4	0.7	.1	4.9
2001–02	Chicago	36	35	26.7	.394	.322	.671	2.4	5.6	1.4	.1	8.4
2001–02	Milwaukee	24	3	23.0	.372	.260	.619	1.8	3.3	1.2	.0	7.2
Career		757	227	20.9	.403	.349	.733	1.9	4.0	1.2	.1	7.3

=== Playoffs ===
Year	Team	GP	GS	MPG	FG%	3P%	FT%	RPG	APG	SPG	BPG	PPG
1992	New York	12	0	**17.8**	**.413**	**.417**	.606	1.4	3.4	**1.3**	.1	**5.3**
1993	New York	15	0	16.0	.400	.214	.571	**2.0**	**3.5**	0.9	.1	3.9
1994	New York	**25**	**3**	17.4	.352	.295	.583	1.1	2.4	0.8	**.3**	4.9
1995	New York	11	0	12.3	.395	.304	**.909**	0.9	1.4	0.2	.2	4.3
1998	Seattle	9	0	13.1	.300	.263	.375	1.1	1.1	0.6	.1	3.6
1999	Portland	13	0	17.3	.327	.258	.676	1.1	2.5	1.0	.1	5.2
2000	Portland	15	0	14.2	.365	.323	.750	1.1	1.7	0.9	**.3**	4.0
2001	Portland	2	0	8.5	.333	.333	.000	0.0	0.0	0.5	.0	2.5
Career		102	3	15.7	.362	.294	.643	1.2	2.3	0.8	.2	4.5

== See also ==
- List of NCAA Division I men's basketball career assists leaders
- List of NCAA Division I men's basketball career steals leaders
- Black conservatism in the United States
