= Amateur Athletic Union =

American nonprofit athletic organization

- Abbreviation: AAU
- Formation: January 21, 1888; 138 years ago
- Founder: James Edward Sullivan
- Founded at: New York Athletic Club
- Type: Amateur Sports Organization
- Headquarters: Lake Buena Vista, Florida, U.S.
- Members: 900,000 athletes and coaches nationwide
- President/CEO: J.B. Mirza
- Website: aausports.org

The Amateur Athletic Union (AAU) is an amateur sports organization based in the United States. A multi-sport organization, the AAU is dedicated exclusively to the promotion and development of amateur sports and physical fitness programs. It has more than 900,000 members nationwide, including more than 100,000 volunteers. The philosophy of the AAU is "Sports for All, Forever."

The AAU was founded on January 21, 1888, by James E. Sullivan and William Buckingham Curtis with the goal of creating common standards in amateur sport. Since then, most national championships for youth athletes in the United States have taken place under AAU leadership. From its founding as a publicly supported organization, the AAU has represented U.S. sports within the various international sports federations. In the late 1800s to the early 1900s, Spalding Athletic Library of the Spalding Company published the Official Rules of the AAU.

The AAU formerly worked closely with what is now today the United States Olympic & Paralympic Committee to prepare U.S. athletes for both the Summer and Winter Olympic Games, helping in the qualification of athletes to form the national team. As part of this, the AAU Junior Olympic Games were introduced in 1949, with athletes aged 8 to 16 years, or older in certain sports, being able to participate. Many future World and Olympic champions have appeared in these events, which are still held every year.

In the 1970s, the AAU received growing criticism. Many claimed that its regulatory framework was outdated. Women were banned from participating in certain competitions and some runners were locked out. The sporting goods industry also criticized the AAU for stifling innovation by forcing outdated or overreaching standards on their goods and game equipment. During this time, the Olympic Sports Act of 1978 organized the then United States Olympic Committee and saw the re-establishment of independent associations for the Olympic sports, referred to as national governing bodies. The rise of professionalism in all sports in the latter half of the 20th century also hurt the AAU's viability. As a result, the AAU lost its influence and importance in international sports, and focused on the support and promotion of predominantly youthful athletes, as well as on the organization of national sports events.

== History ==
Prior to the AAU, the National Association of Amateur Athletes of America (NAAA) existed from 1879 to 1888. The AAU was co-founded in 1888 by William Buckingham Curtis to establish standards and uniformity in amateur sports. During its early years the AAU represented the U.S. in the international sports federations and prepared U.S. athletes for the Olympic Games.

The AAU conducted its first event, championships for boxing, fencing, and wrestling, on April 6, 1888, at New York City's Metropolitan Opera House.

The open USA Outdoor Track and Field Championships were organized by the AAU between 1888 and 1978. Following the Women's World Games in 1922, the AAU sponsored the First American Track & Field championships for women in September 1923. (Note: In the United Kingdom, the Women's Amateur Athletic Association (WAAA) was founded in 1922 and several national women's track meets were held that year, followed by the first official British women's championships in track and field in August 1923. University-level competition began in 1921 and the Inter-Varsity Athletics Board (IVAB) in England held its first inter-varsity track and field competition for women in 1922; the Women's Inter-Varsity Athletics Board (WIVAB) was formed in 1923.)

In 1897, the AAU held its first national men's basketball championship. The winner was the 23rd Street YMCA from New York City. The first AAU women's basketball tournament was held in April 1926 at the Los Angeles Athletics Club. The Pasadena Athletic & Country Club Flying Rings were crowned the champions.

In 1913, the AAU and the International Olympic Committee removed American athlete Jim Thorpe's two Olympic medals, for decathlon and pentathlon, earned at the 1912 Summer Olympics held in Stockholm, Sweden, because Thorpe had previously taken expense money from a semi-professional baseball team, as he played the sport part-time. The AAU retroactively revoked Thorpe's amateur status, and the IOC delisted Thorpe as the winner of those events.

After decades of advocacy to restore his medals, Thorpe was posthumously relisted in 1983 as the "co-champion" of those events after the IOC acknowledged that the protest against his eligibility by Avery Brundage did not happen within the 30 days required by the rules at the time. The other athletes involved had always considered Thorpe to be the sole winner, and the community continued to push for recognition of his victories. Finally, he was restored as the sole champion in 2022.

The AAU logo is prominently displayed on the Jim Thorpe Monument in Jim Thorpe, Pennsylvania, a town renamed after Thorpe, who had no connection with it in his lifetime.

In 1939, the Mr. America contest, a bodybuilding competition, was started by the AAU. It was first held on July 4, 1939, and the winner was named "America's Best Built Man". In 1940 this was changed to what is now known as the Mr. America contest. Rights to the Mr. America name have been sold several times after the AAU discontinued holding the contest in 1999.

In the 1960s and 1970s, the NCAA engaged in a bitter power struggle with the AAU.

After the Amateur Sports Act of 1978 broke up the AAU's responsibility as the national Olympic sports governing body, the AAU focused on providing sports programs for all participants of all ages beginning at the local and regional levels.

The AAU is divided into 55 distinct district associations, which annually sanction 45 sports programs, 250 national championships, and over 30,000 age division events. The AAU events have over 900,000 participants and over 100,000 volunteers.

=== Women barred ===
In early 1914, the Amateur Athletic Union barred women athletes from competing in events that it sponsored. Later in 1914 they changed their rules and allowed women to compete in a limited number of swimming events. Just two years later in 1916, the AAU was considering discontinuing their experiment in allowing women at swimming events.

In 1922, the Metropolitan AAU in New York City approved a larger program of sanctioned events for women but still barred them from running events over one-half mile because they were considered too strenuous. The reason given for barring women was that if a woman was allowed to run more than a half-mile they would put their reproductive health at risk. But by 1923 the AAU allowed women to compete in most sports, including basketball. The AAU held women's basketball tournaments from 1926 through 1970.

In 1961, the Amateur Athletic Union still prohibited women from competing in road running events and even if organizers broke the rule and allowed a woman to participate, her results would not be counted in the official race results.

In 1970, the first New York City Marathon ignored the AAU rules and allowed women in the event even if it meant that their scores would not be official. For the second New York City Marathon in 1971 the AAU allowed women to participate if they started the race 10 minutes before, or 10 minutes after the men, or if they ran an equivalent course. In 1972, American women Nina Kuscsik, Pat Barrett, Lynn Blackstone, Liz Franceschini, Cathy Miller, and Jane Muhrke protested the rule of the AAU, which as implemented by the New York City Marathon that year meant that women had to start running ten minutes before the men. The women protested by sitting down and waiting ten minutes while holding signs protesting the rule, before starting to run when the men started; they became known as the NYC Six due to their protest. Ten minutes were added to their times. The ten minute difference requirement was dropped later in 1972.

By 1974, American women in general were becoming more vocal about their restrictions.

=== Ice hockey breaks away ===
The United States failed to send a ice hockey team to the 1928 Winter Olympics due to a dispute between the United States Amateur Hockey Association and the American Olympic Committee. In 1930, the USAHA was dissolved and the AAU took control of ice hockey in the United States.

After the Canadian Amateur Hockey Association (CAHA) split ways with the Amateur Athletic Union of Canada in 1937, the AAU terminated its working agreement with the CAHA. The AAU then issued an ultimatum to the Eastern Amateur Hockey League (EAHL) in August 1937. EAHL president Tommy Lockhart chose to break away from the AAU and reached an agreement with the CAHA, and then founded the Amateur Hockey Association of the United States (AHAUS) to govern ice hockey. The AHAUS and the CAHA joined to form the International Ice Hockey Association, which merged into the Ligue Internationale de Hockey sur Glace to become the International Ice Hockey Federation (IIHF) in 1947. With the merger, the IIHF chose to recognize the AHAUS as the governing body of hockey in the United States, instead of the AAU.

Despite the decision by the IIHF, the AAU sent its own team to compete in ice hockey at the 1948 Winter Olympics. The AAU was supported by the United States Olympic Committee led by Avery Brundage, who threatened to boycott the Olympics if an AHAUS team was recognized instead of an AAU team as he considered the AHAUS team to be "tainted with professionalism". The status of the U.S. ice hockey team at the 1948 Winter Olympics was not resolved until the night before the Olympics began, after bitter negotiations. The International Olympic Committee allowed the AHAUS team to participate, but they were ineligible to win an Olympic medal. The dispute was resolved in 1950 with the creation of an Olympic hockey committee composed of an equal number of members from the AAU and AHAUS.

=== Break-up ===
The Amateur Sports Act of 1978 was precipitated by concerns of the inefficiency of the AAU to manage the multitude of sports at the Olympic level. USA Gymnastics was formed initially as a feeder program in 1963 as a response to poor performance by the American athletes in the Olympics and at World Championships. The USWF was formed in 1968 as an effort to take over amateur wrestling as an independent governing body. Their position was supported when FILA, then wrestling's world governing body, refused to accept membership of "umbrella" sports organizations like the AAU. The International Track Association was formed immediately after the 1972 Olympics. Prior to the formation of the ITA, track and field athletes were amateur athletes, as required by the Olympic creed of the day. The only income they received from their sport was sporadic, inadequate and often "under the table." As a result, many American athletes' careers were frequently cut short shortly after their subsidized participation at the collegiate level ended, even as Eastern Bloc and other international athletes frequently had their careers extended under the facade of being a part of national military or police service (usually being more honorary than productive work) which extended their amateurism. Pressure from the athletes had been mounting for years to find an answer. Track and Field News discussed the subject with its cover article "Take the Money and Run" in November 1971.

== Headquarters ==
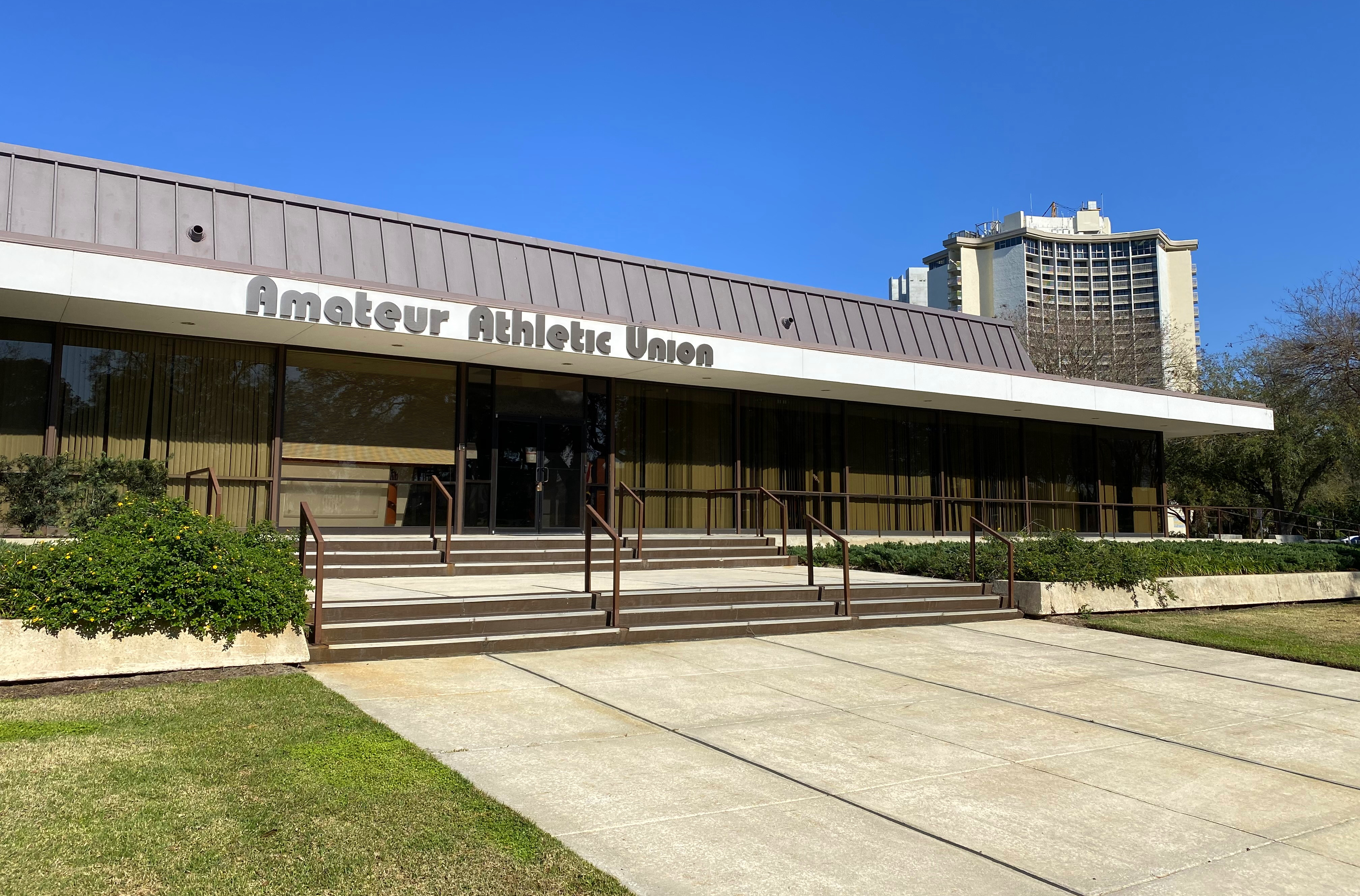
The building opened as the Walt Disney World Preview Center in 1970 and currently houses the Amateur Athletic Union.

AAU got its start in New York City, but in 1957 the search began for a permanent national office site rather than renting office space in New York. In 1970, the AAU officially moved its national headquarters to Indianapolis, serving as the catalyst to the city being billed as the "Amateur Sports Capital" of the United States.

In 1994, the AAU joined forces with the Walt Disney World Resort, signing a 30-year agreement. As part of that agreement, many of AAU's national championships in are played at the ESPN Wide World of Sports Complex in Lake Buena Vista, Florida. In 1996, the AAU relocated its national headquarters to Walt Disney World in Lake Buena Vista, Florida. More than 40 AAU national events are conducted at the complex. The AAU headquarters is located within the former Walt Disney World Preview Center.

== Programs ==
Programs offered by the AAU include: AAU Sports Program, AAU Junior Olympic Games, AAU James E. Sullivan Memorial Award and the AAU Complete Athlete Program.

The AAU has 33 national committees to organize its activities in particular sports.

AAU operates under a 501(c)(3) tax-exempt status granted in 1996.

=== Sports offered ===
The Amateur Athletic Union offers participants sport programming in individual and team sports in their local community that they can join and compete with other athletes their own age. There are teams in most sports ranging from 9U to 18U, allowing youth athletes to play for championships in sports against other athletes similar in age and athletic development.

The AAU offers sport programming for individuals and teams in the following sports:

- AAU Junior Olympic Games
- Archery
- Aquatics
  - Swimming
  - Diving
- Badminton
- Baseball
  - Softball
- Basketball
- Baton twirling
- Cheerleading
- Chess
- Cornhole
- Dance
- Esports
- Fencing
- American football
  - Flag football
- Golf
- Gymnastics
  - Acrobatic gymnastics
  - Rhythmic gymnastics
  - Trampoline
  - Tumbling
- Hockey
  - Field hockey
  - Ice hockey
  - Inline hockey
- Jump rope
- Lacrosse
- Martial arts
  - Judo
  - Karate
  - Kung fu
  - Taekwondo
- Paddleboarding
- Pickleball
- Association football
  - Futsal
- Sport stacking
- Strength sports
  - Powerlifting
  - Weightlifting
- Surfing
- Table tennis
- Target shooting
- Track and field
- Volleyball
  - Beach volleyball
- Wrestling

=== AAU Junior Olympic Games ===
The AAU Junior Olympic Games is the largest multi-sport event for youth in the United States. It has become the showcase event of the AAU Sports Program.

The Games originated from 'telegraphic' state track and field competitions. National Champions were determined through telephone and/or mail entries instead of head-to-head competition. In 1949, the AAU conducted its first 'live' national meet in Cleveland, Ohio—giving birth to the AAU Youth Sports Program.

As the popularity of the AAU Youth Sports Program increased, the AAU leaders decided to conduct two national championships simultaneously. The idea came to fruition when Vice President Hubert H. Humphrey proclaimed the first AAU Junior Olympic Games open on August 21, 1967, in downtown Washington, D.C., at the Departmental Auditorium on Constitution Avenue. Five hundred twenty-three athletes competed in the inaugural AAU Junior Olympic Games in Washington, D.C. in 1967. National champions were determined in swimming and track and field. Eighteen AAU records in swimming and three in track and field were established.

Since its beginning in Washington, D.C. in 1967, the AAU Junior Olympic Games have been conducted in 19 states and 31 cities across the United States. The Games popularity has exploded from the original 523 athletes to more than 18,000 participants representing all 50 states and several United States territories.

The AAU Junior Olympic Games has been honored with Champions of Economic Impact in Sports Tourism Awards from Sports Destination Management in 2017, 2018, 2019, 2021, 2022 and 2023.

=== AAU Junior National Volleyball Championships ===
The AAU Junior National Volleyball Championships is one of AAU's premier and award-winning national events. The inaugural AAU Junior National Volleyball Championships took place on June 25, 1974, in Catonsville, Maryland. Nineteen teams participated, representing 10 states.

In June 1997, the AAU Junior National Volleyball Championships was held at Disney's Wide World of Sports Complex (now ESPN Wide World of Sports) for the first time. It was the first volleyball event to be played in the Fieldhouse at the complex, with a total of 127 teams attending.

In 2012, the AAU Girls' Junior National Volleyball Championships was named the largest volleyball tournament in the world by Guinness World Records. The event was held at ESPN's Wide World of Sports and the Orange County Convention Center in Orlando, Florida.

The 50th AAU Junior National Volleyball Championships in 2023 was the largest event to date with 5,194 teams (966 boys and 4228 girls) competing. It's the largest sporting event ever held at the Orange County Convention Center.

Over the years, this premier AAU event has been recognized as a seven-time winner of the Champions of Economic Impact in Sports Tourism Award by Sports Destination Management, Best Single Amateur Sporting Event by Sports Travel Awards, and Best Sporting Event by Connect Sports.

=== AAU Cares ===
The AAU Cares program was established in 2016 as the AAU's way of giving back to the community. The first event was held in conjunction with the 86th AAU James E. Sullivan Award. With the assistance of New York State Senator Kevin Parker, bicycles were assembled by the AAU Board of Directors and presented to under-served New York City area youth. Other AAU Cares events were held in conjunction with the AAU Girls' Junior National Volleyball Championships in 2016 and 2017 respectively where the AAU teamed up with Feeding Children Everywhere to pack a total of 120,000 meals in total for hungry children. Currently in conjunction with the AAU Junior National Volleyball Championships are Dig Pink® initiatives benefitting the Side-Out Foundation.

=== AAU Urban Initiative ===
The AAU Urban Initiative was created in 2015 to provide a holistic approach to athletics. It provides participation opportunities to areas that were historically under served. The initiative partners the AAU with local government, law enforcement, faith-based groups, business communities, educational institutions and other groups who work to bring communities together through sports in service to America's youth. Through mentoring, the program teaches life skills, character development, and harmony. On September 16–17, 2023, the AAU Urban Initiative program held an inaugural 3x3 AAU Basketball Tournament at Times Square in New York City.

=== AAU College Hockey ===
The AAU College Hockey was established in March 2023, through the collaboration of the Collegiate Hockey Federation and Amateur Athletic Union. Beginning with the 2023–2024 season, AAU College Hockey includes Men's Division 1, Division 2, and Division 3, and a Women's Division, aiming to offer the best collegiate hockey experience while prioritizing the needs of its member conferences, programs, student-athletes, and staff.

AAU Hockey sponsors national tournaments for minor hockey levels. A North American Championship for Squirt/Atom and PeeWee levels as well as Midget and Bantam levels is set for debut in 2015 in cooperation with the Canadian Independent Hockey Federation (CIHF).

== AAU James E. Sullivan Award ==
The AAU James E. Sullivan Award has been presented annually since 1930 to the best collegiate or Olympic-level athlete in the United States – making this award older than the Heisman Trophy (1935).

The AAU Sullivan Award is a salute to founder and past president of the Amateur Athletic Union, and a pioneer in amateur sports, James E. Sullivan. Based on the qualities of leadership, character, and sportsmanship, the AAU Sullivan Award goes beyond athletic accomplishments and honors those who have shown strong moral character as well.

Golfer Bobby Jones was the first recipient of the AAU Sullivan Award in 1930, beating out other finalists Barney Berling (athletics), Clarence De Mar (athletics), Tommy Hitchcock (polo), Helen Madison (swimming), Helen Wills Moody (tennis), Harlon Rothert (all-around), Ray Rudy (swimming), George Simpson (athletics) and Stella Walsh (athletics) to take home the honor.

In 1944, Ann Curtis, an 18-year-old swimmer from San Francisco, became the first woman to receive the AAU Sullivan Award. Curtis had captured eight AAU titles during the year.

In 2024, the 94th AAU James E. Sullivan Award was presented to college basketball star Caitlin Clark, who became the first ever two-time winner of the award. Other finalists included David Taylor (wrestler), Emery Lehman (speedskating), Frederick Richard (gymnastics), Madisen Skinner (volleyball) and Noah Jaffe (para swimming) .

== Masters Track and Field ==
Masters Track and Field officially began in 1968, and in 1971 became a separate group within the AAU organization. Masters Track and Field is now part of USA Track & Field (USATF).

== Documentary films ==
The live action short film The Winning Strain was filmed at the 1966 AAU Track and Field championships in New York City and was nominated for an Oscar in 1967.

1999 HBO documentary Dare to Compete: The Struggle of Women in Sports won the Peabody Award.

In September 2008, More than a Game premiered at the Toronto International Film Festival. LeBron James founded SpringHill Entertainment in 2007 to produce the award-winning documentary, which chronicles his high school basketball career.

The 2011 documentary Empty Hand: The Real Karate Kids, written and directed by Kevin Derek, chronicles four young karate competitors compete en route to the annual AAU Karate Championship national tournament.

A 2013 AAU youth basketball documentary Little Ballers, was televised by Nickelodeon in 2015, as the first documentary to be aired on NickSports. The film was directed by Crystal McCrary and featured AAU youth team New Heights, featuring Cole Anthony, who is her son.

In 2016, At All Costs explores how the AAU basketball circuit has professionalized youth basketball across America.

== Criticism ==
=== Management of Olympic sports (to 1978) ===
In the early 1970s, the AAU became the subject of criticism, notably by outspoken track star Steve Prefontaine, over the living conditions for amateur athletes under the AAU, as well as rules that were perceived to be arbitrary.

The AAU ceased to have any governance over Olympic sports in the U.S. when, due to various criticisms, Congress intervened. A three-year commission led to its enactment of the Amateur Sports Act of 1978, establishing the United States Olympic Committee (USOPC) and national governing bodies for each Olympic sport. The AAU continues as a voluntary organization which mainly promotes youth sports.

=== High school basketball ===
In 2015, Kobe Bryant strongly criticized the AAU, describing it as "Horrible, terrible AAU basketball. It's stupid. It doesn't teach our kids how to play the game at all so you wind up having players that are big and they bring it up and they do all this fancy crap and they don't know how to post. They don't know the fundamentals of the game. It's stupid". Bryant, who moved to Italy at age six because his father played basketball there, stated that the AAU has been "treating (amateur basketball players) like cash cows for everyone to profit off of".

Steve Kerr has also spoken out against the AAU, stating that the AAU's structure devalues winning, with many teams playing as much as four times a day and some players changing teams from one morning to the afternoon of the same day. Kerr also states that "The process of growing as a team basketball player—learning how to become part of a whole, how to fit into something bigger than oneself—becomes completely lost within the AAU fabric".

=== Sexual misconduct ===
Sexual misconduct allegations have come to light several times during the 21st century. Former President Robert W. "Bobby" Dodd was accused of abuse in 2011. Then in 2016, the AAU was sued for allowing Rick Butler, a youth volleyball coach accused of sexually abusing his players in the past, to coach an under-18 team in the AAU Girls' Junior National Volleyball Championships.
