= UNLV Runnin' Rebels basketball statistical leaders =

The UNLV Runnin' Rebels basketball statistical leaders are individual statistical leaders of the UNLV Runnin' Rebels basketball program in various categories, including points, assists, blocks, rebounds, and steals. Within those areas, the lists identify single-game, single-season, and career leaders. The Runnin' Rebels represent the University of Nevada, Las Vegas in the NCAA's Mountain West Conference.

UNLV began competing in intercollegiate basketball in 1958. The NCAA did not officially record assists as a stat until the 1983–84 season, and blocks and steals until the 1985–86 season, but UNLV's record books includes players in these stats before these seasons. These lists are updated through the end of the 2021–22 season.

== Scoring ==
Career
Rk	Player	Points	Seasons
1	Eddie Owens	2221	1973–74 1974–75 1975–76 1976–77
2	Sidney Green	2073	1979–80 1980–81 1981–82 1982–83
3	Stacey Augmon	2011	1987–88 1988–89 1989–90 1990–91
4	Freddie Banks	2007	1983–84 1984–85 1985–86 1986–87
5	Silas Stepp	1942	1962–63 1963–64 1964–65 1965–66
6	Wink Adams	1875	2005–06 2006–07 2007–08 2008–09
7	Armon Gilliam	1855	1984–85 1985–86 1986–87
8	Larry Anderson	1818	1979–80 1980–81 1981–82 1982–83
9	Bryce Hamilton	1773	2018–19 2019–20 2020–21 2021–22
10	Dalron Johnson	1728	1999–00 2000–01 2001–02 2002–03

Season
Rk	Player	Points	Season
1	Armon Gilliam	903	1986–87
2	Elburt Miller	894	1966–67
3	Larry Johnson	822	1989–90
4	J.R. Rider	814	1992–93
5	Larry Johnson	795	1990–91
6	Elburt Miller	774	1967–68
7	Freddie Banks	760	1986–87
8	Eddie Owens	725	1975–76
9	Dra Gibbs-Lawhorn	724	2025–26
10	Eddie Owens	699	1976–77

Single game
Rk	Player	Points	Season	Opponent
1	Elburt Miller	55	1966–67	Portland
2	Trevor Diggs	49	2000–01	Wyoming
3	Elburt Miller	45	1966–67	Southern Utah State
4	J.R. Rider	44	1992–93	UNR
5	Bob Florence	43	1972–73	Houston
6	Bob Florence	43	1972–73	St. Mary's College
	Booker Washington	43	1970–71	St. Mary's College
	John Q. Trapp	43	1967–68	UC Irvine
9	Elburt Miller	42	1967–68	Cal State Los Angeles
	Elburt Miller	42	1966–67	Hawaii
	Bryce Hamilton	42	2021–22	Colorado State
	Dra Gibbs-Lawhorn	42	2025–26	Nevada

== Rebounds ==
Career
Rk	Player	Rebounds	Seasons
1	Sidney Green	1276	1979–80 1980–81 1981–82 1982–83
2	Lewis Brown	1019	1973–74 1974–75 1975–76 1976–77
3	Stacey Augmon	1005	1987–88 1988–89 1989–90 1990–91
4	Kaspars Kambala	921	1997–98 1998–99 1999–00 2000–01
5	Silas Stepp	895	1962–63 1963–64 1964–65 1965–66
6	Armon Gilliam	890	1984–85 1985–86 1986–87
7	Dalron Johnson	841	1999–00 2000–01 2001–02 2002–03
8	Larry Johnson	837	1989–90 1990–91
9	Glen Gondrezick	831	1973–74 1974–75 1975–76 1976–77
10	Cheikh Mbacke Diong	708	2017–18 2018–19 2019–20 2020–21

Season
Rk	Player	Rebounds	Season
1	Larry Johnson	457	1989–90
2	Jimmie Baker	424	1972–73
3	Larry Johnson	380	1990–91
4	Mike Moser	369	2011–12
5	Sidney Green	368	1982–83
6	Armon Gilliam	363	1986–87
7	Sidney Green	354	1979–80
8	Glen Gondrezick	347	1976–77
9	Brandon McCoy	341	2017–18
10	Khem Birch	337	2013–14
	Roscoe Smith	337	2013–14

Single game
Rk	Player	Rebounds	Season	Opponent
1	Jimmie Baker	26	1972–73	San Francisco

== Assists ==
NCAA Division I record

Career
Rk	Player	Assists	Seasons
1	Greg Anthony	838	1988–89 1989–90 1990–91
2	Danny Tarkanian	837	1981–82 1982–83 1983–84
3	Mark Dickel	776	1996–97 1997–98 1998–99 1999–00
4	Mark Wade	689	1985–86 1986–87
5	Oscar Bellfield	582	2008–09 2009–10 2010–11 2011–12
6	Dedan Thomas	549	1991–92 1992–93 1993–94
7	Anthony Marshall	514	2009–10 2010–11 2011–12 2012–13
8	Freddie Banks	497	1983–84 1984–85 1985–86 1986–87
9	Robert Smith	445	1974–75 1975–76 1976–77
10	Stacey Augmon	433	1987–88 1988–89 1989–90 1990–91

Season
Rk	Player	Assists	Season
1	Mark Wade	406	1986–87
2	Greg Anthony	310	1990–91
3	Greg Anthony	289	1989–90
	Danny Tarkanian	289	1983–84
5	Danny Tarkanian	286	1982–83
6	Mark Wade	283	1985–86
7	Mark Dickel	280	1999–00
8	Danny Tarkanian	262	1981–82
9	Dedan Thomas	248	1992–93
10	Greg Anthony	239	1988–89

Single game
Rk	Player	Assists	Season	Opponent
1	Mark Wade	21	1986–87	Navy

== Steals ==
Career
Rk	Player	Steals	Seasons
1	Greg Anthony	275	1988–89 1989–90 1990–91
	Stacey Augmon	275	1987–88 1988–89 1989–90 1990–91
3	Wink Adams	213	2005–06 2006–07 2007–08 2008–09
4	Freddie Banks	184	1983–84 1984–85 1985–86 1986–87
	Danny Tarkanian	184	1981–82 1982–83 1983–84
6	Anthony Marshall	182	2009–10 2010–11 2011–12 2012–13
7	Justin Hawkins	170	2009–10 2010–11 2011–12 2012–13
8	Mark Dickel	161	1996–97 1997–98 1998–99 1999–00
9	Marcus Banks	158	2001–02 2002–03
10	Dedan Thomas	151	1991–92 1992–93 1993–94

Season
Rk	Player	Steals	Season
1	Greg Anthony	106	1989–90
2	Marcus Banks	91	2002–03
3	Greg Anthony	85	1988–89
4	Greg Anthony	84	1990–91
5	Mark Wade	83	1986–87
6	Patrick McCaw	81	2015–16
7	Stacey Augmon	78	1990–91
8	René Rougeau	75	2007–08
9	Larry Johnson	74	1990–91
	Danny Tarkanian	74	1983–84

Single game
Rk	Player	Steals	Season	Opponent
1	Wink Adams	8	2005–06	Colorado State
	Marcus Banks	8	2002–03	Colorado State
	Marcus Banks	8	2002–03	IPFW
	Trevor Diggs	8	1999–00	Eastern Kentucky

== Blocks ==
Career
Rk	Player	Blocks	Seasons
1	Dalron Johnson	194	1999–00 2000–01 2001–02 2002–03
2	Khem Birch	192	2012–13 2013–14
3	Joel Anthony	157	2004–05 2005–06 2006–07
4	Elmore Spencer	146	1990–91 1991–92
5	George Ackles	141	1988–89 1990–91
6	Richie Adams	139	1981–82 1982–83 1983–84 1984–85
7	Keon Clark	138	1996–97 1997–98
8	Stacey Augmon	128	1987–88 1988–89 1989–90 1990–91
9	Cheikh Mbacke Diong	126	2017–18 2018–19 2019–20 2020–21
10	Louis Amundson	120	2001–02 2003–04 2004–05 2005–06

Season
Rk	Player	Blocks	Season
1	Khem Birch	124	2013–14
2	Keon Clark	112	1996–97
3	Joel Anthony	109	2006–07
4	Goodluck Okonoboh	90	2014–15
	Christian Wood	90	2014–15
6	George Ackles	77	1990–91
7	Elmore Spencer	76	1990–91
8	Tyrin Jones	71	2025–26
9	Elmore Spencer	70	1991–92
10	Khem Birch	68	2012–13

Single game
Rk	Player	Blocks	Season	Opponent
1	Joel Anthony	13	2006–07	TCU
