= New Mexico State Aggies men's basketball statistical leaders =

The New Mexico State Aggies men's basketball statistical leaders are individual statistical leaders of the New Mexico State Aggies men's basketball program in various categories, including points, assists, blocks, rebounds, and steals. Within those areas, the lists identify single-game, single-season, and career leaders. The Aggies represent New Mexico State University in the NCAA's Conference USA.

New Mexico State began competing in intercollegiate basketball in 1904. However, the school's record book does not generally list records from before the 1950s, as records from before this period are often incomplete and inconsistent. Since scoring was much lower in this era, and teams played much fewer games during a typical season, it is likely that few or no players from this era would appear on these lists anyway.

The NCAA did not officially record assists as a stat until the 1983–84 season, and blocks and steals until the 1985–86 season, but New Mexico State's record books includes players in these stats before these seasons. These lists are updated through the end of the 2020–21 season.

== Scoring ==
Career
Rk	Player	Points	Seasons
1	Eric Channing	1,862	1998–99 1999–00 2000–01 2001–02
2	Slab Jones	1,758	1976–77 1977–78 1978–79 1979–80
3	Jimmy Collins	1,734	1967–68 1968–69 1969–70
4	Daniel Mullings	1,677	2011–12 2012–13 2013–14 2014–15
5	George Knighton	1,660	1959–60 1960–61 1961–62
6	James Moore	1,651	2000–01 2001–02 2002–03 2003–04
7	Jonathan Gibson	1,541	2006–07 2007–08 2008–09 2009–10
8	Richard Robinson	1,540	1973–74 1974–75 1975–76 1976–77
9	Wendell McKines	1,521	2007–08 2008–09 2009–10 2011–12
10	Jahmar Young	1,479	2007–08 2008–09 2009–10

Season
Rk	Player	Points	Season
1	Jimmy Collins	754	1969–70
2	Pascal Siakam	690	2015–16
3	Jahmar Young	689	2009–10
4	John Williamson	678	1971–72
5	Teddy Allen	668	2021–22
6	Wendell McKines	653	2011–12
7	Zach Lofton	634	2017–18
8	Kenny Travis	606	1986–87
9	Justin Hawkins	597	2007–08
10	Jonathan Gibson	595	2009–10

Single game
Rk	Player	Points	Season	Opponent
1	John Williamson	48	1971–72	California
2	Jimmy Collins	42	1969–70	Montana State
	Jimmy Collins	42	1969–70	Air Force
	Ernest Patterson	42	1982–83	New Mexico
5	Eric Channing	41	2001–02	North Texas
	Teddy Allen	41	2021–22	Abilene Christian
7	George Knighton	40	1961–62	BYU
	John Williamson	40	1972–73	Duquesne
9	Jimmy Collins	39	1967–68	Hardin-Simmons
10	Richard Robinson	38	1975–76	Angelo State

== Rebounds ==
Career
Rk	Player	Rebounds	Seasons
1	Sam Lacey	1,265	1967–68 1968–69 1969–70
2	Wendell McKines	1,135	2007–08 2008–09 2009–10 2011–12
3	Slab Jones	951	1976–77 1977–78 1978–79 1979–80
4	George Knighton	866	1959–60 1960–61 1961–62
5	Billy Joe Price	824	1958–59 1959–60 1960–61
6	Charles Gosa	788	1995–96 1996–97 1997–98 1998–99
7	Johnny McCants	778	2017–18 2018–19 2019–20 2020–21 2021–22
8	Tshilidzi Nephawe	775	2010–11 2011–12 2012–13 2013–14 2014–15
9	Hamidu Rahman	737	2008–09 2009–10 2010–11 2011–12
10	Truman Ward	720	1970–71 1971–72 1972–73

Season
Rk	Player	Rebounds	Season
1	Sam Lacey	493	1969–70
2	Jemerrio Jones	450	2017–18
3	Sam Lacey	396	1968–69
4	Pascal Siakam	396	2015–16
5	Wendell McKines	374	2011–12
6	Billy Joe Price	354	1958–59
7	Sam Lacey	337	1967–68
8	Wendell McKines	319	2008–09
9	George Knighton	317	1960–61
10	Eli Chuha	302	2016–17

Single game
Rk	Player	Rebounds	Season	Opponent
1	Sam Lacey	27	1969–70	Hardin-Simmons
2	Sam Lacey	26	1968–69	Tennessee Tech
3	Sam Lacey	25	1968–69	Idaho State
4	Truman Ward	24	1970–71	Idaho State
	Sam Lacey	24	1969–70	Drake
	Mike Dabich	24	1965–66	West Texas
7	Jemerrio Jones	23	2017–18	UMKC
	Pascal Siakam	23	2015–16	UTEP
	Chris Jackson	23	2002–03	North Texas
	Sam Lacey	23	1968–69	Northern Illinois
	George Knighton	23	1960–61	Utah State

== Assists ==
Career
Rk	Player	Assists	Seasons
1	Sam Crawford	592	1991–92 1992–93
2	Hernst Laroche	552	2008–09 2009–10 2010–11 2011–12
3	Keith Hill	379	1986–87 1987–88 1988–89 1989–90
4	Ian Baker	378	2013–14 2014–15 2015–16 2016–17
5	Ernest Patterson	371	1979–80 1980–81 1981–82 1982–83
6	Steve Colter	347	1980–81 1981–82 1982–83 1983–84
7	Daniel Mullings	342	2011–12 2012–13 2013–14 2014–15
8	William Benjamin	333	1988–89 1989–90 1990–91 1991–92
9	Billy Keys	310	1998–99 1999–00
10	Brandon Mason	302	1999–00 2000–01 2001–02 2002–03

Season
Rk	Player	Assists	Season
1	Sam Crawford	310	1992–93
2	Sam Crawford	282	1991–92
3	Randy Brown	187	1990–91
4	Dominic Ellison	165	1997–98
5	Billy Keys	160	1998–99
6	Hernst Laroche	152	2010–11
7	Keith Johnson	151	1993–94
8	Billy Keys	150	1999–00
9	Alex Scott	149	1971–72
10	Fred Peete	145	2007–08

Single game
Rk	Player	Assists	Season	Opponent
1	Sam Crawford	20	1992–93	Sam Houston State

== Steals ==
Career
Rk	Player	Steals	Seasons
1	Daniel Mullings	249	2011–12 2012–13 2013–14 2014–15
2	Hernst Laroche	216	2008–09 2009–10 2010–11 2011–12
3	William Benjamin	209	1988–89 1989–90 1990–91 1991–92
4	James Moore	174	2000–01 2001–02 2002–03 2003–04
5	Randy Brown	162	1989–90 1990–91
6	Jonathan Gibson	132	2006–07 2007–08 2008–09 2009–10
7	Charles Gosa	126	1995–96 1996–97 1997–98 1998–99
8	Brandon Mason	123	1999–00 2000–01 2001–02 2002–03
9	Thomas Wyatt	119	1993–94 1994–95
10	Ernest Patterson	114	1979–80 1980–81 1981–82 1982–83
	Eric Channing	114	1998–99 1999–00 2000–01 2001–02

Season
Rk	Player	Steals	Season
1	Randy Brown	91	1989–90
2	Daniel Mullings	79	2012–13
3	Randy Brown	71	1990–91
4	William Benjamin	70	1990–91
5	Daniel Mullings	65	2013–14
6	Thomas Wyatt	64	1994–95
	Hernst Laroche	64	2011–12
8	Sam Crawford	62	1991–92
	Hernst Laroche	62	2010–11
10	Troy Brewer	61	1994–95

Single game
Rk	Player	Steals	Season	Opponent
1	Sam Crawford	8	1991–92	Fresno State
	Tyrone Nelson	8	2005–06	New Mexico

== Blocks ==
Career
Rk	Player	Blocks	Seasons
1	James Moore	200	2000–01 2001–02 2002–03 2003–04
2	Sim Bhullar	186	2012–13 2013–14
3	Hamidu Rahman	137	2008–09 2009–10 2010–11 2011–12
	Pascal Siakam	137	2014–15 2015–16
5	Tshilidzi Nephawe	135	2010–11 2011–12 2012–13 2013–14 2014–15
6	Johnny McCants	133	2017–18 2018–19 2019–20 2020–21 2021–22
7	Slab Jones	124	1976–77 1977–78 1978–79 1979–80
8	Charles Gosa	116	1995–96 1996–97 1997–98 1998–99
9	Johnny Roberson	98	1985–86 1986–87 1987–88 1988–89
10	Sam Lacey	92	1967–68 1968–69 1969–70

Season
Rk	Player	Blocks	Season
1	Sim Bhullar	101	2013–14
2	Sim Bhullar	85	2012–13
3	Pascal Siakam	76	2015–16
4	Pascal Siakam	61	2014–15
5	Roland Grant	58	1973–74
6	James Moore	55	2003–04
7	Johnny McCants	54	2021–22
8	Sam Lacey	53	1968–69
9	James Moore	52	2000–01
	Clyde Jordan	52	1994–95
	Tshilidzi Nephawe	52	2013–14

Single game
Rk	Player	Blocks	Season	Opponent
1	James Moore	8	2003–04	North Texas
