= List of Pittsburgh Panthers men's basketball head coaches =

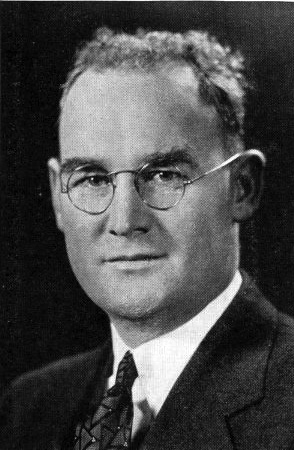
Dr. H.C. "Doc" Carlson

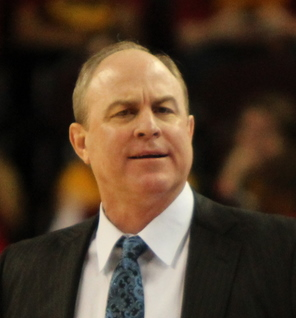
Ben Howland

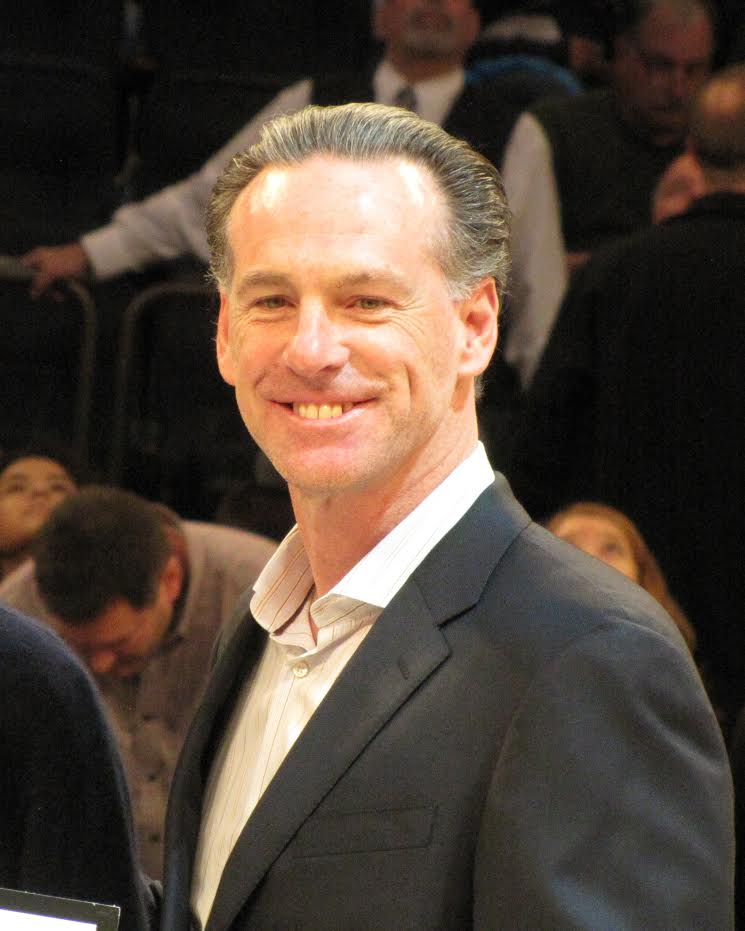
Jamie Dixon

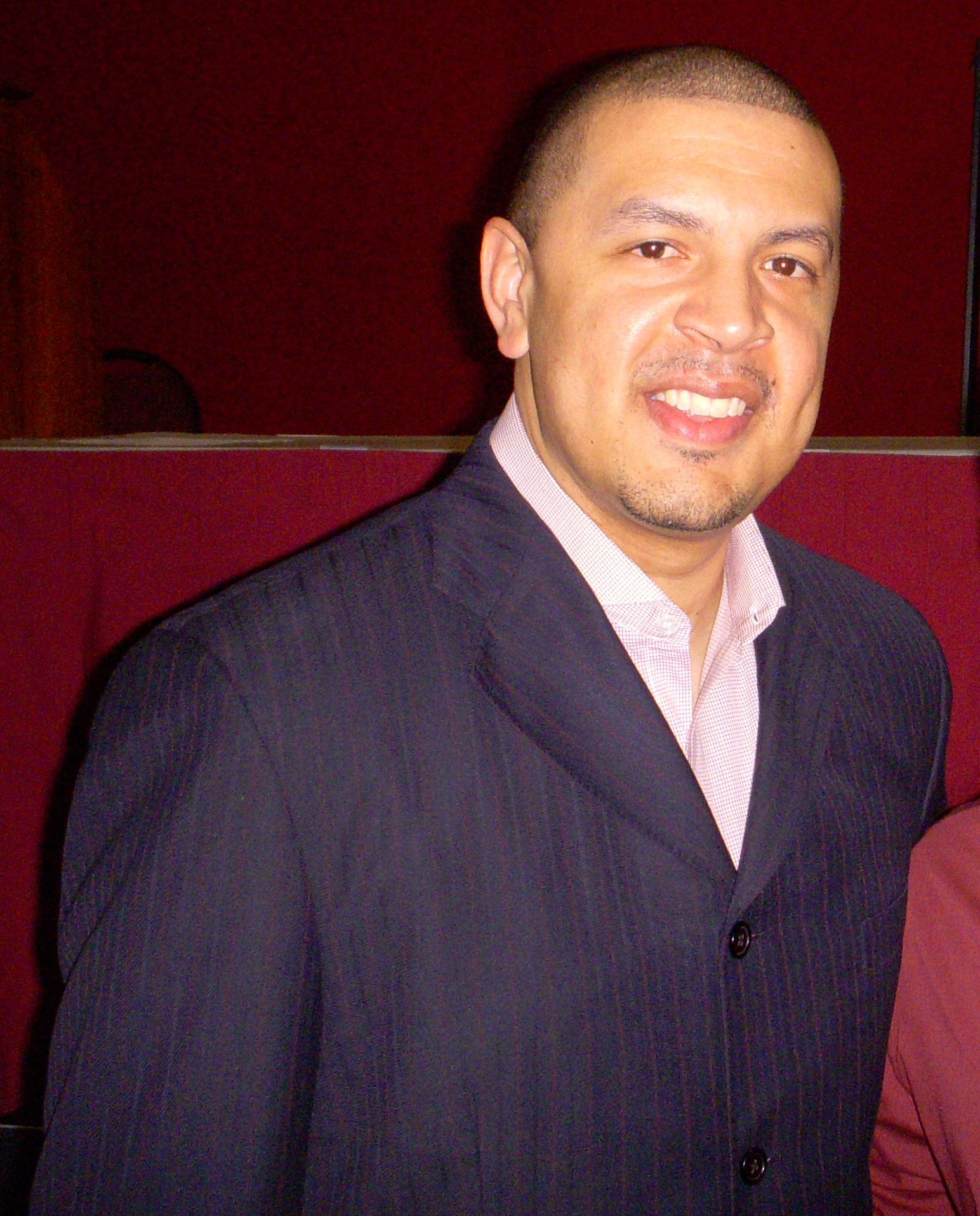
Jeff Capel

The men's college basketball program of the University of Pittsburgh was founded in 1905 and is known competitively as the Pitt Panthers. The team has had 16 head coaches in its history. There were no teams from 1908–1910.

| Years | Duration of head coaching career at Pitt |
| Won | Number of games won at Pitt |
| Lost | Number of games lost at Pitt |
| % | Percentage of games won at Pitt |
| * | Elected to the Naismith Memorial Basketball Hall of Fame as a coach |

Statistics updated through the end of the 2025–26 season

| Head Coach | Years | Won | Lost | % | Ref |
|---|---|---|---|---|---|
| Benjamin Printz | 1905–1907 | 8 | 14 | .364 | |
| Harry Hough | 1907–1908 | 10 | 6 | .625 | |
| Walter "Dutch" Wohlfarth | 1910–1911 | 6 | 6 | .500 | |
| Dr. George Flint | 1911–1921 | 111 | 68 | .620 | |
| Andrew Kerr | 1921–1922 | 12 | 8 | .600 | |
| Dr. H.C. "Doc" Carlson* | 1922–1953 | 367 | 248 | .597 | |
| Robert Timmons | 1953–1968 | 174 | 189 | .479 | |
| Charles "Buzz" Ridl | 1968–1975 | 97 | 83 | .539 | |
| Tim Grgurich | 1975–1980 | 69 | 70 | .496 | |
| Dr. Roy Chipman | 1980–1986 | 102 | 76 | .573 | |
| Paul Evans | 1986–1994 | 147 | 98 | .600 | |
| Ralph Willard | 1994–1999 | 63 | 82 | .434 | |
| Ben Howland | 1999–2003 | 89 | 40 | .690 | |
| Jamie Dixon | 2003–2016 | 328 | 123 | .727 | |
| Kevin Stallings | 2016–2018 | 24 | 41 | .369 | |
| Jeff Capel | 2018–present | 127 | 127 | .500 | |
