= 1990–91 UNLV Runnin' Rebels basketball team =

American college basketball season

1990–91 UNLV Runnin' Rebels basketball

NCAA Division I regular season champions Big West tournament champions Big West Regular Season Champions

NCAA men's Division I tournament, Final Four
- Conference: Big West Conference

Ranking
- Coaches: No. 1
- AP: No. 1
- Record: 34–1 (18–0 Big West)
- Head coach: Jerry Tarkanian (18th season)
- Assistant coaches: Tim Grgurich (10th season); Ron Ganulin (4th season); Ron Adams (1st season)
- Home arena: Thomas and Mack Center

1990–91 Big West men's basketball standings
	Conf.				Overall
Team	W		L	PCT	W		L	PCT
No. 1 UNLV	18	–	0	1.000	34	–	1	.971
No. 15 New Mexico State	15	–	3	.833	23	–	6	.793
Pacific	9	–	9	.500	14	–	15	.483
UC Santa Barbara	8	–	10	.444	14	–	15	.483
Utah State	8	–	10	.444	11	–	17	.393
Cal State Fullerton	7	–	11	.389	14	–	14	.500
Fresno State	7	–	11	.389	14	–	16	.467
Long Beach State	7	–	11	.389	11	–	17	.393
UC Irvine	6	–	12	.333	11	–	19	.367
San Jose State	5	–	13	.278	7	–	20	.259
† 1991 Big West tournament winner Rankings from AP poll

The 1990–91 UNLV Runnin' Rebels basketball team represented the University of Nevada, Las Vegas in NCAA Division I men's competition in the 1990–91 season. The Runnin' Rebels, coached by Jerry Tarkanian, entered the season as defending national champions and entered the 1991 NCAA tournament unbeaten, but lost in the national semifinal to eventual champions Duke when Anderson Hunt's desperation three in the final seconds bounced off the backboard and into the hands of a Duke player, Bobby Hurley, ending a 45-game winning streak that dated back to the previous season. They were the last team to finish the regular season unbeaten before St. Joseph's did it in 2004. They were also the only team since Indiana State in 1979 to enter the NCAA tournament after completing a perfect regular season and winning their postseason conference title until Wichita State did it in 2014.

The team played its home games in the Thomas & Mack Center, and was a member of the Big West Conference.

UNLV’s Final Four loss in the NCAA tournament brought an end to their astounding 45-game win streak. That is the fourth-longest consecutive-game win streak in NCAA Division I basketball history, and the longest win streak since the longest one ever (by UCLA) ended in 1974.

They are often called the greatest college basketball team to not win the championship.

== Roster ==
1990–91 UNLV Runnin' Rebels men's basketball team
Players
Coaches

Pos.	#	Name	Height	Weight	Year	Hometown
F	4	Larry Johnson	6 ft 7 in (2.01 m)	250 lb (113 kg)	Sr	Dallas, TX
G	12	Anderson Hunt	6 ft 1 in (1.85 m)	180 lb (82 kg)	Jr	Detroit, MI
G	13	Travis Bice	6 ft 4 in (1.93 m)	155 lb (70 kg)	Jr	Simi Valley, CA
G	15	Bryan Emerzian	5 ft 11 in (1.8 m)	160 lb (73 kg)	Jr	Waukegan, IL
C	24	Elmore Spencer	7 ft 0 in (2.13 m)	265 lb (120 kg)	Jr	Atlanta, GA
G	30	Dave Rice	6 ft 4 in (1.93 m)	205 lb (93 kg)	Sr	Claremont, CA
F	32	Stacey Augmon	6 ft 8 in (2.03 m)	210 lb (95 kg)	Sr	Pasadena, CA
G/F	33	Barry Young	6 ft 7 in (2.01 m)	200 lb (91 kg)	Sr	Ellicott City, MD
F/C	44	George Ackles	6 ft 9 in (2.06 m)	210 lb (95 kg)	RS Sr	Pittsburgh, PA
G	50	Greg Anthony	6 ft 0 in (1.83 m)	175 lb (79 kg)	Sr	Las Vegas, NV
F	53	Chris Jeter	6 ft 8 in (2.03 m)	215 lb (98 kg)	Sr	San Diego, CA
G		Sean Watkins	—	—	So
F		Byron Wesley	—	—	Sr
G		Dan Bisek	—	—	Sr
G		H Waldman	6 ft 3 in (1.91 m)	195 lb (88 kg)	Fr	Las Vegas, NV

Head coach

- Jerry Tarkanian (Fresno State)

Assistant coach(es)

Legend

- (C) Team captain
- (S) Suspended
- (I) Ineligible
- (W) Walk-on
- Injured
- Current redshirt

1990-91 UNLV Roster and Stats

== Schedule and results ==
Date time, TV	Rank^{#}	Opponent^{#}	Result	Record	High points	High rebounds	High assists	Site (attendance) city, state
Regular Season
Dec 1, 1990*	No. 1	vs. UAB	W 109–68	1–0	26 – Johnson	–	–	BC Place (7,963); Vancouver, BC
Dec 7, 1990*	No. 1	at Nevada	W 131–81	2–0	–	–	–	Lawlor Events Center (11,090); Reno, NV
Dec 15, 1990*	No. 1	vs. No. 21 Michigan State	W 95–75	3–0	35 – Johnson	–	–	The Palace of Auburn Hills (21,454); Auburn Hills, MI
Dec 19, 1990*	No. 1	No. 25 Princeton	W 69–35	4–0	–	–	–	Thomas & Mack Center (17,778); Las Vegas, NV
Dec 22, 1990*	No. 1	Florida State	W 101–69	5–0	–	–	–	Thomas & Mack Center (17,133); Las Vegas, NV
Dec 30, 1990	No. 1	at Pacific	W 92–72	6–0 (1–0)	–	–	–	Alex G. Spanos Center (6,150); Stockton, CA
Jan 2, 1991*	No. 1	at James Madison	W 89–65	7–0	–	–	–	Thomas & Mack Center (17,473); Las Vegas, NV
Jan 4, 1991	No. 1	Cal State Fullerton	W 98–67	8–0 (2–0)	–	–	–	Thomas & Mack Center (18,995); Las Vegas, NV
Jan 7, 1991	No. 1	San Jose State	W 95–63	9–0 (3–0)	–	–	–	Thomas & Mack Center (17,718); Las Vegas, NV
Jan 9, 1991	No. 1	Utah State	W 124–93	10–0 (4–0)	–	–	–	Thomas & Mack Center (18,792); Las Vegas, NV
Jan 12, 1991	No. 1	at Fresno State	W 117–91	11–0 (5–0)	–	–	–	Selland Arena (10,159); Fresno, CA
Jan 17, 1991	No. 1	at UC Irvine	W 117–76	12–0 (6–0)	–	–	–	Bren Events Center (5,005); Irvine, CA
Jan 19, 1991	No. 1	Long Beach State	W 114–63	13–0 (7–0)	–	–	–	Thomas & Mack Center (19,444); Las Vegas, NV
Jan 21, 1991	No. 1	at UC Santa Barbara	W 88–71	14–0 (8–0)	–	–	–	The Thunderdome (6,000); Santa Barbara, CA
Jan 26, 1991*	No. 1	at Louisville	W 97–85	15–0	–	–	–	Freedom Hall (19,465); Louisville, KY
Jan 28, 1991	No. 1	at Utah State	W 126–83	16–0 (9–0)	–	–	–	Dee Glen Smith Spectrum (9,797); Logan, UT
Jan 31, 1991	No. 1	at San Jose State	W 88–64	17–0 (10–0)	–	–	–	The Event Center (4,867); San Jose, CA
Feb 3, 1991*	No. 1	Rutgers	W 115–73	18–0	–	–	–	Thomas & Mack Center (18,954); Las Vegas, NV
Feb 7, 1991	No. 1	Fresno State	W 113–64	19–0 (11–0)	–	–	–	Thomas & Mack Center (18,883); Las Vegas, NV
Feb 10, 1991*	No. 1	at No. 2 Arkansas	W 112–105	20–0	31 – Augmon	14 – Johnson	10 – Anthony	Barnhill Arena (9,640); Fayetteville, AR
Feb 14, 1991	No. 1	UC Santa Barbara	W 98–71	21–0 (12–0)	–	–	–	Thomas & Mack Center (19,147); Las Vegas, NV
Feb 16, 1991	No. 1	No. 12 New Mexico State	W 86–74	22–0 (13–0)	–	–	–	Thomas & Mack Center (18,902); Las Vegas, NV
Feb 18, 1991	No. 1	at Long Beach State	W 122–75	23–0 (14–0)	–	–	–	Long Beach Arena (12,007); Long Beach, CA
Feb 21, 1991	No. 1	Pacific	W 80–59	24–0 (15–0)	–	–	–	Thomas & Mack Center (19,568); Las Vegas, NV
Feb 23, 1991	No. 1	UC Irvine	W 114–86	25–0 (16–0)	–	–	–	Thomas & Mack Center (19,826); Las Vegas, NV
Feb 25, 1991	No. 1	at No. 15 New Mexico State	W 86–74	26–0 (17–0)	24 – Augmon	–	–	Pan American Center (13,007); Las Cruces, NM
Mar 2, 1991	No. 1	at Cal State Fullerton	W 104–83	27–0 (18–0)	–	–	–	Titan Gym (4,032); Fullerton, CA
Big West tournament
Mar 8, 1991*	(1) No. 1	at (8) Long Beach State; Quarterfinals	W 49–29	28–0	–	–	–	Long Beach Arena (11,760); Long Beach, CA
Mar 9, 1991*	(1) No. 1	vs. (5) UC Santa Barbara; Semifinals	W 95–66	29–0	–	–	–	Long Beach Arena (11,283); Long Beach, CA
Mar 10, 1991*	(1) No. 1	vs. (7) Fresno State; Championship	W 98–74	30–0	–	–	–	Long Beach Arena (11,045); Long Beach, CA
NCAA Tournament
Mar 15, 1991*	(1 W) No. 1	vs. (16 W) Montana; First Round	W 99–65	31–0	23 – Johnson	9 – Johnson	9 – Anthony	McKale Center (13,367); Tucson, AZ
Mar 17, 1991*	(1 W) No. 1	vs. (8 W) Georgetown; Second Round	W 62–54	32–0	20 – Johnson	10 – Tied	4 – Anthony	McKale Center (13,497); Tucson, AZ
March 21, 1991*; CBS	(1 W) No. 1	vs. (4 W) No. 10 Utah; Sweet Sixteen	W 83–66	33–0	23 – Johnson	13 – Johnson	10 – Anthony	Kingdome (22,628); Seattle, WA
March 23, 1991*; CBS	(1 W) No. 1	vs. (3 W) No. 13 Seton Hall; Elite Eight	W 77–65	34–0	30 – Johnson	6 – Johnson	11 – Anthony	Kingdome (23,666); Seattle, WA
March 30, 1991*; CBS	(1 W) No. 1	vs. (2 MW) No. 6 Duke; Final Four	L 77–79	34–1	29 – Hunt	13 – Johnson	6 – Anthony	RCA Dome (47,100); Indianapolis, IN
*Non-conference game. ^{#}Rankings from AP Poll. (#) Tournament seedings in parentheses. W=West.

Sources 1990–91 UNLV Schedule and Results

== Rankings ==
Ranking movements Legend: ██ Increase in ranking ██ Decrease in ranking
	Week																
Poll	Pre	1	2	3	4	5	6	7	8	9	10	11	12	13	14	15	Final
AP	1	1	1	1	1	1	1	1	1	1	1	1	1	1	1	1	1
Coaches	1	2	1	1	1	1	1	1	1	1	1	1	1	1	1	1	1

== Awards and honors ==
- Larry Johnson – Naismith College Player of the Year, USBWA College Player of the Year, John R. Wooden Award
- Stacey Augmon – NABC Defensive Player of the Year (3)

== Team players drafted into the NBA ==
Year	Round	Pick	Player	NBA Team
1991	1	1	Larry Johnson	Charlotte Hornets
1991	1	9	Stacey Augmon	Atlanta Hawks
1991	1	12	Greg Anthony	New York Knicks
1991	2	29	George Ackles	Miami Heat
1992	1	25	Elmore Spencer	Los Angeles Clippers
