= List of UNLV Runnin' Rebels head basketball coaches =

The following is a list of UNLV Runnin' Rebels men's basketball head coaches at the University of Nevada Las Vegas in Las Vegas, Nevada. The UNLV Runnin' Rebels men's basketball program has been led by 17 head coaches in their history. 15 of the 17 coaches have winning records at UNLV.

Jerry Tarkanian led UNLV to the NCAA Division I Tournament Championship in 1990 and the NCAA Division I Men's Final Four in 1977, 1987, 1990 and 1991.

Jerry Tarkanian was inducted into the Naismith Basketball Hall of Fame. Rollie Massimino was inducted into the College Basketball Hall of Fame.

Tenure	Coach	Record	Pct.
1969–1970	Rolland Todd	17–9	.654
1970–1973	John Bayer	43–37	.538
1973–1992	Jerry Tarkanian	509–105	.829
1992–1994	Rollie Massimino	36–21	.632
1994–1995	Cleveland Edwards	5–9	.357
1994–1995	Howie Landa	5–2	.714
1994–1995	Tim Grgurich	2–5	.286
1995–2001	Bill Bayno	94–64	.595
2000–2001	Max Good	13–9	.591
2001–2004	Charlie Spoonhour	51–31	.635
2003–2004	Jay Spoonhour	6–4	.600
2004–2011	Lon Kruger	161–71	.694
2011–2016	Dave Rice	98–54	.645
2015–2016	Todd Simon	9–8	.529
2016–2019	Marvin Menzies	48–48	.500
2019–2021	T. J. Otzelberger	29–30	.492
2021–2025	Kevin Kruger	58-40	.592
2025–present	Josh Pastner	18–17	.514
