= 1991–92 UC Irvine Anteaters men's basketball team =

American college basketball season

1991–92 UC Irvine Anteaters men's basketball
- Conference: Big West Conference
- Record: 7–22 (3–15 Big West)
- Head coach: Rod Baker (1st season)
- Home arena: Bren Events Center

1991–92 Big West men's basketball standings
	Conf.				Overall
Team	W		L	PCT	W		L	PCT
No. 7 UNLV	18	–	0	1.000	26	–	2	.929
UC Santa Barbara	13	–	5	.722	20	–	9	.690
New Mexico State†	12	–	6	.667	25	–	8	.758
Long Beach State	11	–	7	.611	18	–	12	.600
Utah State	10	–	8	.556	16	–	12	.571
Pacific	8	–	10	.444	14	–	16	.467
Cal State Fullerton	8	–	10	.444	12	–	16	.429
Fresno State	6	–	12	.333	15	–	16	.484
UC Irvine	3	–	15	.167	7	–	22	.241
San Jose State	1	–	17	.056	2	–	24	.077
† 1992 Big West tournament winner Rankings from AP poll

The 1991–92 UC Irvine Anteaters men's basketball team represented the University of California, Irvine during the 1991–92 NCAA Division I men's basketball season. The Anteaters were led by first year head coach Rod Baker and played at the Bren Events Center. They were members of the Big West Conference.

== Previous season ==
The 1990–91 UC Irvine Anteaters men's basketball team finished the season with a record of 11–19 and 6–12 in Big West play. On 14 February 1991, Mulligan announced that he will resign as head coach at the end of the season. Seton Hall assistant Rod Baker was hired on 9 April 1991 to become the fifth head coach in anteater history.

== Roster ==
1991–92 UC Irvine Anteaters men's basketball team
Players
Coaches

Pos.	#	Name	Height	Weight	Year	Hometown
F		Khalid Channell	6 ft 7 in (2.01 m)	—	Fr
G		David Hollaway	6 ft 2 in (1.88 m)	—	Sr
F		Khari Johnson	6 ft 6 in (1.98 m)	—	So
F		Elzie Love	6 ft 6 in (1.98 m)	—	Fr
F		Craig Marshall	6 ft 2 in (1.88 m)	—	Jr
C		Don May	6 ft 9 in (2.06 m)	—	Sr
G		Gerald McDonald	6 ft 0 in (1.83 m)	—	Sr
C		Uzoma Obiekea	6 ft 7 in (2.01 m)	—	Jr
F		Elgin Rogers	6 ft 6 in (1.98 m)	—	Sr
G		Justin Ross	6 ft 4 in (1.93 m)	—	Fr
G		Keith Stewart	5 ft 11 in (1.8 m)	—	Jr
F		Jeff Von Lutzow	6 ft 9 in (2.06 m)	—	Jr
G		Zuri Williams	6 ft 2 in (1.88 m)	—	Fr

Head coach

Rod Baker (College of the Holy Cross)

Assistant coach(es)

Legend

- (C) Team captain
- (S) Suspended
- (I) Ineligible
- (W) Walk-on
- Injured
- Current redshirt

Roster
Last update: September 19, 2017

== Schedule ==
Date time, TV	Rank^{#}	Opponent^{#}	Result	Record	Site (attendance) city, state
Non-Conference Season
November 30, 1991*		San Diego State	W 79–64	1–0	Bren Events Center (2,169); Irvine, CA
December 2, 1991*		Colorado	L 70–73 ^{2OT}	1–1	Bren Events Center (2,206); Irvine, CA
December 6, 1991*		Houston; Disneyland Freedom Bowl Classic	L 51–73	1–2	Bren Events Center (2,781); Irvine, CA
December 7, 1991*		USC; Disneyland Freedom Bowl Classic	L 71–80	1–3	Bren Events Center (3,316); Irvine, CA
December 16, 1991*		at Loyola Marymount	L 84–95	1–4	Gersten Pavilion (1,589); Los Angeles, CA
December 19, 1991*		at Loyola–Chicago	L 51–84	1–5	Alumni Gym (1,047); Chicago, IL
December 21, 1991*		at Bradley	W 61–57 ^{OT}	2–5	Carver Arena (6,730); Peoria, IL
December 28, 1991*		Lafayette	W 64–56	3–5	Bren Events Center (1,273); Irvine, CA
December 30, 1991*		Tulane	L 77–96	3–6	Bren Events Center (1,591); Irvine, CA
Conference Season
January 2, 1992		New Mexico State	L 71–75	3–7 (0–1)	Bren Events Center (2,372); Irvine, CA
January 4, 1992; 7:35 p.m.		UNLV	L 57–71	3–8 (0–2)	Bren Events Center (5,006); Irvine, CA
January 9, 1992		at Utah State	L 63–81	3–9 (0–3)	Smith Spectrum (6,430); Logan, UT
January 11, 1992		at Fresno State	L 55–82	3–10 (0–4)	Selland Arena (10,159); Fresno, CA
January 18, 1992		Cal State Fullerton	L 83–86	3–11 (0–5)	Bren Events Center (3,412); Irvine, CA
January 20, 1992; 8:05 p.m.		at No. 25 UNLV	L 52–71	3–12 (0–6)	Thomas & Mack Center (14,309); Paradise, NV
January 23, 1992		Long Beach State	L 79–82 ^{OT}	3–13 (0–7)	Bren Events Center (2,245); Irvine, CA
January 25, 1992		UC Santa Barbara	L 59–61	3–14 (0–8)	Bren Events Center (3,326); Irvine, CA
January 30, 1992		at Pacific	L 59–65	3–15 (0–9)	Alex G. Spanos Center (2,952); Stockton, CA
February 1, 1992		at San Jose State	L 52–58	3–16 (0–10)	Event Center Arena (1,314); San Jose, CA
February 6, 1992		Fresno State	W 76–68	4–16 (1–10)	Bren Events Center (1,533); Irvine, CA
February 8, 1992		Utah State	W 80–75	5–16 (2–10)	Bren Events Center (1,489); Irvine, CA
February 15, 1992		at Cal State Fullerton	L 68–86	5–17 (2–11)	Titan Gym (2,315); Fullerton, CA
February 20, 1992		at UC Santa Barbara	L 74–80	5–18 (2–12)	UC Santa Barbara Events Center (4,418); Santa Barbara, CA
February 22, 1992		at Long Beach State	L 72–89	5–19 (2–13)	Gold Mine (1,565); Long Beach, CA
February 27, 1992		San Jose State	W 78–65	6–19 (3–13)	Bren Events Center (1,389); Irvine, CA
February 29, 1992		Pacific	L 66–79	6–20 (3–14)	Bren Events Center (1,722); Irvine, CA
March 7, 1992		at New Mexico State	L 71–99	6–21 (3–15)	Pan American Center (9,231); Las Cruces, NM
Big West Conference tournament
March 13, 1992	(8)	vs. (1) UC Santa Barbara; Quarterfinals	W 88–67	7–21	Long Beach Arena (4,134); Long Beach, CA
March 14, 1992	(8)	(5) Pacific; Semifinals	L 69–81	7–22	Long Beach Arena (3,373); Long Beach, CA
*Non-conference game. ^{#}Rankings from AP Poll. (#) Tournament seedings in parentheses. All times are in Pacific Time.
