= 1991–92 UNLV Runnin' Rebels basketball team =

American college basketball season

1991–92 UNLV Runnin' Rebels basketball
- Conference: Big West Conference

Ranking
- Coaches: No. 7
- AP: No. 7
- Record: 26–2 (18–0 Big West)
- Head coach: Jerry Tarkanian (19th season)
- Assistant coach: Tim Grgurich (11th season)
- Home arena: Thomas and Mack Center

1991–92 Big West men's basketball standings
| | Conf. | | | | Overall |
| Team | W | | L | PCT | W | | L | PCT |
|---|---|---|---|---|---|---|---|---|
| No. 7 UNLV | 18 | – | 0 | 1.000 | 26 | – | 2 | .929 |
| UC Santa Barbara | 13 | – | 5 | .722 | 20 | – | 9 | .690 |
| New Mexico State† | 12 | – | 6 | .667 | 25 | – | 8 | .758 |
| Long Beach State | 11 | – | 7 | .611 | 18 | – | 12 | .600 |
| Utah State | 10 | – | 8 | .556 | 16 | – | 12 | .571 |
| Pacific | 8 | – | 10 | .444 | 14 | – | 16 | .467 |
| Cal State Fullerton | 8 | – | 10 | .444 | 12 | – | 16 | .429 |
| Fresno State | 6 | – | 12 | .333 | 15 | – | 16 | .484 |
| UC Irvine | 3 | – | 15 | .167 | 7 | – | 22 | .241 |
| San Jose State | 1 | – | 17 | .056 | 2 | – | 24 | .077 |
† 1992 Big West tournament winner Rankings from AP poll

The 1991–92 UNLV Runnin' Rebels basketball team represented the University of Nevada, Las Vegas in NCAA Division I men's competition in the 1991–92 season. The head coach was Jerry Tarkanian, entering his 19th season. The team played its home games in the Thomas & Mack Center, and was a member of the Big West Conference. Due to improper benefits violations, the Runnin' Rebels were placed on probation and banned from competing in the 1992 the Big West Conference Tournament and NCAA Tournament.

UNLV was banned from live television, becoming the last basketball team, men's or women's, to receive this punishment. Two football teams, Auburn in 1993 and Ole Miss in 1995, were the last in any sport to be kept off of TV.

Tarkanian resigned at the end of the season and was replaced by Villanova coach Rollie Massimino.

== Roster ==
1991–92 UNLV Runnin' Rebels men's basketball team
Players
Coaches

| Pos. | # | Name | Height | Weight | Year | Hometown |
|---|---|---|---|---|---|---|
| G | 4 | Isaiah Rider | 6 ft 5 in (1.96 m) | 215 lb (98 kg) | Jr | Oakland, CA |
| C | 24 | Elmore Spencer | 7 ft 0 in (2.13 m) | 270 lb (122 kg) | Sr | Atlanta, GA |
| G | 24 | Dexter Boney | 6 ft 4 in (1.93 m) | 185 lb (84 kg) | Jr | Wilmington, DE |
| G | 23 | Evric Gray | 6 ft 7 in (2.01 m) | 235 lb (107 kg) | Jr | Bloomington, CA |
| C | 40 | Melvin Love | 6 ft 9 in (2.06 m) | 250 lb (113 kg) | Sr | San Bernardino, CA |
| G | 03 | Reggie Manuel | 6 ft 3 in (1.91 m) | 205 lb (93 kg) | Fr | Macon, GA |
| F | 31 | H Waldman | 6 ft 3 in (1.91 m) | 200 lb (91 kg) | So | Las Vegas, NV |
| G | 11 | Dedan Thomas | 6 ft 0 in (1.83 m) | 170 lb (77 kg) | So | Los Angeles, CA |
| F | 42 | Bobby Joyce | 6 ft 7 in (2.01 m) | 245 lb (111 kg) | Jr | Santa Ana, CA |
| F | 31 | Danny Griffin | 6 ft 9 in (2.06 m) | 255 lb (116 kg) | So | Los Angeles, CA |
| F | 05 | Clint Clausen | 6 ft 5 in (1.96 m) | 190 lb (86 kg) | Jr | Tucson, AZ |
| G | 15 | Bryan Emerzian | 6 ft 0 in (1.83 m) | 165 lb (75 kg) | Sr | Chicago, IL |
| F | 14 | Jason Brooks | 5 ft 10 in (1.78 m) | — | Jr |

Head coach

- Jerry Tarkanian (Fresno State)

Assistant coach(es)

Legend

- (C) Team captain
- (S) Suspended
- (I) Ineligible
- (W) Walk-on
- Injured
- Current redshirt

1991-92 UNLV Roster and Stats

== Schedule and results ==
| Date time, TV | Rank^{#} | Opponent^{#} | Result | Record | High points | High rebounds | High assists | Site (attendance) city, state |
Regular Season
| Nov 23, 1991*; 10:30 PM | | at BYU-Hawaii | W 97–69 | 1–0 | 27 – Boney | 8 – Spencer | – | George Q. Cannon Activities Center (2,066); Laie, HI |
| Nov 30, 1991*; 8:05 PM | | No. 9 LSU | W 76–55 | 2–0 | 21 – Rider | 12 – Spencer | – | Thomas & Mack Center (17,436); Las Vegas, Nevada |
| Dec 5, 1991*; 4:30 PM | No. 24 | at James Madison | W 80–73 | 3–0 | 22 – Boney | 11 – Elmore | – | JMU Convocation Center (7,800); Harrisonburg, Virginia |
| Dec 7, 1991*; 4:30 PM | No. 24 | at Rutgers | L 85–91 | 3–1 | 30 – Rider | 8 – Spencer | – | Louis Brown Athletic Center (8,917); Piscataway, New Jersey |
| Dec 14, 1991*; 5:30 PM | | at No. 21 Missouri | L 78–90 | 3–2 | 18 – Rider | 9 – Spencer | – | Hearnes Center (13,300); Columbia, Missouri |
| Dec 17, 1991*; 8:05 PM | | Auburn | W 85–82 | 4–2 | 31 – Spencer | 9 – Love | – | Thomas & Mack Center (15,064); Las Vegas, Nevada |
| Dec 21, 1991*; 1:00 PM | | vs. Eastern Michigan | W 79–59 | 5–2 | 15 – Tied | 8 – Gray | – | The Palace of Auburn Hills (11,342); Auburn Hills, Michigan |
| Dec 23, 1991*; 8:05 PM | | Lamar | W 100–75 | 6–2 | 28 – Rider | 8 – Tied | – | Thomas & Mack Center (15,023); Las Vegas, Nevada |
| Dec 28, 1991*; 8:05 PM | | Nevada-Reno | W 93–72 | 7–2 | 20 – Rider | 11 – Love | – | Thomas & Mack Center (16,565); Las Vegas, Nevada |
| Dec 30, 1991*; 8:05 PM | | San Diego State | W 88–72 | 8–2 | 28 – Gray | 10 – Gray | – | Thomas & Mack Center (14,307); Las Vegas, Nevada |
| Jan 2, 1992; 7:30 PM | | at Cal State Fullerton | W 86–74 | 9–2 (1–0) | 22 – Rider | 11 – Tied | – | Titan Gym (3,702); Fullerton, California |
| Jan 4, 1992; 7:35 PM | | at UC Irvine | W 71–57 | 10–2 (2–0) | 18 – Rider | 9 – Spencer | – | Bren Events Center (5,006); Irvine, California |
| Jan 9, 1992; 8:05 PM | | Long Beach State | W 88–63 | 11–2 (3–0) | 28 – Gray | 8 – Spencer | – | Thomas & Mack Center (14,390); Las Vegas, Nevada |
| Jan 11, 1992; 8:05 PM | | at UC Santa Barbara | W 78–54 | 12–2 (4–0) | 20 – Rider | 13 – Spencer | – | Thomas & Mack Center (16,125); Las Vegas, Nevada |
| Jan 16, 1992; 7:30 PM | | at Pacific | W 70–52 | 13–2 (5–0) | 19 – Rider | 11 – Spencer | – | Alex G. Spanos Center (5,393); Stockton, California |
| Jan 18, 1992; 7:45 PM | | at San Jose State | W 79–67 | 14–2 (6–0) | 27 – Rider | 11 – Spencer | – | The Event Center (3,215); San Jose, California |
| Jan 20, 1992; 8:05 PM | No. 25 | UC Irvine | W 71–52 | 15–2 (7–0) | 25 – Rider | 6 – Love | – | Thomas & Mack Center (14,309); Las Vegas, Nevada |
| Jan 23, 1992; 8:05 PM | No. 25 | Fresno State | W 58–50 | 16–2 (8–0) | 16 – Boney | 9 – Spencer | – | Thomas & Mack Center (14,844); Las Vegas, NV |
| Jan 25, 1992; 6:30 PM | No. 25 | at New Mexico State | W 74–67 | 17–2 (9–0) | 26 – Rider | 9 – Spencer | – | Pan American Center (13,071); Las Cruces, New Mexico |
| Jan 30, 1992; 6:30 PM | No. 21 | at Utah State | W 85–80 | 18–2 (10–0) | 27 – Spencer | 10 – Spencer | – | Dee Glen Smith Spectrum (10,248); Logan, Utah |
| Feb 6, 1992; 7:30 PM | No. 17 | at UC Santa Barbara | W 78–54 | 19–2 (11–0) | 26 – Spencer | 7 – Rider | – | The Thunderdome (6,000); Santa Barbara, California |
| Feb 9, 1992; 3:00 PM | No. 17 | at No. 12 Long Beach State | W 88–63 | 20–2 (12–0) | 32 – Rider | 8 – Tied | – | Gold Mine (5,340); Long Beach, California |
| Feb 13, 1992; 8:05 PM | No. 15 | San Jose State | W 79–67 | 21–2 (13–0) | 19 – Rider | 11 – Boney | – | Thomas & Mack Center (14,850); Las Vegas, Nevada |
| Feb 15, 1992; 8:05 PM | No. 15 | Pacific | W 70–52 | 22–2 (14–0) | 15 – Spencer | 15 – Spencer | – | Thomas & Mack Center (14,820); Las Vegas, NV |
| Feb 17, 1992; 8:05 PM | No. 12 | Cal State Fullerton | W 76–47 | 23–2 (15–0) | 23 – Rider | 10 – Spencer | – | Thomas & Mack Center (14,275); Las Vegas, Nevada |
| Feb 22, 1992; 8:05 PM | No. 12 | No. 15 New Mexico State | W 69–58 | 24–2 (16–0) | 27 – Rider | 7 – Rider | – | Thomas & Mack Center (17,375); Las Vegas, Nevada |
| Feb 27, 1992; 7:30 PM | No. 7 | at Fresno State | W 84–67 | 25–2 (17–0) | 22 – Rider | 8 – Gray | – | Selland Arena (10,159); Fresno, California |
| Mar 3, 1992; 7:35 PM | No. 6 | Utah State | W 65–53 | 26–2 (18–0) | 15 – Rider | 8 – Tied | – | Thomas & Mack Center (18,944); Las Vegas, NV |
*Non-conference game. ^{#}Rankings from AP Poll. (#) Tournament seedings in parentheses. W=West.

Sources 1991-92 UNLV Schedule and Results

== Rankings ==
NOTE: Due to UNLV being on major NCAA probation, the Rebels were ineligible to be ranked in the coaches poll.

Ranking movements Legend: ██ Increase in ranking ██ Decrease in ranking
| | Week | | | | | | | | | | | | | | | | |
| Poll | Pre | 1 | 2 | 3 | 4 | 5 | 6 | 7 | 8 | 9 | 10 | 11 | 12 | 13 | 14 | 15 | Final |
|---|---|---|---|---|---|---|---|---|---|---|---|---|---|---|---|---|---|
| AP | | | 24 | | | | | | | 25 | 21 | 17 | 15 | 12 | 7 | 6 | 7 |
| Coaches | | | | | | | | | | | | | | | | | |

== Team players drafted into the NBA ==
| Year | Round | Pick | Player | NBA Team |
|---|---|---|---|---|
| 1992 | 1 | 25 | Elmore Spencer | Los Angeles Clippers |
| 1993 | 1 | 5 | Isaiah Rider | Minnesota Timberwolves |
