= 1990 Big West Conference men's basketball tournament =

- Classification: Division I
- Season: 1989–90
- Teams: 10
- Site: Long Beach Arena; Long Beach, CA
- Champions: UNLV (6th title)
- Winning coach: Jerry Tarkanian (6th title)
- MVP: Larry Johnson (UNLV)

1989–90 Big West men's basketball standings
	Conf.				Overall
Team	W		L	PCT	W		L	PCT
No. 24 New Mexico State	16	–	2	.889	26	–	5	.839
No. 2 UNLV†	16	–	2	.889	35	–	5	.875
UC Santa Barbara	13	–	5	.722	21	–	9	.700
Long Beach State	12	–	6	.667	23	–	9	.719
Utah State	8	–	10	.444	14	–	16	.467
Pacific	7	–	11	.389	15	–	14	.517
Cal State Fullerton	6	–	12	.333	13	–	16	.448
San Jose State	5	–	13	.278	8	–	20	.286
Fresno State	4	–	14	.222	10	–	19	.345
UC Irvine	3	–	15	.167	5	–	23	.179
† 1990 Big West tournament winner Rankings from AP poll

The 1990 Big West Conference men's basketball tournament was held March 7–10 at the Long Beach Arena in Long Beach, California.

Defending champions UNLV defeated fourth-seeded Long Beach State in the final, 92–74, and captured their sixth PCAA/Big West championship. This was the Runnin' Rebels' sixth title in eight seasons.

UNLV, in turn, received an automatic bid to the 1990 NCAA tournament, which they would go on to win. Fellow Big West members New Mexico State and UC Santa Barbara received at-large bids.

== Format ==
There were no changes to the tournament format from 1989. All ten conference members participated in the field, with teams seeded in the bracket based on regular season conference records.

The top six seeds were given a bye into the quarterfinal round while the four lowest-seeded teams were placed into an initial preliminary round.

== Bracket ==
First round Wednesday, March 7
9	Fresno State	71
8	San José State	56
7	Cal State Fullerton	82
10	UC Irvine	63

Quarterfinals; Thursday, March 8
1	#23 New Mexico State	72
9	Fresno State	66
5	Utah State	68
4	Long Beach State	86
3	UC Santa Barbara	62
6	Pacific	65
2	#3 UNLV	115
7	Cal State Fullerton	93

Semifinals; Friday, March 9
1	#23 New Mexico State	85
4	Long Beach State	90
6	Pacific	72
2	#3 UNLV	99

Championship; Saturday, March 10
4	Long Beach State	74
2	#3 UNLV	92
