= 1991 Big West Conference men's basketball tournament =

Basketball Tournament in Long Beach, CA

- Classification: Division I
- Season: 1990–91
- Teams: 8
- Site: Long Beach Arena; Long Beach, CA
- Champions: UNLV (7th title)
- Winning coach: Jerry Tarkanian (7th title)
- MVP: Larry Johnson (UNLV)

1990–91 Big West men's basketball standings
	Conf.				Overall
Team	W		L	PCT	W		L	PCT
No. 1 UNLV	18	–	0	1.000	34	–	1	.971
No. 15 New Mexico State	15	–	3	.833	23	–	6	.793
Pacific	9	–	9	.500	14	–	15	.483
UC Santa Barbara	8	–	10	.444	14	–	15	.483
Utah State	8	–	10	.444	11	–	17	.393
Cal State Fullerton	7	–	11	.389	14	–	14	.500
Fresno State	7	–	11	.389	14	–	16	.467
Long Beach State	7	–	11	.389	11	–	17	.393
UC Irvine	6	–	12	.333	11	–	19	.367
San Jose State	5	–	13	.278	7	–	20	.259
† 1991 Big West tournament winner Rankings from AP poll

The 1991 Big West Conference men's basketball tournament was held March 8–10 at the Long Beach Arena in Long Beach, California.

Defending national and conference champions UNLV defeated seventh-seeded Fresno State in the final, 98–74, capturing their seventh PCAA/Big West championship. This was the Runnin' Rebels' seventh title in their nine seasons in the Big West.

UNLV subsequently received an automatic bid to the 1991 NCAA tournament, where they would advance to the Final Four. Fellow Big West member New Mexico State received an at-large bid.

== Format ==
After three seasons as a ten-team tournament, the Big West reverted to the eight-team format that it used prior to the 1988 season. In turn, only the top eight teams, based on regular season conference records, qualified for the tournament field. The two teams with the worst records were excluded.

All eight teams were entered in the initial round, paired and seeded based on record.

== Bracket ==
First round Friday, March 8
1	#1 UNLV	49
8	Long Beach State	29
5	UC Santa Barbara	80
4	Utah State	76
3	Pacific	74
6	Cal State Fullerton	67
7	Fresno State	88
2	#11 New Mexico State	82

Semifinals; Saturday, March 9
1	#1 UNLV	95
5	UC Santa Barbara	66
3	Pacific	70
7	Fresno State	87

Championship; Sunday, March 10
1	#1 UNLV	98
7	Fresno State	74
