= Amoeba defense =

Defensive strategy in basketball

The amoeba defense is a defensive strategy in the game of basketball.

== History ==
The amoeba defense was developed by Fran Webster, an assistant for the Pittsburgh Panthers men's basketball team. In the 1970s, Webster perfected the defense with Pittsburgh head coaches Charles Ridl and Tim Grgurich. Grgurich later became an assistant to UNLV coach Jerry Tarkanian, who utilized the defense himself. Pitt used the defense extensively in their 1974 season run to the Elite 8, winning 22 straight games in the process, before losing to eventual National Champion, North Carolina State in the East Region Finals (Elite 8).

== Function ==
The amoeba defense is a basketball defense used to wear down an offense. It is a risky defense that mixes the man-to-man and zone defenses together. The defense is set up like a diamond. The two quickest players, usually the point and shooting guards, should be set at the top of the key and just above the free throw line, while your biggest defender, most commonly the center or power forward, is set up under the basket and your other two defenders are set up on opposite sides of the lane just below the elbows.

=== Defending passes to the wing ===
The defender at the top of the key picks up the dribbler advancing up the court. The defender at the free throw line then sprints out and picks up the entry pass. The top defender then drops back to the free throw line where the defender now guarding the ball previously had been. If the ball handler begins to dribble the defender just below the elbow on the same side as the ball would then double team the ball handler with the defender already defending the ball. The defender below the opposite elbow then drops under the basket while the defender that was previously under the basket fronts the offensive player on the post. The defender originally at the top of the key is now at the free throw line anticipating the next pass in hopes of intercepting the pass and starting a fast break.

=== Defending passes to the corner ===
When the ball is passed into the corner the defender who started under the basket should sprint out to the ball. The defender originally playing below the elbow then drops to front the offensive post player. The defender originally at the free throw line is now on the wing denying the pass back up to the wing. The defender originally occupying the space below the elbow on the opposite side of the ball has now dropped under the basket and has backside responsibility while the defender originally at the top of the key sits at the free throw line and has top side responsibility.

=== Defending skip passes ===
In the event of a skip pass the defender with backside responsibility would sprint out to guard the ball. The defender guarding the ball then shifts back under the basket where they started. The defender who had been fronting the post then sprints over to the position just under the elbow on the opposite side. The defender at the free throw line then sprints out to deny the pass back to the top while the defender that had previously been denying the pass to the wing shifts back to the free throw line where they originally started.

=== Defending a two-guard front ===
A two-guard front is a different offensive formation in which two players begin at the top of the key, one player plays the high post and the other two players are positioned just above the baseline outside the three-point line. When defending against a two guard front in the amoeba defense the formation changes from a diamond shape to a 2-1-2 defense. The top two defenders who we first stacked at the free throw line and top of the key come up to defend the two guards. The defender under the basket then comes up to the free throw line and guards behind the high post. While the defenders on either side of the lane stay put to guard the pass to the corner. Ideally the ball handler would pass the ball to the high post. In that situation both defenders up top both drop down to the free throw line to triple team the high post. The high post would, in the perfect situation, panic and make a bad pass. The two defenders down low should then anticipate the pass and intercept it.

In the event that the triple team fails and the high post is able to make a pass to the wing the defender closest to the ball must sprint out to defend it. The defender that started guarding the high post then retreats to the post while the defender playing on the side of the lane closest to the ball sprints out and defends the pass to the corner. The last defender left that was previously triple teaming stays at the free throw line to deny the post and the defender playing on the opposite side of the lane drops under the basket. The defender now denying the pass to the high post now has to deny passes to the high post, wing and cross court. It is critical that the players denying passes to the high post and wing in this situation are your quickest players.

== Advantages and disadvantages ==
The amoeba defense is a gambling defense; if used correctly it can lead to many fast breaks and easy layups, although if beaten the defense almost always leads to an uncontested layup or open shot. When used in cooperation with the man-to-man defense it can disrupt any offense and lead to many scoring streaks. Since the defense was developed, many high school and college teams such as Mississippi have been very successful when using the defense in combination with other defenses. The defense is seen more in younger play because professional athletes are much faster and much better shooters. The amoeba defense is a gambling defense so there may be cases in which the other team may be given easy opportunities to score. When anticipating a pass a defender may miss an interception in some cases leaving the defender wide open for a shot. In the case that a triple team occurs, if a pass is made an offensive player may be left wide open for a shot if the defender does not close out quickly enough. The defense packs into the middle of the lane so when playing a better shooting team it may be a smarter choice to stick to a man-to-man or zone defense.

== Sources ==
- Podias, Steve (October 2001). "Brooklyn College's Amoeba Defense". Coach and Athletic Director. pp. 30–33 – via EBSCOhost.
- Webster, F. Basketball's amoeba defense: complete multiple system. West Nyack, N.Y.: Parker Pub. Co., 1984. Print.
