= 1989–90 UC Santa Barbara Gauchos men's basketball team =

American college basketball season

1989–90 UC Santa Barbara Gauchos men's basketball

NCAA tournament, second round
- Conference: Big West Conference
- Record: 21–9 (13–5 Big West)
- Head coach: Jerry Pimm (7th season)
- Home arena: The Thunderdome

1989–90 Big West men's basketball standings
	Conf.				Overall
Team	W		L	PCT	W		L	PCT
No. 24 New Mexico State	16	–	2	.889	26	–	5	.839
No. 2 UNLV†	16	–	2	.889	35	–	5	.875
UC Santa Barbara	13	–	5	.722	21	–	9	.700
Long Beach State	12	–	6	.667	23	–	9	.719
Utah State	8	–	10	.444	14	–	16	.467
Pacific	7	–	11	.389	15	–	14	.517
Cal State Fullerton	6	–	12	.333	13	–	16	.448
San Jose State	5	–	13	.278	8	–	20	.286
Fresno State	4	–	14	.222	10	–	19	.345
UC Irvine	3	–	15	.167	5	–	23	.179
† 1990 Big West tournament winner Rankings from AP poll

The 1989–90 UC Santa Barbara Gauchos men's basketball team represented the University of California, Santa Barbara during the 1989–90 college basketball season. They were led by head coach Jerry Pimm in his 7th season at UCSB. The Gauchos were members of the Big West Conference and played their home games at the UC Santa Barbara Events Center, also known as The Thunderdome.

UCSB finished the season 21–9, 13–5 in Big West play to finish third in the conference regular season standings. They received an at-large bid to the NCAA tournament. As the No. 9 seed in the Southeast Region, they beat Houston in the first round before losing to No. 1 seed Michigan State in the second round.

The season was a memorable one for UCSB fans. The 1989–90 team beat eventual National champion UNLV in front of a raucous crown at The Thunderdome on February 26, 1990. It would end up being UNLV's only loss over a stretch of 55 games between the 1989–90 and 1990–91 seasons. The Gauchos also won the first NCAA Tournament game in school history.

== Roster ==
1989–90 UC Santa Barbara Gauchos men's basketball team
Players
Coaches

Pos.	#	Name	Height	Weight	Year	Hometown
G	3	Idris Jones	6 ft 3 in (1.91 m)	—	Fr
G	15	Carrick DeHart	6 ft 4 in (1.93 m)	—	Sr	Inglewood, California
F	34	Lucius Davis	6 ft 8 in (2.03 m)	—	So
F	35	Gary Gray	6 ft 9 in (2.06 m)	—	Jr
F	55	Eric McArthur	6 ft 7 in (2.01 m)	—	Sr	South Pasadena, California

Head coach

- Jerry Pimm (USC)

Assistant coach(es)

Legend

- (C) Team captain
- (S) Suspended
- (I) Ineligible
- (W) Walk-on
- Injured
- Current redshirt

== Schedule and results ==
Date time, TV	Rank^{#}	Opponent^{#}	Result	Record	Site (attendance) city, state
Regular season
Nov 25, 1989*		Pepperdine	W 67–46	1–0	The Thunderdome; Santa Barbara, California
Nov 28, 1989*		at San Diego	W 79–62	2–0	USD Sports Center; San Diego, California
Dec 1, 1989*		vs. Bradley	W 86–60	3–0	Carver-Hawkeye Arena; Iowa City, Iowa
Dec 2, 1989*		at Iowa	L 79–85	3–1	Carver-Hawkeye Arena; Iowa City, Iowa
Dec 9, 1989*		at Loyola Marymount	L 101–104	3–2	Gersten Pavilion; Los Angeles, California
Dec 17, 1989*		Eastern Washington	W 72–67	4–2	The Thunderdome; Santa Barbara, California
Dec 19, 1989*		Oregon	W 70–54	5–2	The Thunderdome; Santa Barbara, California
Dec 23, 1989*		Boston University	W 89–68	6–2	The Thunderdome; Santa Barbara, California
Jan 2, 1990		San Jose State	W 82–61	7–2 (1–0)	The Thunderdome; Santa Barbara, California
Jan 4, 1990		Utah State	W 91–66	8–2 (2–0)	The Thunderdome; Santa Barbara, California
Jan 7, 1990		at Pacific	L 53–75	8–3 (2–1)	Alex G. Spanos Center; Stockton, California
Jan 9, 1990		at Fresno State	W 70–51	9–3 (3–1)	Selland Arena; Fresno, California
Jan 11, 1990		New Mexico State	L 61–74	9–4 (3–2)	The Thunderdome; Santa Barbara, California
Jan 13, 1990		Long Beach State	W 82–67	10–4 (4–2)	The Thunderdome; Santa Barbara, California
Jan 15, 1990		at Utah State	W 91–82	11–4 (5–2)	Dee Glen Smith Spectrum; Logan, Utah
Jan 20, 1990		at UC-Irvine	W 73–66	12–4 (6–2)	Bren Events Center; Irvine, California
Jan 25, 1990		at No. 5 UNLV	L 67–69	12–5 (6–3)	Thomas & Mack Center; Las Vegas, Nevada
Jan 29, 1990		Cal State Fullerton	W 72–64	13–5 (7–3)	The Thunderdome; Santa Barbara, California
Feb 1, 1990		Pacific	W 57–45	14–5 (8–3)	The Thunderdome; Santa Barbara, California
Feb 3, 1990		Fresno State	W 78–57	15–5 (9–3)	The Thunderdome; Santa Barbara, California
Feb 5, 1990*		at Santa Clara	W 82–63	16–5	Leavey Center; Santa Clara, California
Feb 8, 1990		at Long Beach State	W 84–67	17–5 (10–3)	The Gold Mine; Long Beach, California
Feb 10, 1990		at New Mexico State	L 64–66	17–6 (10–4)	Pan American Center; Las Cruces, New Mexico
Feb 15, 1990		at Cal State Fullerton	W 75–70	18–6 (11–4)	Titan Gym; Fullerton, California
Feb 17, 1990		UC Irvine	L 97–98	18–7 (11–5)	The Thunderdome; Santa Barbara, California
Feb 26, 1990		No. 4 UNLV	W 78–70	19–7 (12–5)	The Thunderdome (6,387); Santa Barbara, California
Mar 3, 1990		at San Jose State	W 77–76	20–7 (13–5)	The Event Center; San Jose, California
Big West tournament
Mar 8, 1990*		vs. Pacific; Big West tournament Quarterfinal	L 62–65	20–8	Long Beach Arena; Long Beach, California
NCAA tournament
Mar 15, 1990*	(9 SE)	vs. (8 SE) Houston; First Round	W 70–66	21–8	Thompson-Boling Arena; Knoxville, Tennessee
Mar 17, 1990*	(9 SE)	vs. (1 SE) No. 3 Michigan State; Second Round	L 58–62	21–9	Thompson-Boling Arena; Knoxville, Tennessee
*Non-conference game. ^{#}Rankings from AP Poll; Source. (#) Tournament seedings in parentheses. SE=Southeast. All times are in Pacific Time.
