= 1992 Big West Conference men's basketball tournament =

- Classification: Division I
- Season: 1991–92
- Teams: 8
- Site: Long Beach Arena; Long Beach, CA
- Champions: New Mexico State (1st title)
- Winning coach: Neil McCarthy (1st title)
- MVP: Sam Crawford (New Mexico State)

1991–92 Big West men's basketball standings
	Conf.				Overall
Team	W		L	PCT	W		L	PCT
No. 7 UNLV	18	–	0	1.000	26	–	2	.929
UC Santa Barbara	13	–	5	.722	20	–	9	.690
New Mexico State†	12	–	6	.667	25	–	8	.758
Long Beach State	11	–	7	.611	18	–	12	.600
Utah State	10	–	8	.556	16	–	12	.571
Pacific	8	–	10	.444	14	–	16	.467
Cal State Fullerton	8	–	10	.444	12	–	16	.429
Fresno State	6	–	12	.333	15	–	16	.484
UC Irvine	3	–	15	.167	7	–	22	.241
San Jose State	1	–	17	.056	2	–	24	.077
† 1992 Big West tournament winner Rankings from AP poll

The 1992 Big West Conference men's basketball tournament was held March 13–15 at the Long Beach Arena in Long Beach, California.

New Mexico State defeated Pacific in the final, 74–73, capturing their first Big West title. Three-time defending champions UNLV did not participate in this year's tournament due to NCAA sanctions.

The Aggies subsequently received an automatic bid to the 1992 NCAA tournament.

== Format ==
There were no changed to the tournament format for this season, with the Big West maintaining an eight-team tournament. In turn, only the top eight teams, based on regular season conference records, qualified for the tournament field.

UNLV, who finished first in the regular season standings, were barred from participating due to NCAA sanctions.

All eight teams were entered in the initial round, paired and seeded based on record.

== Bracket ==
First round Friday, March 13
1	UC Santa Barbara	67
8	UC Irvine	88
5	Pacific	86
4	Utah State	69
3	Long Beach State	77
6	Cal State Fullerton	71
7	Fresno State	85
2	New Mexico State	86

Semifinals; Saturday, March 14
8	UC Irvine	69
5	Pacific	81
3	Long Beach State	72
2	New Mexico State	80

Championship; Sunday, March 15
5	Pacific	73
2	New Mexico State	74
