= 1990–91 UC Irvine Anteaters men's basketball team =

American college basketball season

1990–91 UC Irvine Anteaters men's basketball
- Conference: Big West Conference
- Record: 11–19 (6–12 Big West)
- Head coach: Bill Mulligan (11th season)
- Home arena: Bren Events Center

1990–91 Big West men's basketball standings
	Conf.				Overall
Team	W		L	PCT	W		L	PCT
No. 1 UNLV	18	–	0	1.000	34	–	1	.971
No. 15 New Mexico State	15	–	3	.833	23	–	6	.793
Pacific	9	–	9	.500	14	–	15	.483
UC Santa Barbara	8	–	10	.444	14	–	15	.483
Utah State	8	–	10	.444	11	–	17	.393
Cal State Fullerton	7	–	11	.389	14	–	14	.500
Fresno State	7	–	11	.389	14	–	16	.467
Long Beach State	7	–	11	.389	11	–	17	.393
UC Irvine	6	–	12	.333	11	–	19	.367
San Jose State	5	–	13	.278	7	–	20	.259
† 1991 Big West tournament winner Rankings from AP poll

The 1990–91 UC Irvine Anteaters men's basketball team represented the University of California, Irvine during the 1990–91 NCAA Division I men's basketball season. The Anteaters were led by eleventh year head coach Bill Mulligan and played at the Bren Events Center. They were members of the Big West. They finished the season 11–19, 6–12 in Big West play. On February 14, 1991, Mulligan announced that he would resign as head coach at the end of the season.

== Previous season ==
The 1989–90 UC Irvine Anteaters men's basketball team finished the season with a record of 5–23, their worst in school history until that point, and 3–15 in Big West play.

== Roster ==
1990–91 UC Irvine Anteaters men's basketball team
Players
Coaches

Pos.	#	Name	Height	Weight	Year	Hometown
C		Cornelius Banks	6 ft 5 in (1.96 m)	—	So
C		Ricky Butler	6 ft 7 in (2.01 m)	—	Sr
F		Jeff Herdman	6 ft 7 in (2.01 m)	—	Sr
F		Gabe Higa	6 ft 5 in (1.96 m)	—	Fr
G		David Hollaway	6 ft 2 in (1.88 m)	—	Jr
F		Khari Johnson	6 ft 6 in (1.98 m)	—	Fr
F		Craig Marshall	6 ft 2 in (1.88 m)	—	So
C		Don May	6 ft 9 in (2.06 m)	—	Jr
G		Dylan Rigdon	6 ft 3 in (1.91 m)	—	So
F		Elgin Rogers	6 ft 6 in (1.98 m)	—	Jr
C		Rick Swanwick	6 ft 10 in (2.08 m)	—	Fr
F		Jeff Von Lutzow	6 ft 9 in (2.06 m)	—	So

Head coach

Bill Mulligan

Assistant coach(es)

Legend

- (C) Team captain
- (S) Suspended
- (I) Ineligible
- (W) Walk-on
- Injured
- Current redshirt

Roster
Last update: September 19, 2017

== Schedule ==
Date time, TV	Rank^{#}	Opponent^{#}	Result	Record	Site (attendance) city, state
Non-Conference Season
November 23, 1990*		vs. No. 11 UCLA; Great Alaska Shootout	L 101–134	0–1	Sullivan Arena (9,947); Anchorage, AK
November 24, 1990*		vs. Texas Tech; Great Alaska Shootout	W 96–81	1–1	Sullivan Arena (5,443); Anchorage, AK
November 25, 1990*		vs. Siena; Great Alaska Shootout	L 108–119	1–2	Sullivan Arena (2,300); Anchorage, AK
November 30, 1990*		Idaho State; Disneyland Freedom Bowl Classic	W 96–82	2–2	Bren Events Center (2,368); Irvine, CA
December 1, 1990*		Bradley; Disneyland Freedom Bowl Classic	W 94–85	3–2	Bren Events Center (2,571); Irvine, CA
December 8, 1990*		Utah	L 80–97	3–3	Bren Events Center (1,246); Irvine, CA
December 11, 1990*		at Maryland	L 79–93	3–4	Cole Field House (7,263); College Park, MD
December 15, 1990*		at San Diego State	L 73–87	3–5	Peterson Gym (1,384); San Diego, CA
December 19, 1990*		at Stanford	L 87–117	3–6	Maples Pavilion (2,250); Stanford, CA
December 22, 1990*		California	W 98–88	4–6	Bren Events Center (3,126); Irvine, CA
December 28, 1990*		vs. Alabama State; Dr. Pepper Classic	W 102–98	5–6	UTC Arena (4,825); Chattanooga, TN
December 29, 1990*		at Chattanooga; Dr. Pepper Classic	L 68–88	5–7	UTC Arena (5,129); Chattanooga, TN
Conference Season
January 2, 1991		at Utah State	L 88–111	5–8 (0–1)	Smith Spectrum (6,314); Logan, UT
January 4, 1991		at San Jose	W 97–88	6–8 (1–1)	Event Center Arena (1,542); San Jose, CA
January 7, 1991		Pacific	L 87–108	6–9 (1–2)	Bren Events Center (1,907); Irvine, CA
January 9, 1991		Fresno State	W 105–82	7–9 (2–2)	Bren Events Center (2,158); Irvine, CA
January 11, 1991		at Long Beach State	L 63–66	7–10 (2–3)	Gold Mine (1,779); Long Beach, CA
January 17, 1991		No. 1 UNLV	L 76–117	7–11 (2–4)	Bren Events Center (5,005); Irvine, CA
January 19, 1991		at UC Santa Barbara	L 81–83	7–12 (2–5)	UC Santa Barbara Events Center (5,378); Santa Barbara, CA
January 21, 1991		at No. 21 New Mexico State	L 60–77	7–13 (2–6)	Pan American Center (9,148); Las Cruces, NM
January 26, 1991		Cal State Fullerton	W 92–87	8–13 (3–6)	Bren Events Center (2,267); Irvine, CA
January 31, 1991		at Fresno State	L 75–88	8–14 (3–7)	Selland Arena (9,714); Fresno, CA
February 2, 1991		at Pacific	L 65–75	8–15 (3–8)	Alex G. Spanos Center (2,871); Stockton, CA
February 7, 1991		Long Beach State	L 60–72	8–16 (3–9)	Bren Events Center (1,412); Irvine, CA
February 9, 1991		No. 16 New Mexico State	L 65–73	8–17 (3–10)	Bren Events Center (2,552); Irvine, CA
February 16, 1991		UC Santa Barbara	L 60–69	8–18 (3–11)	Bren Events Center (2,816); Irvine, CA
February 21, 1991		Cal State Fullerton	W 96–92	9–18 (4–11)	Titan Gym (2,021); Fullerton, CA
February 23, 1991		at No. 1 UNLV	L 86–114	9–19 (4–12)	Thomas & Mack Center (19,826); Paradise, NV
February 28, 1991		San Jose State	W 86–81 ^{OT}	10–19 (5–12)	Bren Events Center (1,123); Irvine, CA
March 2, 1991		Utah State	W 109–107	11–19 (6–12)	Bren Events Center (2,261); Irvine, CA
*Non-conference game. ^{#}Rankings from AP Poll. (#) Tournament seedings in parentheses. All times are in Pacific Time.
