= 1989–90 UNLV Runnin' Rebels basketball team =

American college basketball season

1989–90 UNLV Runnin' Rebels basketball

NCAA tournament National Champions Big West tournament champions Big West regular season co-champions

National Championship Game, W 103–73 vs. Duke
- Conference: Big West Conference

Ranking
- Coaches: No. 2
- AP: No. 2
- Record: 35–5 (16–2 Big West)
- Head coach: Jerry Tarkanian (17th season)
- Assistant coaches: Tim Grgurich (9th season); Ron Ganulin (2nd season); Cleveland Edwards (6th season)
- Home arena: Thomas & Mack Center

1989–90 Big West men's basketball standings
	Conf.				Overall
Team	W		L	PCT	W		L	PCT
No. 24 New Mexico State	16	–	2	.889	26	–	5	.839
No. 2 UNLV†	16	–	2	.889	35	–	5	.875
UC Santa Barbara	13	–	5	.722	21	–	9	.700
Long Beach State	12	–	6	.667	23	–	9	.719
Utah State	8	–	10	.444	14	–	16	.467
Pacific	7	–	11	.389	15	–	14	.517
Cal State Fullerton	6	–	12	.333	13	–	16	.448
San Jose State	5	–	13	.278	8	–	20	.286
Fresno State	4	–	14	.222	10	–	19	.345
UC Irvine	3	–	15	.167	5	–	23	.179
† 1990 Big West tournament winner Rankings from AP poll

The 1989–90 UNLV Runnin' Rebels basketball team represented the University of Nevada, Las Vegas in the 1989–90 NCAA Division I men's basketball season. They were led by 17th-year head coach Jerry Tarkanian. The team played its home games in the Thomas & Mack Center as a member of the Big West Conference. They finished the season 35–5, 16–2 in Big West play to win the regular season championship. They defeated Cal State Fullerton, Pacific, and Long Beach State to win the Big West tournament championship. As a result, the received the conference's automatic bid to the NCAA tournament as the No. 1 seed in the West region. They defeated Arkansas–Little Rock, Ohio State, Ball State, and Loyola Marymount to advance to the school's second Final Four in 4 years. In the Final Four, they defeated Georgia Tech to advance to the championship game where they defeated Duke for the school's only national championship.

== Previous season ==
The Rebels finished the 1988–89 season 25–8, 16–2 in Big West play to win the regular season championship. They defeated UC Irvine, Cal State Fullerton, and New Mexico State to win the Big West tournament championship. As a result, they received the conference's automatic bid to the NCAA tournament as the No. 4 seed in the West region. They defeated Idaho, DePaul, and No. 1-seeded Arizona to advance to the Elite Eight where they lost to Seton Hall.

== Season summary ==
=== NCAA tournament ===
UNLV won three of its tournament games by 30 points, but got a scare from Ball State in the regional semifinal, winning by just two points.

In the 1990 Tournament -

- UNLV at the time had the largest accumulated victory margin (112 points), over the entire tournament by a championship team that played six games. They held the record for six years. To date it is the seventh-largest.
- UNLV's 103–73 win over Duke marked the first, (and to date, only), time in the history of the tournament that at least 100 points were scored in the championship game.
- UNLV's 571 points over six games set the record for most points scored by a single team in any one year of the tournament.
- UNLV is the only team in tournament history to average more than 95 points per game, over six games. In six tournament games, they won three by exactly 30 points, while scoring more than 100 points in each 30-point victory.
- UNLV and UCLA in 1965 are the only championship teams in tournament history to win three games all while scoring at least 100 points in each win. (Loyola Marymount also scored at least 100 points in three games in the 1990 tournament, but lost their last game, where they scored 101 points, to UNLV, by 30 points. UNLV also scored at least 100 points in three victories in the 1977 tournament, but their last one was in the Final Four consolation game.)
- UNLV's 30-point margin of victory in the championship game is also a tournament record. ESPN called it the 36th "worst blowout in sports history".
- To date, UNLV remains the last team from a non-power conference (AAC, ACC, Big East, Big Ten, Big 12, Pac-12, and SEC) to win the national championship, since Louisville in 1986. (Louisville was in The Metro Conference in 1986, which was considered a major, but not “power” basketball conference throughout the conference’s history, 1975 - 1995.)
- The championship game was UNLV's eleventh-consecutive win. They would eventually run the win streak to an astounding 45 games. That is the fourth-longest win streak in NCAA Division 1 basketball history, and the longest win streak since the longest one ever (by UCLA) ended in 1974.

(The nickname "Runnin' Rebels" is unique to men's basketball at UNLV. The default nickname for men's sports teams at the school is simply "Rebels", while all women's teams are known as "Lady Rebels".)

== Roster ==
1989–90 UNLV Runnin' Rebels men's basketball team
Players
Coaches

Pos.	#	Name	Height	Weight	Year	Hometown
C	00	David Butler	6 ft 10 in (2.08 m)	200 lb (91 kg)	Sr	Washington, D.C.
F	4	Larry Johnson	6 ft 7 in (2.01 m)	250 lb (113 kg)	Jr	Dallas, Texas
G	5	Stacey Cvijanovich	6 ft 3 in (1.91 m)	200 lb (91 kg)	Sr	Oxnard, California
G	12	Anderson Hunt	6 ft 2 in (1.88 m)	176 lb (80 kg)	So	Detroit, Michigan
G	13	Travis Bice	6 ft 4 in (1.93 m)	152 lb (69 kg)	So	Simi Valley, California
G	15	Bryan Emerzian	5 ft 11 in (1.8 m)	165 lb (75 kg)	So	Waukegan, Illinois
G	30	Dave Rice	6 ft 5 in (1.96 m)	205 lb (93 kg)	Jr	Claremont, California
F	32	Stacey Augmon	6 ft 8 in (2.03 m)	206 lb (93 kg)	Jr	Pasadena, California
F	33	Barry Young	6 ft 7 in (2.01 m)	223 lb (101 kg)	Jr	Ellicott City, Maryland
C	34	James Jones	6 ft 9 in (2.06 m)	220 lb (100 kg)	Sr	Cincinnati, Ohio
F	35	Moses Scurry	6 ft 7 in (2.01 m)	220 lb (100 kg)	Sr	Brooklyn, New York
F/C	44	George Ackles (injured)	6 ft 9 in (2.06 m)	210 lb (95 kg)		Pittsburgh, Pennsylvania
G	50	Greg Anthony	6 ft 2 in (1.88 m)	190 lb (86 kg)	Jr	Las Vegas, Nevada
F	53	Chris Jeter	6 ft 8 in (2.03 m)	216 lb (98 kg)	Jr	San Diego, California

Head coach

- Jerry Tarkanian (Fresno State)

Assistant coach(es)

- Tim Grgurich
- Ron Ganulin
- Cleveland Edwards

Legend

- (C) Team captain
- (S) Suspended
- (I) Ineligible
- (W) Walk-on
- Injured
- Current redshirt

1989-90 UNLV Roster and StatsRebel-Net.com - Best of the 64 Era: The 1990 Runnin' Rebels

== Schedule and results ==
Date time, TV	Rank^{#}	Opponent^{#}	Result	Record	High points	High rebounds	High assists	Site (attendance) city, state
Regular Season
November 15, 1989*	No. 1	Loyola Marymount; Preseason NIT	W 102–91	1–0	26 – Hunt	16 – Johnson	12 – Anthony	Thomas & Mack Center (13,430); Las Vegas, NV
November 16, 1989*	No. 1	California; Preseason NIT	W 101–81	2–0	25 – Johnson	10 – Johnson	11 – Anthony	Thomas & Mack Center (11,777); Las Vegas, NV
November 22, 1989*	No. 1	vs. Kansas; Preseason NIT Semifinal	L 77–91	2–1	21 – Hunt	9 – Tied	9 – Anthony	Madison Square Garden (10,546); New York, NY
November 24, 1989*	No. 1	vs. DePaul; Preseason NIT Consolation	W 88–53	3–1	32 – Johnson	9 – Augmon	7 – Augmon	Madison Square Garden (15,116); New York, NY
December 9, 1989*	No. 5	at No. 12 Oklahoma	L 81–89	3–2	29 – Johnson	14 – Johnson	4 – Tied	Lloyd Noble Center (11,700); Norman, OK
December 16, 1989	No. 14	at Pacific	W 79–65	4–2 (1–0)	21 – Johnson	10 – Johnson	9 – Anthony	Alex G. Spanos Center (6,000); Stockton, CA
December 23, 1989*	No. 13	No. 16 Iowa	W 97–80	5–2	19 – Tied	8 – Johnson	7 – Hunt	Thomas & Mack Center (19,000); Las Vegas, NV
December 26, 1989	No. 12	Long Beach State	W 78–58	6–2 (2–0)	17 – Johnson	14 – Johnson	8 – Anthony	Thomas & Mack Center (18,600); Las Vegas, NV
January 1, 1990*	No. 12	No. 11 Arkansas	W 101–93	7–2	28 – Hunt	13 – Butler	11 – Anthony	Thomas & Mack Center (18,853); Las Vegas, NV
January 3, 1990	No. 10	Cal State Fullerton	W 94–66	8–2 (3–0)	28 – Hunt	10 – Tied	9 – Anthony	Thomas & Mack Center (19,010); Las Vegas, NV
January 6, 1990	No. 10	at San Jose State	W 100–80	9–2 (4–0)	19 – Butler	15 – Johnson	5 – Anthony	Event Center Arena (4,595); San Jose, CA
January 8, 1990	No. 10	at New Mexico State	L 82–83	9–3 (4–1)	24 – Butler	11 – Butler	9 – Anthony	Pan American Center (12,719); Las Cruces, NM
January 13, 1990*	No. 7	at Temple	W 82–76	10–3	26 – Johnson	12 – Johnson	7 – Augmon	The Spectrum (13,206); Philadelphia, PA
January 15, 1990	No. 7	at Fresno State	W 84–75	11–3 (5–1)	28 – Johnson	13 – Butler	6 – Butler	Selland Arena (10,159); Fresno, CA
January 18, 1990	No. 9	UC Irvine	W 103–67	12–3 (6–1)	20 – Johnson	9 – Johnson	8 – Anthony	Thomas & Mack Center (18,632); Las Vegas, NV
January 22, 1990	No. 9	at Long Beach State	W 86–77	13–3 (7–1)	30 – Johnson	12 – Johnson	5 – Tied	Long Beach Arena (7,438); Long Beach, CA
January 25, 1990	No. 5	UC Santa Barbara	W 69–67	14–3 (8–1)	28 – Johnson	14 – Johnson	4 – Tied	Thomas & Mack Center (19,061); Las Vegas, NV
January 28, 1990*	No. 5	at No. 16 LSU	L 105–107	14–4	31 – Hunt	9 – Tied	8 – Anthony	Maravich Assembly Center (14,072); Baton Rouge, LA
February 1, 1990	No. 12	Utah State	W 124–90	15–4 (9–1)	34 – Augmon	16 – Johnson	9 – Anthony	Thomas & Mack Center (18,000); Las Vegas, NV
February 3, 1990*	No. 12	NC State	W 88–82	16–4	24 – Johnson	16 – Johnson	7 – Anthony	Thomas & Mack Center (18,295); Las Vegas, NV
February 5, 1990*	No. 12	San Jose State	W 105–69	17–4 (10–1)	18 – Johnson	16 – Johnson	9 – Anthony	Thomas & Mack Center (17,666); Las Vegas, NV
February 8, 1990	No. 9	Pacific	W 116–76	18–4 (11–1)	20 – Young	8 – Butler	7 – Cvijanovich	Thomas & Mack Center (17,685); Las Vegas, NV
February 10, 1990*	No. 9	Oklahoma State	W 100–84	19–4	23 – Scurry	15 – Johnson	10 – Anthony	Thomas & Mack Center (18,780); Las Vegas, NV
February 12, 1990	No. 9	Fresno State	W 69–64	20–4 (12–1)	23 – Johnson	14 – Johnson	6 – Hunt	Thomas & Mack Center (17,885); Las Vegas, NV
February 15, 1990	No. 7	No. 25 New Mexico State	W 109–86	21–4 (13–1)	31 – Hunt	13 – Johnson	6 – Anthony	Thomas & Mack Center (18,790); Las Vegas, NV
February 18, 1990*	No. 7	No. 20 Arizona	W 95–87	22–4	26 – Johnson	12 – Augmon	7 – Anthony	Thomas & Mack Center (19,034); Las Vegas, NV
February 22, 1990	No. 4	at UC Irvine	W 99–77	23–4 (14–1)	25 – Hunt	11 – Johnson	10 – Anthony	Bren Events Center (5,000); Irvine, CA
February 24, 1990*	No. 4	No. 16 Louisville	W 91–81	24–4	22 – Johnson	15 – Johnson	9 – Anthony	Thomas & Mack Center (19,099); Las Vegas, NV
February 26, 1990	No. 4	at UC Santa Barbara	L 70–78	24–5 (14–2)	18 – Anthony	9 – Butler	6 – Anthony	The Thunderdome (6,387); Santa Barbara, CA
March 1, 1990	No. 2	at Utah State	W 84–82	25–5 (15–2)	31 – Johnson	12 – Butler	7 – Tied	Smith Spectrum (10,270); Logan, UT
March 3, 1990	No. 2	at Cal State Fullerton	W 103–85	26–5 (16–2)	26 – Butler	12 – Johnson	10 – Hunt	Titan Gym (4,003); Fullerton, CA
Big West tournament
March 8, 1990*	(2) No. 3	(7) Cal State Fullerton; Quarterfinals	W 115–93	27–5	32 – Johnson	14 – Johnson	11 – Anthony	Long Beach Arena (9,025); Long Beach, CA
March 9, 1990*	(2) No. 3	(6) Pacific; Semifinals	W 99–72	28–5	20 – Johnson	9 – Augmon	10 – Anthony	Long Beach Arena (10,597); Long Beach, CA
March 10, 1990*	(2) No. 3	(5) Long Beach State; Championship	W 92–74	29–5	19 – Butler	15 – Johnson	7 – Anthony	Long Beach Arena (9,607); Long Beach, CA
NCAA Tournament
March 15, 1990*; CBS	(1 W) No. 2	vs. (16 W) Arkansas–Little Rock; First Round	W 102–72	30–5	16 – Augmon	12 – Johnson	5 – Tied	Jon M. Huntsman Center (11,809); Salt Lake City, UT
March 17, 1990*; CBS	(1 W) No. 2	vs. (8 W) Ohio State; Second Round	W 76–65	31–5	23 – Johnson	16 – Johnson	5 – Anthony	Jon M. Huntsman Center (12,896); Salt Lake City, UT
March 23, 1990*; CBS	(1 W) No. 2	vs. (12 W) Ball State; Sweet Sixteen	W 69–67	32–5	20 – Tied	13 – Johnson	9 – Anthony	Oakland–Alameda County Coliseum Arena (14,262); Oakland, CA
March 25, 1990*; CBS	(1 W) No. 2	vs. (11 W) No. 21 Loyola Marymount; Elite Eight	W 131–101	33–5	33 – Augmon	18 – Johnson	13 – Hunt	Oakland–Alameda County Coliseum Arena (14,298); Oakland, CA
March 31, 1990*; CBS	(1 W) No. 2	vs. (4 SE) No. 9 Georgia Tech; Final Four	W 90–81	34–5	22 – Augmon	10 – Butler	7 – Hunt	McNichols Sports Arena (17,675); Denver, CO
April 2, 1990*; CBS	(1 W) No. 2	vs. (3 E) No. 9 Duke; National Championship	W 103–73	35–5	29 – Hunt	11 – Johnson	7 – Augmon	McNichols Sports Arena (17,675); Denver, CO
*Non-conference game. ^{#}Rankings from AP Poll. (#) Tournament seedings in parentheses.

Sources Rebel-Net.com - Best of the 64 Era: The 1990 Runnin' Rebels1989-90 UNLV Schedule and Results

== Awards and honors ==
- Anderson Hunt, NCAA Men's MOP Award
- Larry Johnson, Consensus First-team All-American and Big West Conference Player of the Year
- Stacey Augmon – NABC Defensive Player of the Year (2)

== Team players drafted into the NBA ==
Year	Round	Pick	Player	NBA club
1991	1	1	Larry Johnson	Charlotte Hornets
1991	1	9	Stacey Augmon	Atlanta Hawks
1991	1	12	Greg Anthony	New York Knicks
1991	2	29	George Ackles	Miami Heat
