= 1989–90 New Mexico State Aggies basketball team =

American college basketball season

1989–90 New Mexico State Aggies men's basketball

Big West regular season co-champions

NCAA tournament, first round
- Conference: Big West Conference

Ranking
- Coaches: No. 20
- AP: No. 24
- Record: 26–5 (16–2 Big West)
- Head coach: Neil McCarthy (5th season)
- Home arena: Pan American Center

1989–90 Big West men's basketball standings
	Conf.				Overall
Team	W		L	PCT	W		L	PCT
No. 24 New Mexico State	16	–	2	.889	26	–	5	.839
No. 2 UNLV†	16	–	2	.889	35	–	5	.875
UC Santa Barbara	13	–	5	.722	21	–	9	.700
Long Beach State	12	–	6	.667	23	–	9	.719
Utah State	8	–	10	.444	14	–	16	.467
Pacific	7	–	11	.389	15	–	14	.517
Cal State Fullerton	6	–	12	.333	13	–	16	.448
San Jose State	5	–	13	.278	8	–	20	.286
Fresno State	4	–	14	.222	10	–	19	.345
UC Irvine	3	–	15	.167	5	–	23	.179
† 1990 Big West tournament winner Rankings from AP poll

The 1989–90 New Mexico State Aggies men's basketball team represented New Mexico State University in the 1989–90 college basketball season. This was Neil McCarthy's 5th season as head coach. The Aggies played their home games at Pan American Center and competed in the Big West Conference. They finished the season 26–5, 16–2 in Big West play to earn a share of the conference regular season title. They earned an at-large bid to the NCAA tournament, but fell in the first round to Loyola Marymount, 111–92.

== Roster ==
1989–90 New Mexico State Aggies men's basketball team
Players
Coaches

Pos.	#	Name	Height	Weight	Year	Hometown
G	3	Randy Brown	6 ft 2 in (1.88 m)	185 lb (84 kg)	Jr	Chicago, Illinois
G	23	Reggie Jordan	6 ft 4 in (1.93 m)	190 lb (86 kg)	Jr	Chicago, Illinois

Head coach

- Neil McCarthy (Sacramento State)

Assistant coach(es)

Legend

- (C) Team captain
- (S) Suspended
- (I) Ineligible
- (W) Walk-on
- Injured
- Current redshirt

== Schedule and results ==
Date time, TV	Rank^{#}	Opponent^{#}	Result	Record	Site (attendance) city, state
Regular season
Nov 20, 1989*		Simon Fraser	W 91–53	1–0	Pan American Center (4,792); Las Cruces, New Mexico
Nov 24, 1989*		Eastern New Mexico	W 85–65	2–0	Pan American Center (3,831); Las Cruces, New Mexico
Nov 27, 1989*		at UTEP	L 72–75	2–1	Special Events Center (12,222); El Paso, Texas
Dec 2, 1989*		New Mexico	W 60–55	3–1	Pan American Center (13,040); Las Cruces, New Mexico
Dec 4, 1989*		Delaware State	W 104–90	4–1	Pan American Center (6,069); Las Cruces, New Mexico
Dec 7, 1989*		at New Mexico	W 74–73	5–1	The Pit (18,100); Albuquerque, New Mexico
Dec 12, 1989*		UTEP	W 62–49	6–1	Pan American Center (12,739); Las Cruces, New Mexico
Dec 18, 1989*		at Texas Tech	W 74–68	7–1	Lubbock Municipal Coliseum (2,078); Lubbock, Texas
Dec 21, 1989*		Sam Houston State	W 84–66	8–1	Pan American Center (8,143); Las Cruces, New Mexico
Dec 28, 1989*		Texas Southern	W 97–76	9–1	Pan American Center (7,941); Las Cruces, New Mexico
Jan 2, 1990		Fresno State	W 71–69	10–1 (1–0)	Pan American Center (7,529); Las Cruces, New Mexico
Jan 4, 1990		Pacific	W 81–60	11–1 (2–0)	Pan American Center (9,104); Las Cruces, New Mexico
Jan 8, 1990		No. 10 UNLV	W 83–82	12–1 (3–0)	Pan American Center (12,719); Las Cruces, New Mexico
Jan 11, 1990		at UC Santa Barbara	W 74–61	13–1 (4–0)	The Thunderdome (6,000); Santa Barbara, California
Jan 13, 1990		at UC Irvine	W 88–75	14–1 (5–0)	Bren Events Center (2,248); Irvine, California
Jan 15, 1990		at Long Beach State	L 56–72	14–2 (5–1)	The Gold Mine (1,998); Long Beach, California
Jan 20, 1990		Cal State Fullerton	W 75–58	15–2 (6–1)	Pan American Center (11,791); Las Cruces, New Mexico
Jan 25, 1990		at San Jose State	W 80–76	16–2 (7–1)	The Event Center (3,054); San Jose, California
Jan 27, 1990		at Utah State	W 81–73	17–2 (8–1)	Dee Glen Smith Spectrum (7,920); Logan, Utah
Feb 3, 1990		Long Beach State	W 104–91	18–2 (9–1)	Pan American Center (12,599); Las Cruces, New Mexico
Feb 8, 1990		UC Irvine	W 79–75	19–2 (10–1)	Pan American Center (9,484); Las Cruces, New Mexico
Feb 10, 1990		UC Santa Barbara	W 66–64	20–2 (11–1)	Pan American Center (11,918); Las Cruces, New Mexico
Feb 15, 1990	No. 25	at No. 7 UNLV	L 86–109	20–3 (11–2)	Thomas & Mack Center (18,790); Las Vegas, Nevada
Feb 17, 1990	No. 25	at Cal State Fullerton	W 65–62	21–3 (12–2)	Titan Gym (2,717); Fullerton, California
Feb 22, 1990	No. 24	Utah State	W 103–84	22–3 (13–2)	Pan American Center (10,610); Las Cruces, New Mexico
Feb 24, 1990	No. 24	San Jose State	W 101–70	23–3 (14–2)	Pan American Center (13,182); Las Cruces, New Mexico
Mar 1, 1990	No. 24	at Pacific	W 68–55	24–3 (15–2)	Alex G. Spanos Center (3,206); Stockton, California
Mar 3, 1990	No. 24	at Fresno State	W 82–68	25–3 (16–2)	Selland Arena (10,096); Fresno, California
Big West tournament
Mar 8, 1990*	No. 23	vs. Fresno State; Big West tournament Quarterfinal	W 72–66	26–3	Long Beach Arena (9,025); Long Beach, California
Mar 9, 1990*	No. 23	at Long Beach State; Big West tournament Semifinal	L 85–90	26–4	Long Beach Arena (10,597); Long Beach, California
NCAA tournament
Mar 16, 1990*	(6 W) No. 24	vs. (11 W) No. 21 Loyola Marymount; First Round	L 92–111	26–5	Long Beach Arena (12,200); Long Beach, California
*Non-conference game. ^{#}Rankings from AP Poll. (#) Tournament seedings in parentheses. W=West. All times are in Mountain Time.
