= Charles Ridl =

American basketball coach

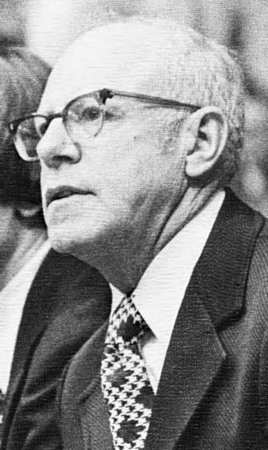
Charles "Buzz" Ridl coaching Pitt in 1974

Charles G. "Buzz" Ridl (June 27, 1920 – April 28, 1995) was an American college head coach of men's basketball born in the Pittsburgh suburb of Irwin, Pennsylvania.

He was the long-time coach at Westminster College in Pennsylvania, until 1968 when he was tapped for Division I by the Pittsburgh Panthers. He resurrected a failing program after former coach Timmons lost control of his once competitive team in the midst of the late 1960s protest culture. Along with defensive coordinator Fran Webster and assistant Tim Grgurich, Ridl developed the often duplicated "Amoeba defense" and shocked the basketball world with it in 1973-1974 with a school record 22 straight wins and an Elite Eight appearance. He was inducted into the NAIA Hall of Fame (1969), Western Pennsylvania Coaches Hall of Fame (1980), and the Pennsylvania Sports Hall of Fame (1992).

Ridl's win–loss record at Pitt was 97-83 (.539).
