= 1989–90 UC Irvine Anteaters men's basketball team =

American college basketball season

1989–90 UC Irvine Anteaters men's basketball
- Conference: Big West Conference
- Record: 5–23 (3–13 Big West)
- Head coach: Bill Mulligan (10th season)
- Home arena: Bren Events Center

1989–90 Big West men's basketball standings
	Conf.				Overall
Team	W		L	PCT	W		L	PCT
No. 24 New Mexico State	16	–	2	.889	26	–	5	.839
No. 2 UNLV†	16	–	2	.889	35	–	5	.875
UC Santa Barbara	13	–	5	.722	21	–	9	.700
Long Beach State	12	–	6	.667	23	–	9	.719
Utah State	8	–	10	.444	14	–	16	.467
Pacific	7	–	11	.389	15	–	14	.517
Cal State Fullerton	6	–	12	.333	13	–	16	.448
San Jose State	5	–	13	.278	8	–	20	.286
Fresno State	4	–	14	.222	10	–	19	.345
UC Irvine	3	–	15	.167	5	–	23	.179
† 1990 Big West tournament winner Rankings from AP poll

The 1989–90 UC Irvine Anteaters men's basketball team represented the University of California, Irvine during the 1989-90 NCAA Division I men's basketball season. The Anteaters were led by tenth year head coach Bill Mulligan and played their home games at the Bren Events Center. They were members of the Big West Conference. They finished the season 5–23 and 3–13 in Big West play. They advanced to the Big West Conference tournament where they lost to the Cal State Fullerton Titans.

== Previous season ==
The 1988–89 UC Irvine Anteaters men's basketball team finished the season 12–17 and 8th in Big West play with a conference record of 8–10.

== Roster ==
1989–90 UC Irvine Anteaters men's basketball team
Players
Coaches

Pos.	#	Name	Height	Weight	Year	Hometown
F		Justin Anderson	6 ft 5 in (1.96 m)	—	Jr
C		Ricky Butler	6 ft 7 in (2.01 m)	—	Jr
F	22	Rob Doktorczyk	6 ft 9 in (2.06 m)	175 lb (79 kg)	Sr	San Pedro, CA
G		Mike Foster	6 ft 2 in (1.88 m)	—	Fr
F		Jeff Herdman	6 ft 7 in (2.01 m)	—	Jr
G		Craig Marshall	6 ft 2 in (1.88 m)	—	Fr
C		Don May	6 ft 9 in (2.06 m)	—	So
G		Rod Palmer	6 ft 3 in (1.91 m)	—	Sr
G		Dylan Rigdon	6 ft 3 in (1.91 m)	—	Fr
G		Ben Rishwain	5 ft 10 in (1.78 m)	—	Fr
F		Elgin Rogers	6 ft 6 in (1.98 m)	—	So
G		Etop Udo-Ema	6 ft 4 in (1.93 m)	—	So
F		Jeff Von Lutzow	6 ft 9 in (2.06 m)	—	Fr

Head coach

Bill Mulligan

Assistant coach(es)

Legend

- (C) Team captain
- (S) Suspended
- (I) Ineligible
- (W) Walk-on
- Injured
- Current redshirt

Roster
Last update: September 21, 2017

=== Schedule ===
Date time, TV	Rank^{#}	Opponent^{#}	Result	Record	Site (attendance) city, state
Non-Conference Season
November 25, 1989*		at San Francisco	L 71–79	0–1	War Memorial Gymnasium (1,622); San Francisco, CA
November 27, 1989*		Stanford	L 57–70	0–2	Bren Events Center (2,986); Irvine, CA
December 1, 1989*		Bucknell; Disneyland Freedom Bowl Classic	W 85–79	1–2	Bren Events Center (2,062); Irvine, CA
December 2, 1989*		Chattanooga; Disneyland Freedom Bowl Classic	L 72–74	1–3	Bren Events Center (2,281); Irvine, CA
December 9, 1989*		at California	L 78–99	1–4	Haas Pavilion (6,578); Berkeley, CA
December 13, 1989*		at Colorado	L 83–98	1–5	CU Events/Conference Center (2,234); Boulder, CO
December 16, 1989*		San Diego State	W 75–62	2–5	Bren Events Center (2,130); Irvine, CA
December 19, 1989*		at Pepperdine	L 71–81	2–6	Firestone Fieldhouse (1,257); Malibu, CA
December 21, 1989*		Loyola–Chicago	L 72–78 ^{OT}	2–7	Bren Events Center (1,437); Irvine, CA
Conference Season
January 2, 1990		Utah State	L 70–80	2–8 (0–1)	Bren Events Center (1,686); Irvine, CA
January 4, 1990		San Jose State	L 69–75	2–9 (0–2)	Bren Events Center (2,017); Irvine, CA
January 7, 1990		at Fresno State	L 57–67	2–10 (0–3)	Selland Arena (9,796); Fresno, CA
January 9, 1990		at Pacific	L 58–70	2–11 (0–4)	Alex G. Spanos Center (2,552); Stockton, CA
January 11, 1990		Long Beach State	L 48–49	2–12 (0–5)	Bren Events Center (3,023); Irvine, CA
January 13, 1990		New Mexico State	L 75–88	2–13 (0–6)	Bren Events Center (2,248); Irvine, CA
January 18, 1990		at No. 9 UNLV	L 67–103	2–14 (0–7)	Thomas & Mack Center (18,632); Paradise, NV
January 20, 1990		UC Santa Barbara	L 66–73	2–15 (0–8)	Bren Events Center (2,368); Irvine, CA
January 25, 1990		at Cal State Fullerton	L 55–82	2–16 (0–9)	Titan Gym (3,126); Fullerton, CA
February 1, 1990		Fresno State	L 75–78	2–17 (0–10)	Bren Events Center (1,440); Irvine, CA
February 3, 1990		Pacific	L 75–76	2–18 (0–11)	Bren Events Center (1,823); Irvine, CA
February 8, 1990		at New Mexico State	L 75–79	2–19 (0–12)	Pan American Center (9,484); Las Cruces, NM
February 15, 1990		at Long Beach State	L 63–102	2–20 (0–13)	Gold Mine (1,649); Long Beach, CA
February 17, 1990		at UC Santa Barbara	W 98–97	3–20 (1–13)	UC Santa Barbara Events Center (5,395); Santa Barbara, CA
February 22, 1990		No. 4 UNLV	L 77–99	3–21 (1–14)	Bren Events Center (5,000); Irvine, CA
February 24, 1990		Cal State Fullerton	W 94–76	4–21 (2–14)	Bren Events Center (2,412); Irvine, CA
March 1, 1990		at San Jose State	L 78–84	4–22 (2–15)	Event Center Arena (1,686); San Jose, CA
March 3, 1990		at Utah State	W 80–76	5–22 (3–15)	Smith Spectrum (7,016); Logan, UT
Big West Conference tournament
March 7, 1990		vs. Cal State Fullerton; First Round	L 63–82	5–23	Long Beach Arena (1,312); Long Beach, CA
*Non-conference game. ^{#}Rankings from AP Poll. (#) Tournament seedings in parentheses. All times are in Pacific Time.

== Awards and honors ==
- Dylan Rigdon
  - Big West Freshman All-Conference
- Jeff Von Lutzow
  - Big West Freshman All-Conference
