= 1990–91 New Mexico State Aggies basketball team =

American college basketball season

1990–91 New Mexico State Aggies men's basketball

NCAA tournament
- Conference: Big West Conference

Ranking
- Coaches: No. 17
- AP: No. 15
- Record: 23–6 (15–3 Big West)
- Head coach: Neil McCarthy (6th season)
- Home arena: Pan American Center

1990–91 Big West men's basketball standings
	Conf.				Overall
Team	W		L	PCT	W		L	PCT
No. 1 UNLV	18	–	0	1.000	34	–	1	.971
No. 15 New Mexico State	15	–	3	.833	23	–	6	.793
Pacific	9	–	9	.500	14	–	15	.483
UC Santa Barbara	8	–	10	.444	14	–	15	.483
Utah State	8	–	10	.444	11	–	17	.393
Cal State Fullerton	7	–	11	.389	14	–	14	.500
Fresno State	7	–	11	.389	14	–	16	.467
Long Beach State	7	–	11	.389	11	–	17	.393
UC Irvine	6	–	12	.333	11	–	19	.367
San Jose State	5	–	13	.278	7	–	20	.259
† 1991 Big West tournament winner Rankings from AP poll

The 1990–91 New Mexico State Aggies men's basketball team represented New Mexico State University in the 1990–91 college basketball season. This was Neil McCarthy's 6th season as head coach. The Aggies played their home games at Pan American Center and competed in the Big West Conference. They finished the season 23–6, 15–3 in Big West play to earn a second-place finish in the conference regular season standings. They earned an at-large bid to the NCAA tournament as No. 6 seed in the West region, but fell in the first round to No. 11 seed Creighton, 64–56.

== Roster ==
1990–91 New Mexico State Aggies men's basketball team
Players
Coaches

Pos.	#	Name	Height	Weight	Year	Hometown
G	3	Randy Brown	6 ft 2 in (1.88 m)	185 lb (84 kg)	Sr	Chicago, Illinois
G	23	Reggie Jordan	6 ft 4 in (1.93 m)	190 lb (86 kg)	Sr	Chicago, Illinois

Head coach

- Neil McCarthy (Sacramento State)

Assistant coach(es)

Legend

- (C) Team captain
- (S) Suspended
- (I) Ineligible
- (W) Walk-on
- Injured
- Current redshirt

== Schedule and results ==
Date time, TV	Rank^{#}	Opponent^{#}	Result	Record	Site (attendance) city, state
Regular season
Nov 23, 1990*		New Mexico Highlands	W 111–66	1–0	Pan American Center (8,324); Las Cruces, New Mexico
Nov 26, 1990*		Cal State Northridge	W 120–62	2–0	Pan American Center (9,198); Las Cruces, New Mexico
Nov 29, 1990*		UTEP	W 70–55	3–0	Pan American Center (13,787); Las Cruces, New Mexico
Dec 1, 1990*		Coppin State	W 76–66	4–0	Pan American Center (10,593); Las Cruces, New Mexico
Dec 4, 1990*		at UTEP	W 77–70	5–0	Special Events Center (11,305); El Paso, Texas
Dec 8, 1990*		at New Mexico; Rio Grande Rivalry	L 88–94	5–1	The Pit (18,100); Albuquerque, New Mexico
Dec 15, 1990*		New Mexico; Rio Grande Rivalry	W 72–64	6–1	Pan American Center (14,845); Las Cruces, New Mexico
Dec 22, 1990*		at Texas Tech	W 79–58	7–1	Lubbock Municipal Coliseum (9,263); Lubbock, Texas
Dec 29, 1990*	No. 24	Morgan State	W 128–71	8–1	Pan American Center (9,116); Las Cruces, New Mexico
Jan 4, 1991	No. 23	at Pacific	W 70–68	9–1 (1–0)	Alex G. Spanos Center (3,456); Stockton, California
Jan 7, 1991	No. 23	Long Beach State	W 80–63	10–1 (2–0)	Pan American Center (10,347); Las Cruces, New Mexico
Jan 12, 1991	No. 23	UC Santa Barbara	W 64–57	11–1 (3–0)	Pan American Center (11,952); Las Cruces, New Mexico
Jan 14, 1991	No. 23	at Fresno State	W 82–77	12–1 (4–0)	Selland Arena (9,645); Fresno, California
Jan 19, 1991	No. 21	at Cal State Fullerton	L 81–89	12–2 (4–1)	Titan Gym (2,119); Fullerton, California
Jan 21, 1991	No. 21	UC-Irvine	W 77–60	13–2 (5–1)	Pan American Center (9,148); Las Cruces, New Mexico
Jan 24, 1991	No. 23	San Jose State	W 88–58	14–2 (6–1)	Pan American Center (8,324); Las Cruces, New Mexico
Jan 26, 1991	No. 23	Utah State	W 86–66	15–2 (7–1)	Pan American Center (10,544); Las Cruces, New Mexico
Feb 2, 1991	No. 20	at Long Beach State	W 66–64	16–2 (8–1)	Gold Mine (1,987); Long Beach, California
Feb 9, 1991	No. 20	at UC Irvine	W 73–65	17–2 (9–1)	Bren Events Center (2,552); Irvine, California
Feb 11, 1991	No. 16	at UC Santa Barbara	W 67–64	18–2 (10–1)	The Thunderdome (4,670); Santa Barbara, California
Feb 14, 1991	No. 12	Cal State Fullerton	W 80–74	19–2 (11–1)	Pan American Center (11,411); Las Cruces, New Mexico
Feb 16, 1991	No. 12	at No. 1 UNLV	L 74–86	19–3 (11–2)	Thomas & Mack Center (18,902); Las Vegas, Nevada
Feb 21, 1991	No. 15	at Utah State	W 83–75	20–3 (12–2)	Dee Glen Smith Spectrum (6,631); Logan, Utah
Feb 23, 1991	No. 15	at San Jose State	W 73–67	21–3 (13–2)	The Event Center (2,565); San Jose, California
Feb 25, 1991	No. 15	No. 1 UNLV	L 74–86	21–4 (13–3)	Pan American Center (13,007); Las Cruces, New Mexico
Feb 28, 1991	No. 11	Pacific	W 67–60	22–4 (14–3)	Pan American Center (8,641); Las Cruces, New Mexico
Mar 2, 1991*	No. 11	Fresno State	W 105–80	23–4 (15–3)	Pan American Center (10,217); Las Cruces, New Mexico
Big West tournament
Mar 8, 1991*	No. 11	vs. Fresno State; Big West tournament Quarterfinal	L 82–88	23–5	Long Beach Arena (10,106); Long Beach, California
NCAA tournament
Mar 14, 1991*	(6 W) No. 15	vs. (11 W) Creighton; First Round	L 56–64	23–6	Jon M. Huntsman Center (12,276); Salt Lake City, Utah
*Non-conference game. ^{#}Rankings from AP Poll. (#) Tournament seedings in parentheses. W=West. All times are in Mountain Time.

== NBA draft ==
Round	Pick	Player	NBA club
2	31	Randy Brown	Sacramento Kings
