= Cleveland Edwards =

American basketball player and coach (1948-2019)

Personal information
- Born: February 5, 1948
- Died: August 17, 2019 (aged 71)
- Listed height: 5 ft 10 in (1.78 m)

Career information
- High school: Fifth Avenue (Pittsburgh, Pennsylvania)
- College: Robert Morris (1967–1969); Pittsburgh (1969–1972)
- Position: Guard
- Coaching career: 1972–1995

Career history

Coaching
- 1972–1973: Farrell HS
- 1973–1975: Robert Morris (assistant)
- 1975–1980: Pittsburgh (assistant)
- 1980–1984: Bishop Gorman HS
- 1984–1990: UNLV (assistant)
- 1990–1993: Marshall (assistant)
- 1994–1995: UNLV (assistant)
- 1995: UNLV (interim HC)

Career highlights
- As assistant coach: NCAA champion (1990)

Cleveland Edwards (February 5, 1948 – August 17, 2019) was an American basketball player and coach. Edwards served as head coach at UNLV for 14 games during the 1994-95 season.

Edwards was an NBA scout for several NBA teams and an assistant coach for several teams including Robert Morris, Pittsburgh, UNLV, and Marshall, winning a national title as an assistant with UNLV in 1990. He played college basketball for Robert Morris and Pittsburgh.

== Playing career ==
Edwards began his college basketball career in 1967, spending two years at Robert Morris until 1969, earning junior college All-America honors. In 1969, he transferred to Pittsburgh where he played until graduating in 1972. At Pittsburgh he finished his career with 243 points and 193 rebounds in 41 career games.

== Coaching career ==
Edwards graduated from the University of Pittsburgh in 1972 and began his coaching career at Farrell High School. From 1973 to 1975, he was an assistant coach at Robert Morris University. From 1975 to 1980, Edwards was an assistant coach at Pittsburgh under head coach Tim Grgurich. From 1980 to 1984, Edwards coached at Bishop Gorman High School and in 1984 became an assistant coach at UNLV under head coach Jerry Tarkanian. Edwards was at UNLV when the team won the 1990 NCAA Division I tournament. After winning the NCAA title at UNLV as an assistant, Edwards became an assistant at Marshall from 1990-1993.

In 1994, Edwards returned to UNLV under new head coach Tim Grgurich. He was briefly head coach at UNLV for 14 games during the 1994–95 season while Grgurich was on medical leave.

== Post-coaching career ==
Edwards left coaching in 1995 and became an NBA scout for 10 years for several NBA teams (Seattle SuperSonics, Portland Trail Blazers, Milwaukee Bucks, and Phoenix Suns) until his retirement in 2005.

In 2007, Edwards was inducted into the Robert Morris Athletics Hall of Fame.

== Death ==
On August 17, 2019, Edwards died of kidney and heart failure.
