= Sam Crawford (basketball) =

American former professional basketball player

Personal information
- Born: April 18, 1970 (age 56) Chicago, Illinois, U.S.
- Listed height: 5 ft 8 in (1.73 m)
- Listed weight: 155 lb (70 kg)

Career information
- High school: Westchester (Los Angeles, California)
- College: Moorpark CC (1989–1991); New Mexico State (1991–1993)
- NBA draft: 1993: undrafted
- Playing career: 1993–1995
- Position: Point guard

Career history
- 1993: Hartford Hellcats
- 1993–1994: Wichita Falls Texans
- 1994: Marinos de Oriente
- 1994–1995: Grand Rapids Mackers

Career highlights
- CBA All-Rookie Second Team (1994); AP Honorable Mention All-American (1993); Frances Pomeroy Naismith Award (1993); NCAA assists leader (1993); First-team All-Big West (1993); Second-team All-Big West (1992); Big West tournament MVP (1992)

Sam Crawford (born April 18, 1970) is an American former professional basketball player. An agile and diminutive point guard at 5 ft 8 in tall, he attended Moorpark community college for two years before transferring to a Division I program, New Mexico State. In 1992–93 he led the NCAA in assists with a 9.1 average, was awarded the Frances Pomeroy Naismith Award for the best college player under 6 ft and was an AP Honorable Mention. He is the all-time assists leader at New Mexico State with 592. After his senior year of college he went undrafted in the 1993 NBA draft and had a short professional career in the CBA. He also appeared in two movies: Blue Chips and Forget Paris.

== High school career ==
Crawford was born in Illinois to Debra Crawford; his biological father abandoned the family when Crawford was 3, and he was raised by his mother in Harvey, Illinois, a Chicago suburb. Crawford's aunt Mita married former NBA player Ron Carter, and Crawford usually spent his summers in Los Angeles, California with the two, playing in basketball camps. When he was 10, his mother decided that he should move in with Carter, in an attempt to keep his son away from a life of poverty.

Crawford attended Westchester High School in Los Angeles and he was one of the best players of the team together with Zan Mason, a Parade All-American and highly ranked prospect who would later play for UCLA. Crawford entered the starting five at Westchester in his freshman year, after a particularly good performance against Crenshaw, one of the top high school basketball teams in the area. Crawford and Mason led Westchester, and Crawford was named in the All-City team twice. In his junior season he averaged 17.4 points and 8.6 assists per game; in that same year, his aunt Mita and Carter divorced, and he refused to move with Carter in Sherman Oaks, Los Angeles: he then spent a period living on the streets of Westchester, and sometimes at his teammates' houses, working odd jobs. During his senior season of high school, Crawford had a personally successful season, but the team only finished with a 16–6 record.

== College career ==
He was recruited by Texas Tech and New Mexico State, but he was struggling with grades at Westchester and stopped attending classes after the end of the basketball season. At the end of his senior year he did not qualify academically, and according to Proposition 48 he could not attend a Division I college, having to sit out one year; after briefly attending Howard College in Big Spring, Texas, he decided to attend Moorpark College in Ventura County, California.

Crawford immediately found success at Moorpark, and was the best player of the team, scoring 20.7 points per game and averaging 12.1 assists (411 total) in his freshman season. He led the conference in assists and scored a school-record 49 points against Ventura College. In his sophomore season he played 27 games, totalling 357 assists with an average of 13.2, and averaged 19.4 points. He recorded a triple double with 24 points, 19 assists and 11 steals against Glendale on January 3, 1991. His performances at Moorpark caught the attention of Gar Forman, assistant coach at New Mexico State, who called Crawford and asked him to join the Aggies for the 1991–92 season.

Crawford transferred to New Mexico State and was named the starting point guard: he played 33 games, averaging 12.9 points and 8.5 assists with a field goal percentage of .420 (.401 from three). He led the nation in assists for most of his junior season, but ultimately finished second: while Crawford had the most assists (282), Van Usher of Tennessee Tech had a better average at 8.8 per game. He was named MVP of the 1992 Big West Conference tournament won by the Aggies. His 282 assists were a single-season school record at New Mexico State at the time.

Crawford's senior season in college was the most successful of his career. On December 21, 1992 he recorded 20 assists against Sam Houston State, only 2 shy of the all-time NCAA record of 22. Crawford led the Aggies in scoring and the entire NCAA in assists, being the top player both in total assists and in per-game average (9.1). He also recorded New Mexico State's single-season record with his 310 assists, breaking his own record established during the previous season. At the end of the season he won the Frances Pomeroy Naismith Award for best player under 6 ft in college basketball, and he was named an All-American Honorable Mention by Associated Press.

He is the all-time assists leader at New Mexico State with a total of 592, despite having played there only for two seasons.

=== College statistics ===
==== Community college ====
Year	Team	GP	GS	MPG	FG%	3P%	FT%	RPG	APG	SPG	BPG	PPG
1989–90	Moorpark CC	34		34.4	.479	.364	.782	3.0	12.1	3.1	0.1	20.7
1990–91	Moorpark CC	27		35.6	.470	.392	.755	3.2	13.2	4.0	0.1	19.4
Career		61		35.0	.475	.378	.769	3.1	12.7	3.6	0.1	20.1

==== Division I ====
*	Led NCAA Division I

Year	Team	GP	GS	MPG	FG%	3P%	FT%	RPG	APG	SPG	BPG	PPG
1991–92	New Mexico State	33	32	33.8	.420	.401	.775	2.3	8.5	1.9	0.0	12.9
1992–93	New Mexico State	34	31	34.6	.394	.322	.783	2.9	9.1*	1.4	0.0	12.9
Career		67	63	34.2	.406	.359	.779	2.6	8.8	1.6	0.0	12.9

== Professional career ==
In the days leading to the 1993 NBA draft Crawford was projected as a late second round pick, and he took part in Pre-Draft camps in Phoenix, Arizona. However, he ended up being not drafted by an NBA franchise.

Crawford then decided to join the Continental Basketball Association and signed for the Hartford Hellcats where he started 2 of 23 games, averaging 9.0 points, 6.7 assists and 1.1 steals in 25.2 minutes per game. During the same season he transferred to the Wichita Falls Texans where he was a starter (15 out of 18 games) and averaged 14.5 points, 9.9 assists and 0.9 steals in 37.9 minutes. Crawford was selected to the CBA All-Rookie Second Team in 1994.

In 1994 he played in the Liga Profesional de Baloncesto in Venezuela where he led the league in assists per game at 11.1 (267 in 24 games), the all-time league record for highest assists per game average in a single season. His last team in the CBA were the Grand Rapids Mackers where he only played 3 games, averaging 3.0 points and 0.3 assists in the 1994–95 season.
