= 1991–92 New Mexico State Aggies basketball team =

American college basketball season

1991–92 New Mexico State Aggies men's basketball

Big West tournament champions

NCAA tournament, Sweet Sixteen (vacated)
- Conference: Big West Conference
- Record: 23-7 (25–8 unadjusted) (12–6 Big West)
- Head coach: Neil McCarthy (7th season)
- Home arena: Pan American Center

1991–92 Big West men's basketball standings
	Conf.				Overall
Team	W		L	PCT	W		L	PCT
No. 7 UNLV	18	–	0	1.000	26	–	2	.929
UC Santa Barbara	13	–	5	.722	20	–	9	.690
New Mexico State†	12	–	6	.667	25	–	8	.758
Long Beach State	11	–	7	.611	18	–	12	.600
Utah State	10	–	8	.556	16	–	12	.571
Pacific	8	–	10	.444	14	–	16	.467
Cal State Fullerton	8	–	10	.444	12	–	16	.429
Fresno State	6	–	12	.333	15	–	16	.484
UC Irvine	3	–	15	.167	7	–	22	.241
San Jose State	1	–	17	.056	2	–	24	.077
† 1992 Big West tournament winner Rankings from AP poll

The 1991–92 New Mexico State Aggies men's basketball team represented New Mexico State University in the 1991–92 college basketball season. This was Neil McCarthy's 7th season as head coach. The Aggies played their home games at Pan American Center and competed in the Big West Conference. They finished the season 25–8, 12–6 in Big West play to earn a third-place finish in the conference regular season standings. They won the Big West tournament to earn an automatic bid to the NCAA tournament as No. 12 seed in the West region.

In the opening round, New Mexico State upset No. 5 seed DePaul, 81–73. The Aggies followed that success by defeating No. 13 seed Southwestern Louisiana to reach the Sweet Sixteen. Despite a valiant effort, New Mexico State lost to No. 1 seed UCLA in the West Regional semifinal, 85–78.

== Roster ==
1991–92 New Mexico State Aggies men's basketball team
Players
Coaches

Pos.	#	Name	Height	Weight	Year	Hometown
F	4	Tracey Ware	6 ft 7 in (2.01 m)	225 lb (102 kg)	Jr	Houston, TX
G	12	Sam Crawford	5 ft 8 in (1.73 m)	—	Jr
F	42	Cliff Reed	6 ft 5 in (1.96 m)	—	Jr
F	32	Eric Traylor	6 ft 7 in (2.01 m)	—	Jr

Head coach

- Neil McCarthy (Sacramento State)

Assistant coach(es)

Legend

- (C) Team captain
- (S) Suspended
- (I) Ineligible
- (W) Walk-on
- Injured
- Current redshirt

== Schedule and results ==
Date time, TV	Rank^{#}	Opponent^{#}	Result	Record	Site (attendance) city, state
Regular season
Nov 25, 1991*		Texas Southern	W 101–78	1–0	Pan American Center (8,947); Las Cruces, New Mexico
Nov 27, 1991*		Southern Utah	W 87–80	2–0	Pan American Center (6,812); Las Cruces, New Mexico
Nov 30, 1991*		at New Mexico	W 80–73	3–0	The Pit (18,100); Albuquerque, New Mexico
Dec 3, 1991*		UTEP	L 71–78	3–1	Pan American Center (12,984); Las Cruces, New Mexico
Dec 7, 1991*		at UTEP	W 63–61	4–1	Special Events Center (11,481); El Paso, Texas
Dec 11, 1991*		Western New Mexico	W 105–83	5–1	Pan American Center (9,973); Las Cruces, New Mexico
Dec 19, 1991*		at Texas Tech	W 76–68	6–1	Lubbock Municipal Coliseum (4,012); Lubbock, Texas
Dec 27, 1991*		Delaware State	W 109–73	7–1	Pan American Center (10,031); Las Cruces, New Mexico
Jan 2, 1992		at UC Irvine	W 75–71	8–1 (1–0)	Bren Events Center (2,372); Irvine, California
Jan 6, 1992*		New Mexico	W 68–63	9–1	Pan American Center (10,719); Las Cruces, New Mexico
Jan 9, 1992		UC Santa Barbara	W 72–63	10–1 (2–0)	Pan American Center (9,456); Las Cruces, New Mexico
Jan 11, 1992		Long Beach State	W 67–51	11–1 (3–0)	Pan American Center (10,239); Las Cruces, New Mexico
Jan 16, 1992		at San Jose State	W 81–73	12–1 (4–0)	Event Center Arena (1,485); San Jose, California
Jan 18, 1992		at Pacific	W 90–77 ^{2OT}	13–1 (5–0)	Alex G. Spanos Center (2,906); Stockton, California
Jan 25, 1992; 7:30 p.m.		UNLV	L 67–74	13–2 (5–1)	Pan American Center (13,071); Las Cruces, New Mexico
Jan 29, 1992		at Fresno State	L 69–76	13–3 (5–2)	Selland Arena (9,717); Fresno, California
Feb 4, 1992		at Cal State Fullerton	W 69–67	14–3 (6–2)	Titan Gym (1,824); Fullerton, California
Feb 6, 1992		at Long Beach State	L 76–92	14–4 (6–3)	Gold Mine (1,546); Long Beach, California
Feb 10, 1992		Utah State	W 75–69	15–4 (7–3)	Pan American Center (7,125); Las Cruces, New Mexico
Feb 13, 1992		Pacific	W 75–67	16–4 (8–3)	Pan American Center (6,817); Las Cruces, New Mexico
Feb 15, 1992		San Jose State	W 82–57	17–4 (9–3)	Pan American Center (7,810); Las Cruces, New Mexico
Feb 22, 1992; 9:05 p.m.		at UNLV	L 58–69	17–5 (9–4)	Thomas & Mack Center (17,375); Paradise, Nevada
Feb 24, 1992		at UC Santa Barbara	L 59–64	17–6 (9–5)	UC Santa Barbara Events Center (6,000); Santa Barbara, California
Feb 29, 1992		at Utah State	L 78–85 ^{OT}	17–7 (9–6)	Smith Spectrum (8,842); Logan, Utah
Mar 2, 1992		Fresno State	W 78–70	18–7 (10–6)	Pan American Center (7,531); Las Cruces, New Mexico
Mar 5, 1992		Cal State Fullerton	W 63–60	19–7 (11–6)	Pan American Center (8,832); Las Cruces, New Mexico
Mar 7, 1992		UC Irvine	W 99–71	20–7 (12–6)	Pan American Center (9,231); Las Cruces, New Mexico
Big West tournament
Mar 13, 1992*	(2)	vs. (7) Fresno State; Quarterfinals	W 86–85 ^{OT}	21–7	Long Beach Arena (1,964); Long Beach, California
Mar 14, 1992*	(2)	at (3) Long Beach State; Semifinals	W 80–72	22–7	Long Beach Arena (3,373); Long Beach, California
Mar 15, 1992*	(2)	vs. (5) Pacific; Championship	W 74–73	23–7	Long Beach Arena (1,631); Long Beach, California
NCAA tournament
Mar 20, 1992*	(12 W)	vs. (5 W) No. 24 DePaul; First round	W 81–73	24–7	ASU Activity Center (7,639); Tempe, Arizona
Mar 22, 1992*	(12 W)	vs. (13 W) Southwestern Louisiana; Second Round	W 81–73	25–7	ASU Activity Center (10,125); Tempe, Arizona
Mar 26, 1992*	(12 W)	vs. (1 W) No. 4 UCLA; West Regional semifinal – Sweet Sixteen	L 78–85	25–8	The Pit (15,914); Albuquerque, New Mexico
*Non-conference game. ^{#}Rankings from AP Poll. (#) Tournament seedings in parentheses. W=West. All times are in Mountain Time.
