= Bob Timmons =

American basketball coach

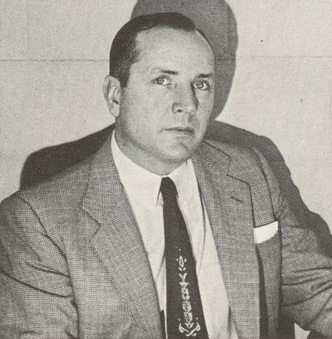
Timmons from The 1954 Owl

Robert Timmons (November 23, 1912 – April 29, 2004) was head coach of the University of Pittsburgh's men's basketball team, the Pittsburgh Panthers, from 1957 to 1968. Timmons' win–loss record at Pittsburgh was 174–189 (.479). He was a lieutenant in the South Pacific with the US Navy from 1942 to 1945. Timmons died in the Pittsburgh suburb of Glenshaw, Pennsylvania.
