= Elmore Spencer =

American basketball player (born 1969)

Personal information
- Born: December 6, 1969 (age 56) Atlanta, Georgia, U.S.
- Listed height: 7 ft 0 in (2.13 m)
- Listed weight: 270 lb (122 kg)

Career information
- High school: Booker T. Washington (Atlanta, Georgia)
- College: Georgia (1988–1989); Connors State (1989–1990); UNLV (1990–1992)
- NBA draft: 1992: 1st round, 25th overall pick
- Drafted by: Los Angeles Clippers
- Playing career: 1992–2001
- Position: Center
- Number: 27

Career history
- 1992–1995: Los Angeles Clippers
- 1995–1996: Denver Nuggets
- 1996: Portland Trail Blazers
- 1996: Seattle SuperSonics
- 1998–1999: Sioux Falls Skyforce
- 2000–2001: Fort Wayne Fury

Career highlights
- McDonald's All-American (1988); Fourth-team Parade All-American (1987)

Career NBA statistics
- Points: 923 (5.9 ppg)
- Rebounds: 555 (3.5 rpg)
- Block: 170 (1.1 bpg)
- Stats at NBA.com
- Stats at Basketball Reference

Elmore Spencer (born December 6, 1969) is an American former professional basketball player who was selected by the Los Angeles Clippers in the first round (25th pick overall) of the 1992 NBA draft. Spencer played for the Clippers, Denver Nuggets, Portland Trail Blazers, and Seattle SuperSonics in 5 NBA seasons. His best year as a pro came during the 1993-94 season as a Clipper when he appeared in 76 games and averaged 8.9 ppg. Born in Atlanta, Georgia, he played collegiately at the University of Georgia, Connors State College (where he led the team to the NJCAA National title his sophomore year) and the University of Nevada, Las Vegas.
