= Tim Grgurich =

American basketball coach (born 1942)

Personal information
- Born: July 10, 1942 (age 84) Pittsburgh, Pennsylvania, U.S.

Career information
- High school: Central Catholic (Pittsburgh, Pennsylvania)
- College: Pittsburgh (1961–1964)
- Position: Assistant coach
- Coaching career: 1964–2022

Career history

Coaching
- 1964–1975: Pittsburgh (assistant)
- 1975–1980: Pittsburgh
- 1981–1992: UNLV (assistant)
- 1992–1994: Seattle SuperSonics (assistant)
- 1994–1995: UNLV
- 1992–1999: Seattle SuperSonics (assistant)
- 1998–2002: Portland Trail Blazers (assistant)
- 2002–2005: Phoenix Suns (assistant)
- 2004–2006: Portland Trail Blazers (assistant)
- 2005–2011: Denver Nuggets (assistant)
- 2010–2017: Dallas Mavericks (assistant)
- 2016–2019: Milwaukee Bucks (assistant)
- 2018–2021: Detroit Pistons (assistant)

Career highlights
- NBA champion (2011); NCAA champion (1990)

Tim Grgurich (born June 10, 1942) is an American basketball coach. Grgurich served as the head coach at his alma mater, the University of Pittsburgh, for 5 seasons in the mid to late 1970s. He also served as the head coach at UNLV for the first seven games of the 1994–95 season before abruptly resigning. He arrived at UNLV in the mid-1980s, importing the amoeba defense developed when he was a Pitt assistant under Bob Timmons and Charles Ridl to Jerry Tarkanian's teams.

== Early life ==
A native of the Lawrenceville neighborhood of Pittsburgh, Grgurich attended Central Catholic High School. As a player at Pitt he led the team to two consecutive post season tournaments in 1963 and 1964. He then served 12 years (1964–1975) as an assistant coach and head of recruiting under Timmons and Ridl. Grgurich helped to develop Pitt's famous amoeba defense that along with the superlative play of All-American forward Billy Knight launched a 22-game win streak for Pitt in the 1973–1974 season under head coach 'Buzz' Ridl. This play carried Pitt to the Elite 8 that year, its furthest advance in the NCAA tournament since its Final Four appearance in 1941. The '74 season ended with a loss to eventual NCAA champion North Carolina State with David Thompson and Tom Burleson, in a game played on NC State's home court in Raleigh.

== Coaching career ==
After Ridl retired several seasons later, Grgurich was named head coach at Pitt for the 1975–1976 season. After two rebuilding seasons he coached Pitt to 3 consecutive winning seasons in his 5 total seasons there, and a post season bid in 1980. Grgurich finished with a record of 69–70, as his mostly undermanned teams were noted for playing with high energy, enthusiasm, and interesting defensive schemes. Grgurich continued those defensive stratagems while serving as the top assistant coach at UNLV, culminating with winning the NCAA championship in 1990 over top-ranked Duke. UNLV was also ranked #1 for all of 1991 and reached the Final Four again that year.

Grgurich has served as an assistant coach for several NBA teams including extended stays with the Seattle SuperSonics under fellow Pittsburgher George Karl. During his time in Seattle, the Sonics reached the NBA finals in 1996. Seattle's teams were noted for their defensive prowess implemented by Grgurich. Grgurich also was an assistant with the Portland Trail Blazers and the Denver Nuggets, again under George Karl. Grgurich has been sought after for his trusted knowledge of the game and his vast defensive coaching abilities and the enthusiasm he brings to the game. For the 2010–11 season he was hired as an assistant coach/consultant by fellow Pittsburgher and owner of the Dallas Mavericks, Mark Cuban. Since then, Grgurich has had similar consulting roles with the Denver Nuggets, Cleveland Cavaliers, and Milwaukee Bucks.

== Head coaching record ==
Record table
Season	Team	Overall	Conference	Standing	Postseason
Pittsburgh Panthers (NCAA Division I independent) (1975–1976)
1975–76	Pittsburgh	12–15			
Pittsburgh:		12–15			
Pittsburgh Panthers (Eastern Collegiate Basketball League / Eastern Athletic Association) (1976–1980)
1976–77	Pittsburgh	6–21	1–9	4th (West)	
1977–78	Pittsburgh	16–11	5–5	T–3rd	
1978–79	Pittsburgh	18–11	6–4	4th	
1979–80	Pittsburgh	17–12	5–5	T–4th	NIT first round
Pittsburgh:		69–70	17–23		
UNLV Runnin' Rebels (Big West Conference) (1994–1995)
1994–95	UNLV	2–5	0–2		
UNLV:		2–5	0–2		
Total:		71–78			

== Honours and awards ==
In 2024, he will be included in Croatian American Sports Hall of Fame.
