= 1989–90 NCAA Division I men's basketball season =

Basketball season

- Preseason AP No. 1: UNLV Runnin' Rebels
- NCAA Tournament: 1990
- Tournament dates: March 15 – April 2, 1990
- National Championship: McNichols Sports Arena; Denver, Colorado
- NCAA Champions: UNLV Runnin' Rebels
- Other champions: Vanderbilt Commodores (NIT)
- Player of the Year (Naismith, Wooden): Lionel Simmons, La Salle Explorers

The 1989–90 NCAA Division I men's basketball season began in November 1989 and ended with the Final Four at McNichols Sports Arena in Denver, Colorado, on April 2, 1990. The UNLV Runnin' Rebels won their first NCAA national championship with a 103–73 victory over the Duke Blue Devils.

== Season headlines ==
- The Associated Press (AP) Poll expanded from a Top 20 to a Top 25 format.
- Prior to the season, the West Coast Athletic Conference renamed itself the West Coast Conference.
- In a 1990 West Coast Conference men's basketball tournament semifinal game on March 4, 1990, Loyola Marymount forward Hank Gathers collapsed during the first half and stopped breathing. He was pronounced dead two hours later. The game and the rest of the tournament were cancelled. Regular-season champion Loyola Marymount received the conference's automatic bid in the 1990 NCAA tournament and made a run to the Elite Eight.
- Lionel Simmons became the first NCAA Division I player to score more than 3,000 points and gather more than 1,100 rebounds. The senior forward from La Salle averaged 26.5 points and 11.1 rebounds to earn National Player of the Year.

== Season outlook ==
=== Pre-season polls ===
The top 20 from the AP Poll and Coaches Poll during the pre-season.

Associated Press
Ranking	Team
1	UNLV
2	LSU
3	Syracuse
4	Michigan
5	Georgetown
6	Arizona
7	North Carolina
8	Illinois
9	Arkansas
10	Duke
11	Missouri
12	Louisville
13	UCLA
14	Indiana
15	Temple
16	Oklahoma
17	Notre Dame
18	Pittsburgh
19	NC State
20	Minnesota
21	Oklahoma State
22	Georgia Tech
23	Florida
24	Memphis
25	St. John's

UPI Coaches
Ranking	Team
1	UNLV
2	Syracuse
3	LSU
4	Georgetown
5	Michigan
6	Arizona
7	North Carolina
8	Illinois
9	Duke
10	Arkansas
10	Arizona
12	Indiana
13	UCLA
14	Louisville
15	Georgia Tech
16	Oklahoma
17	Temple
18	Pittsburgh
19	Notre Dame
20	Oklahoma State

== Conference membership changes ==
School	Former conference	New conference
Houston Baptist Huskies	Trans American Athletic Conference	NAIA independent
Loyola (Md.) Greyhounds	Northeast Conference	Metro Atlantic Athletic Conference
Marquette Warriors	NCAA Division I independent	Midwestern Collegiate Conference
Mount St. Mary's Mountaineers	NCAA Division I independent	Northeast Conference
Oral Roberts Titans	NCAA Division I independent	NAIA independent
Siena Saints	North Atlantic Conference	Metro Atlantic Athletic Conference
Southeastern Louisiana Lions	NCAA Division I independent	No team

== Regular season ==
=== Conferences ===
==== Conference winners and tournaments ====
Conference	Regular season first place	Conference player of the year	Conference Coach of the Year	Conference tournament	Tournament venue (city)	Tournament winner
American South Conference	Louisiana Tech & New Orleans	Tony Harris, New Orleans		1990 American South Conference men's basketball tournament	Convocation Center; Jonesboro, Arkansas	New Orleans
Atlantic 10 Conference	Temple	Kenny Green, Rhode Island	Bruce Parkhill, Penn State	1990 Atlantic 10 men's basketball tournament	The Palestra & McGonigle Hall; Philadelphia, Pennsylvania	Temple
Atlantic Coast Conference	Clemson	Dennis Scott, Georgia Tech	Cliff Ellis, Clemson	1990 ACC men's basketball tournament	Charlotte Coliseum; Charlotte, North Carolina	Georgia Tech
Big East Conference	Connecticut & Syracuse	Derrick Coleman, Syracuse	Jim Calhoun, Connecticut	1990 Big East men's basketball tournament	Madison Square Garden; New York, New York	Connecticut
Big Eight Conference	Missouri	Doug Smith, Missouri	Roy Williams, Kansas	1990 Big Eight Conference men's basketball tournament	Kemper Arena; Kansas City, Missouri	Oklahoma
Big Sky Conference	Idaho	Riley Smith, Idaho	Bob Hofman, Eastern Washington	1990 Big Sky Conference men's basketball tournament	BSU Pavilion; Boise, Idaho	Idaho
Big South Conference	Coastal Carolina	Tony Dunkin, Coastal Carolina	Russ Bergman, Coastal Carolina	1990 Big South Conference men's basketball tournament	Winthrop Coliseum; Rock Hill, South Carolina	Coastal Carolina
Big Ten Conference	Michigan State	Steve Scheffler, Purdue	Gene Keady, Purdue	No Tournament		
Big West Conference	UNLV	Larry Johnson, UNLV	Neil McCarthy, New Mexico State	1990 Big West Conference men's basketball tournament	Long Beach Arena; Long Beach, California	UNLV
Colonial Athletic Association	James Madison	Steve Hood, James Madison	Lefty Driesell, James Madison	1990 CAA men's basketball tournament	Richmond Coliseum; Richmond, Virginia	Richmond
East Coast Conference	Hofstra, Lehigh, & Towson State	Kurk Lee, Towson State	Dave Duke, Lehigh	1990 East Coast Conference men's basketball tournament	Towson Center; Towson, Maryland	Towson State
Ivy League	Princeton	Kit Mueller, Princeton	Not named	No Tournament		
Metro Conference	Louisville	Clarence Weatherspoon, Southern Mississippi	Bob Huggins, Cincinnati	1990 Metro Conference men's basketball tournament	Mississippi Coast Coliseum; Biloxi, Mississippi	Louisville
Metro Atlantic Athletic Conference	Holy Cross (North); La Salle (South)	Lionel Simmons, La Salle	George Blaney, Holy Cross	1990 MAAC men's basketball tournament	Knickerbocker Arena; Albany, New York	La Salle
Mid-American Conference	Ball State	Dave Jamerson, Ohio	Jim McDonald, Kent State	1990 MAC men's basketball tournament	Cobo Arena; Detroit, Michigan	Ball State
Mid-Continent Conference	SW Missouri State	Lee Campbell, SW Missouri State	Dick Bennett, Wisconsin-Green Bay	1990 Mid-Continent Conference men's basketball tournament	UNI-Dome; Cedar Falls, Iowa	Northern Iowa
Mid-Eastern Athletic Conference	Coppin State	Larry Stewart, Coppin State	Fang Mitchell, Coppin State	1990 MEAC men's basketball tournament	Greensboro Coliseum; Greensboro, North Carolina	Coppin State
Midwestern Collegiate Conference	Xavier	Tyrone Hill, Xavier	Pete Gillen, Xavier	1990 Midwestern Collegiate Conference men's basketball tournament	UD Arena; Dayton, Ohio	Dayton
Missouri Valley Conference	Southern Illinois	Bob Harstad, Creighton	Rich Herrin, Southern Illinois	1990 Missouri Valley Conference men's basketball tournament	Redbird Arena; Normal, Illinois	Illinois State
North Atlantic Conference	Northeastern	Steven Key, Boston University	Mike Jarvis, Boston University	1990 North Atlantic Conference men's basketball tournament	Hartford Civic Center; Hartford, Connecticut	Boston University
Northeast Conference	Robert Morris	Desi Wilson, Fairleigh Dickinson	Jarrett Durham, Robert Morris	1990 Northeast Conference men's basketball tournament	Charles L. Sewall Center; Moon Township, Pennsylvania	Robert Morris
Ohio Valley Conference	Murray State	Popeye Jones, Murray State	Steve Newton, Murray State	1990 Ohio Valley Conference men's basketball tournament	Racer Arena; Murray, Kentucky	Murray State
Pacific-10 Conference	Arizona & Oregon State	Gary Payton, Oregon State	Jimmy Anderson, Oregon State	1990 Pacific-10 Conference men's basketball tournament	University Activity Center; Tempe, Arizona	Arizona
Southeastern Conference	Georgia	Chris Jackson, LSU	Tommy Joe Eagles, Auburn	1990 SEC men's basketball tournament	Orlando Arena; Orlando, Florida	Alabama
Southern Conference	East Tennessee State	Keith Jennings, East Tennessee State, & John Taft, Marshall	Dana Altman, Marshall, & Les Robinson East Tennessee State	1990 Southern Conference men's basketball tournament	Asheville Civic Center; Asheville, North Carolina	East Tennessee State
Southland Conference	Northeast Louisiana	Anthony Pullard, McNeese State	Mike Vining, Northeast Louisiana	1990 Southland Conference men's basketball tournament	Fant–Ewing Coliseum; Monroe, Louisiana	Northeast Louisiana
Southwest Conference	Arkansas	Travis Mays, Texas	Nolan Richardson, Arkansas	1990 Southwest Conference men's basketball tournament	Reunion Arena; Dallas, Texas	Arkansas
Southwestern Athletic Conference	Southern	Joe Faulkner, Southern		1990 SWAC men's basketball tournament	Health and Physical Education Arena; Houston, Texas	Texas Southern
Sun Belt Conference	UAB	Chris Gatling, Old Dominion	Bobby Paschal, South Florida	1990 Sun Belt Conference men's basketball tournament	Birmingham–Jefferson Civic Center; Birmingham, Alabama	South Florida
Trans America Athletic Conference	Centenary	Larry Robinson, Centenary	Tommy Vardeman, Centenary	1990 TAAC men's basketball tournament	Barton Coliseum; Little Rock, Arkansas	Arkansas–Little Rock
West Coast Athletic Conference	Loyola Marymount	Bo Kimble, Loyola Marymount	Paul Westhead, Loyola Marymount	1990 West Coast Athletic Conference men's basketball tournament	Gersten Pavilion; Los Angeles, California	Semifinals and championship canceled
Western Athletic Conference	BYU & Colorado State	Mike Mitchell, Colorado State	Roger Reid, BYU	1990 WAC men's basketball tournament	Special Events Center; El Paso, Texas	UTEP

==== Conference standings ====
1989–90 American South Conference men's basketball standings
	Conf.				Overall
Team	W		L	PCT	W		L	PCT
Louisiana Tech	8	–	2	.800	20	–	8	.714
New Orleans †	8	–	2	.800	21	–	11	.656
Texas–Pan American	7	–	3	.700	21	–	9	.700
Southwestern Louisiana	4	–	6	.400	20	–	9	.690
Arkansas State	2	–	8	.200	15	–	13	.536
Lamar	1	–	9	.100	7	–	21	.250
† 1990 American South tournament winner Rankings from AP Poll

1989–90 Atlantic 10 men's basketball standings
	Conf.				Overall
Team	W		L	PCT	W		L	PCT
Temple †	15	–	3	.833	20	–	11	.645
Penn State	13	–	5	.722	25	–	9	.735
West Virginia	11	–	7	.611	16	–	12	.571
Rhode Island	11	–	7	.611	15	–	13	.536
Rutgers	11	–	7	.611	18	–	17	.514
UMass	10	–	8	.556	17	–	14	.548
George Washington	6	–	12	.333	14	–	17	.452
Saint Joseph's	5	–	13	.278	7	–	21	.250
Duquesne	5	–	13	.278	7	–	22	.241
St. Bonaventure	3	–	15	.167	8	–	20	.286
† 1990 Atlantic 10 Tournament winner Rankings from AP Poll

1989–90 ACC men's basketball standings
	Conf.				Overall
Team	W		L	PCT	W		L	PCT
No. 17 Clemson	10	–	4	.714	26	–	9	.743
No. 15 Duke	9	–	5	.643	29	–	9	.763
No. 9 Georgia Tech†	8	–	6	.571	28	–	7	.800
North Carolina	8	–	6	.571	21	–	13	.618
Virginia	6	–	8	.429	20	–	12	.625
NC State	6	–	8	.429	18	–	12	.600
Maryland	6	–	8	.429	19	–	14	.576
Wake Forest	3	–	11	.214	12	–	16	.429
† 1990 ACC tournament winner Rankings from AP Poll

1989–90 Big East men's basketball standings
	Conf.				Overall
Team	W		L	PCT	W		L	PCT
No. 4 Connecticut†	12	–	4	.750	31	–	6	.838
No. 6 Syracuse	12	–	4	.750	26	–	7	.788
No. 8 Georgetown	11	–	5	.688	24	–	7	.774
St. John's	10	–	6	.625	24	–	10	.706
Villanova	8	–	8	.500	18	–	15	.545
Providence	8	–	8	.500	17	–	12	.586
Seton Hall	5	–	11	.313	12	–	16	.429
Pittsburgh	5	–	11	.313	12	–	17	.414
Boston College	1	–	15	.063	8	–	20	.286
† 1990 Big East tournament winner As of April 2, 1990; Rankings from AP Poll

1989–90 Big Eight Conference men's basketball standings
	Conf.				Overall
Team	W		L	PCT	W		L	PCT
No. 11 Missouri	12	–	2	.857	26	–	6	.813
No. 1 Oklahoma †	11	–	3	.786	27	–	5	.844
No. 5 Kansas	11	–	3	.786	30	–	5	.857
Kansas State	7	–	7	.500	17	–	15	.531
Oklahoma State	6	–	8	.429	17	–	14	.548
Iowa State	4	–	10	.286	10	–	18	.357
Nebraska	3	–	11	.214	10	–	18	.357
Colorado	2	–	12	.143	12	–	18	.400
† 1990 Big Eight tournament winner As of March 3, 2012; Rankings from AP poll

1989–90 Big Sky men's basketball standings
	Conf.				Overall
Team	W		L	PCT	W		L	PCT
Idaho †	13	–	3	.813	25	–	6	.806
Eastern Washington	11	–	5	.688	18	–	11	.621
Montana	10	–	6	.625	18	–	11	.621
Nevada	9	–	7	.563	15	–	13	.536
Weber State	8	–	8	.500	14	–	15	.483
Montana State	8	–	8	.500	17	–	12	.586
Boise State	7	–	9	.438	12	–	15	.444
Northern Arizona	3	–	13	.188	8	–	20	.286
Idaho State	3	–	13	.188	6	–	21	.222
† Conference tournament winner

1989–90 Big South Conference men's basketball standings
	Conf.				Overall
Team	W		L	PCT	W		L	PCT
Coastal Carolina †	11	–	1	.917	23	–	6	.793
Campbell	7	–	5	.583	15	–	13	.536
UNC Asheville	7	–	5	.583	18	–	12	.600
Winthrop	6	–	6	.500	19	–	10	.655
Baptist	4	–	8	.333	9	–	19	.321
Augusta State	4	–	8	.333	8	–	20	.286
Radford	3	–	9	.250	7	–	22	.241
† 1990 Big South tournament winner Rankings from AP Poll

1989–90 Big Ten Conference men's basketball standings
	Conf.				Overall
Team	W		L	PCT	W		L	PCT
No. 3 Michigan State	15	–	3	.833	28	–	6	.824
No. 10 Purdue	13	–	5	.722	22	–	8	.733
No. 13 Michigan	12	–	6	.667	23	–	8	.742
No. 18 Illinois	11	–	7	.611	21	–	8	.724
No. 20 Minnesota	11	–	7	.611	23	–	9	.719
Ohio State	10	–	8	.556	17	–	13	.567
Indiana	8	–	10	.444	18	–	11	.621
Wisconsin	4	–	14	.222	14	–	17	.452
Iowa	4	–	14	.222	12	–	16	.429
Northwestern	2	–	16	.111	9	–	19	.321
Rankings from AP Poll

1989–90 Big West men's basketball standings
	Conf.				Overall
Team	W		L	PCT	W		L	PCT
No. 24 New Mexico State	16	–	2	.889	26	–	5	.839
No. 2 UNLV†	16	–	2	.889	35	–	5	.875
UC Santa Barbara	13	–	5	.722	21	–	9	.700
Long Beach State	12	–	6	.667	23	–	9	.719
Utah State	8	–	10	.444	14	–	16	.467
Pacific	7	–	11	.389	15	–	14	.517
Cal State Fullerton	6	–	12	.333	13	–	16	.448
San Jose State	5	–	13	.278	8	–	20	.286
Fresno State	4	–	14	.222	10	–	19	.345
UC Irvine	3	–	15	.167	5	–	23	.179
† 1990 Big West tournament winner Rankings from AP poll

1989–90 CAA men's basketball standings
	Conf.				Overall
Team	W		L	PCT	W		L	PCT
James Madison	11	–	3	.786	20	–	11	.645
Richmond †	10	–	4	.714	22	–	10	.688
American	10	–	4	.714	20	–	9	.690
George Mason	10	–	4	.714	20	–	12	.625
East Carolina	6	–	8	.429	13	–	18	.419
Navy	4	–	10	.286	5	–	23	.179
UNC Wilmington	3	–	11	.214	8	–	20	.286
William & Mary	2	–	12	.143	6	–	22	.214
† 1990 CAA tournament winner Rankings from AP Poll

1989–90 East Coast Conference men's basketball standings
	Conf.				Overall
Team	W		L	PCT	W		L	PCT
Lehigh	8	–	6	.571	18	–	12	.600
Towson State †	8	–	6	.571	18	–	13	.581
Hofstra	8	–	6	.571	13	–	15	.464
Delaware	7	–	7	.500	16	–	13	.552
Lafayette	7	–	7	.500	15	–	13	.536
Drexel	7	–	7	.500	13	–	15	.464
Bucknell	6	–	8	.429	15	–	14	.517
Rider	5	–	9	.357	10	–	18	.357
† 1990 ECC tournament winner Rankings from AP poll

1989–90 Ivy League men's basketball standings
	Conf.				Overall
Team	W		L	PCT	W		L	PCT
Princeton	11	–	3	.786	20	–	7	.741
Yale	10	–	4	.714	19	–	7	.731
Dartmouth	7	–	7	.500	12	–	14	.462
Harvard	7	–	7	.500	12	–	14	.462
Penn	7	–	7	.500	12	–	14	.462
Brown	7	–	7	.500	10	–	16	.385
Cornell	5	–	9	.357	12	–	17	.414
Columbia	2	–	12	.143	4	–	22	.154
Rankings from AP Poll

1989–90 Metro Conference men's basketball standings
	Conf.				Overall
Team	W		L	PCT	W		L	PCT
No. 16 Louisville †	12	–	2	.857	27	–	8	.771
Southern Miss	9	–	5	.643	20	–	12	.625
Cincinnati	9	–	5	.643	20	–	14	.588
Memphis State	8	–	6	.571	18	–	12	.600
Florida State	6	–	8	.429	16	–	15	.516
South Carolina	6	–	8	.429	14	–	14	.500
Virginia Tech	5	–	9	.357	13	–	18	.419
Tulane	1	–	13	.071	4	–	24	.143
† 1990 Metro Conference tournament winner Rankings from AP Poll

1989–90 MAAC men's basketball standings
	Conf.				Overall
Team	W		L	PCT	W		L	PCT
North
Holy Cross	14	–	2	.875	24	–	6	.800
Siena	11	–	5	.688	16	–	13	.552
Fordham	10	–	6	.625	20	–	13	.606
Canisius	5	–	11	.313	11	–	18	.379
Army	5	–	11	.313	10	–	19	.345
Niagara	5	–	11	.313	6	–	22	.214
South
No. 12 La Salle †	16	–	0	1.000	30	–	2	.938
Iona	8	–	8	.500	13	–	15	.464
Saint Peter's	7	–	9	.438	14	–	14	.500
Manhattan	7	–	9	.438	11	–	17	.393
Fairfield	6	–	10	.375	10	–	19	.345
Loyola (MD)	2	–	14	.125	4	–	24	.143
† 1990 MAAC tournament winner Rankings from AP poll

1989–90 Mid-American Conference men's basketball standings
	Conf.				Overall
Team	W		L	PCT	W		L	PCT
Ball State†	13	–	3	.813	26	–	7	.788
Kent State	12	–	4	.750	21	–	8	.724
Miami	9	–	7	.563	14	–	15	.483
Bowling Green	9	–	7	.563	18	–	11	.621
Eastern Michigan	8	–	8	.500	19	–	13	.594
Toledo	7	–	9	.438	12	–	16	.429
Central Michigan	6	–	10	.375	13	–	17	.433
Ohio	5	–	11	.313	12	–	16	.429
Western Michigan	3	–	13	.188	9	–	18	.333
† 1990 MAC tournament winner Rankings from AP Poll

1989–90 Mid-Continent Conference men's basketball standings
	Conf.				Overall
Team	W		L	PCT	W		L	PCT
Southwest Missouri State	11	–	1	.917	22	–	7	.759
Wisconsin–Green Bay	9	–	3	.750	24	–	8	.750
Western Illinois	6	–	6	.500	16	–	13	.552
Northern Iowa †	6	–	6	.500	23	–	9	.719
Illinois–Chicago	6	–	6	.500	16	–	12	.571
Eastern Illinois	3	–	9	.250	10	–	18	.357
Valparaiso	1	–	11	.083	4	–	24	.143
Cleveland State	0	–	0	–	15	–	13	.536
† 1990 Mid-Con Tournament winner Rankings from AP Poll

1989–90 MEAC men's basketball standings
	Conf.				Overall
Team	W		L	PCT	W		L	PCT
Coppin State †	15	–	1	.938	26	–	7	.788
Florida A&M	13	–	3	.813	18	–	11	.621
Delaware State	9	–	7	.563	14	–	14	.500
South Carolina State	8	–	8	.500	13	–	16	.448
Bethune–Cookman	8	–	8	.500	10	–	18	.357
North Carolina A&T	6	–	10	.375	12	–	17	.414
Howard	5	–	11	.313	8	–	19	.296
Maryland Eastern Shore	4	–	12	.250	10	–	17	.370
Morgan State	4	–	12	.250	8	–	20	.286
† 1990 MEAC tournament winner Rankings from AP Poll

1989–90 Midwestern Collegiate Conference men's basketball standings
	Conf.				Overall
Team	W		L	PCT	W		L	PCT
No. 25 Xavier	12	–	2	.857	28	–	5	.848
Dayton †	10	–	4	.714	22	–	10	.688
Saint Louis	9	–	5	.643	21	–	12	.636
Marquette	9	–	5	.643	15	–	14	.517
Evansville	8	–	6	.571	17	–	15	.531
Loyola (IL)	3	–	11	.214	7	–	22	.241
Detroit	3	–	11	.214	10	–	18	.357
Butler	2	–	12	.143	6	–	22	.214
† 1990 MCC tournament winner Rankings from AP

1989–90 Missouri Valley Conference men's basketball standings
	Conf.				Overall
Team	W		L	PCT	W		L	PCT
Southern Illinois	10	–	4	.714	26	–	8	.765
Illinois State †	9	–	5	.643	18	–	13	.581
Creighton	9	–	5	.643	21	–	12	.636
Tulsa	9	–	5	.643	17	–	13	.567
Bradley	6	–	8	.429	11	–	20	.355
Wichita State	6	–	8	.429	10	–	19	.345
Drake	5	–	9	.357	13	–	18	.419
Indiana State	2	–	12	.143	8	–	20	.286
† 1990 MVC tournament winner Rankings from AP Poll

1989–90 North Atlantic Conference men's basketball standings
	Conf.				Overall
Team	W		L	PCT	W		L	PCT
Northeastern	9	–	3	.750	16	–	12	.571
Boston University †	9	–	3	.750	18	–	12	.600
Hartford	8	–	4	.667	17	–	11	.607
Maine	6	–	6	.500	11	–	17	.393
Vermont	4	–	8	.333	13	–	17	.433
Colgate	3	–	9	.250	8	–	21	.276
New Hampshire	3	–	9	.250	5	–	23	.179
† 1990 NAC tournament winner Rankings from AP Poll

1989–90 Northeast Conference men's basketball standings
	Conf.				Overall
Team	W		L	PCT	W		L	PCT
Robert Morris†	12	–	4	.750	22	–	8	.733
Monmouth	11	–	5	.688	17	–	12	.586
Marist	10	–	6	.625	17	–	11	.607
Mount St. Mary's*	10	–	6	.625	16	–	12	.571
Saint Francis (PA)	10	–	6	.625	17	–	11	.607
Fairleigh Dickinson	8	–	8	.500	16	–	13	.552
Wagner	6	–	10	.375	11	–	17	.393
St. Francis (NY)	4	–	12	.250	9	–	18	.333
Long Island	1	–	15	.063	3	–	23	.115
† 1990 NEC tournament winner Rankings from AP Poll; *Ineligible for conference tournament

1989–90 Ohio Valley Conference men's basketball standings
	Conf.				Overall
Team	W		L	PCT	W		L	PCT
Murray State †	10	–	2	.833	21	–	9	.700
Tennessee Tech	9	–	3	.750	19	–	9	.679
Morehead State	7	–	5	.583	16	–	13	.552
Eastern Kentucky	7	–	5	.583	13	–	17	.433
Middle Tennessee	5	–	7	.417	12	–	15	.444
Tennessee State	2	–	10	.167	7	–	20	.259
Austin Peay	2	–	10	.167	10	–	19	.345
† 1990 OVC tournament winner Rankings from AP Poll

1989–90 Pacific-10 Conference men's basketball standings
	Conf.				Overall
Team	W		L	PCT	W		L	PCT
No. 22 Oregon State	15	–	3	.833	22	–	7	.759
No. 14 Arizona †	15	–	3	.833	25	–	7	.781
California	12	–	6	.667	22	–	10	.688
UCLA	11	–	7	.611	22	–	11	.667
Oregon	10	–	8	.556	15	–	14	.517
Stanford	9	–	9	.500	18	–	12	.600
USC	6	–	12	.333	12	–	16	.429
Arizona State	6	–	12	.333	15	–	16	.484
Washington	5	–	13	.278	11	–	17	.393
Washington State	1	–	17	.056	7	–	22	.241
† Conference tournament winner As of April 15, 1990; Rankings from AP Poll

1989–90 Southeastern Conference men's basketball standings
	Conf.				Overall
Team	W		L	PCT	W		L	PCT
Georgia	13	–	5	.722	20	–	9	.690
No. 23 Alabama †	12	–	6	.667	26	–	9	.743
No. 19 LSU	12	–	6	.667	23	–	9	.719
Tennessee	10	–	8	.556	16	–	14	.533
Kentucky	10	–	8	.556	14	–	14	.500
Ole Miss	8	–	10	.444	13	–	17	.433
Auburn	8	–	10	.444	13	–	18	.419
Mississippi State	7	–	11	.389	16	–	14	.533
Vanderbilt	7	–	11	.389	21	–	14	.600
Florida	3	–	15	.167	7	–	21	.250
† 1990 SEC tournament winner Rankings from AP poll

1989–90 Southern Conference men's basketball standings
	Conf.				Overall
Team	W		L	PCT	W		L	PCT
East Tennessee State †	12	–	2	.857	27	–	7	.794
Marshall	9	–	5	.643	15	–	13	.536
Appalachian State	8	–	6	.571	19	–	11	.633
VMI	7	–	7	.500	14	–	15	.483
Chattanooga	7	–	7	.500	14	–	14	.500
The Citadel	5	–	9	.357	12	–	16	.429
Furman	5	–	9	.357	15	–	16	.484
Western Carolina	3	–	11	.214	10	–	18	.357
† SoCon Tournament winner As of April 30, 1990; Rankings from AP poll

1989–90 Southland Conference men's basketball standings
	Conf.				Overall
Team	W		L	PCT	W		L	PCT
Northeast Louisiana †	13	–	1	.929	22	–	8	.733
McNeese State	11	–	3	.786	14	–	13	.519
Southwest Texas State	9	–	5	.643	13	–	15	.464
Sam Houston State	8	–	6	.571	10	–	18	.357
Texas–Arlington	6	–	8	.429	13	–	16	.448
Northwestern State	5	–	9	.357	10	–	19	.345
North Texas State	3	–	11	.214	5	–	25	.167
Stephen F. Austin	1	–	13	.071	2	–	25	.074
† 1990 Southland Conference tournament winner

1989–90 Southwest Conference men's basketball standings
	Conf.				Overall
Team	W		L	PCT	W		L	PCT
No. 7 Arkansas †	14	–	2	.875	30	–	5	.857
Houston	13	–	3	.813	25	–	8	.758
Texas	12	–	4	.750	24	–	9	.727
TCU	9	–	7	.563	16	–	13	.552
Baylor	7	–	9	.438	16	–	14	.533
Texas A&M	7	–	9	.438	14	–	17	.452
Rice	5	–	11	.313	11	–	17	.393
SMU	5	–	11	.313	10	–	18	.357
Texas Tech	0	–	16	.000	5	–	22	.185
† 1990 SWC tournament winner Rankings from AP Poll

1989–90 SWAC men's basketball standings
	Conf.				Overall
Team	W		L	PCT	W		L	PCT
Southern	12	–	2	.857	25	–	6	.806
Texas Southern †	10	–	4	.714	19	–	12	.613
Alabama State	7	–	7	.500	15	–	13	.536
Mississippi Valley State	7	–	7	.500	11	–	18	.379
Alcorn State	6	–	8	.429	7	–	22	.241
Prairie View A&M	5	–	9	.357	9	–	18	.333
Grambling	5	–	9	.357	9	–	19	.321
Jackson State	4	–	10	.286	9	–	19	.321
† 1990 SWAC tournament winner Rankings from AP Poll

1989–90 Sun Belt Conference men's basketball standings
	Conf.				Overall
Team	W		L	PCT	W		L	PCT
UAB	12	–	2	.857	22	–	9	.710
South Florida †	9	–	5	.643	20	–	11	.645
Old Dominion	7	–	7	.500	14	–	14	.500
Western Kentucky	7	–	7	.500	13	–	17	.433
UNC Charlotte	6	–	8	.429	16	–	14	.533
Jacksonville	5	–	9	.357	13	–	16	.448
South Alabama	5	–	9	.357	11	–	17	.393
VCU	5	–	9	.357	11	–	17	.393
† 1990 Sun Belt Conference tournament winner Rankings from AP Poll

1989–90 Trans America Athletic Conference men's basketball standings
	Conf.				Overall
Team	W		L	PCT	W		L	PCT
Centenary	14	–	2	.875	22	–	8	.733
UTSA	13	–	3	.813	22	–	7	.759
Arkansas–Little Rock †	12	–	4	.750	20	–	10	.667
Georgia Southern	11	–	5	.688	17	–	11	.607
Stetson	8	–	8	.500	15	–	17	.469
Hardin–Simmons	5	–	11	.313	9	–	18	.333
Samford	4	–	12	.250	6	–	22	.214
Georgia State	3	–	13	.188	5	–	23	.179
Mercer	2	–	14	.125	7	–	20	.259
† 1990 TAAC tournament winner Rankings from AP Poll

1989–90 West Coast Conference men's basketball standings
	Conf.				Overall
Team	W		L	PCT	W		L	PCT
No. 21 Loyola Marymount	13	–	1	.929	26	–	6	.813
Pepperdine	10	–	4	.714	17	–	11	.607
San Diego	9	–	5	.643	16	–	12	.571
Portland	7	–	7	.500	11	–	17	.393
Santa Clara	6	–	8	.429	9	–	19	.321
San Francisco	4	–	10	.286	8	–	20	.286
Saint Mary's	4	–	10	.286	7	–	20	.259
Gonzaga	3	–	11	.214	8	–	20	.286
Rankings from AP poll

1989–90 WAC men's basketball standings
	Conf.				Overall
Team	W		L	PCT	W		L	PCT
Colorado State	11	–	5	.688	21	–	9	.700
BYU	11	–	5	.688	21	–	9	.700
Hawaii	10	–	6	.625	25	–	10	.714
UTEP †	10	–	6	.625	21	–	11	.656
New Mexico	9	–	7	.563	20	–	14	.588
Wyoming	7	–	9	.438	15	–	14	.517
Utah	7	–	9	.438	16	–	14	.533
San Diego State	4	–	12	.250	13	–	18	.419
Air Force	3	–	13	.188	12	–	20	.375
† 1990 WAC tournament winner Rankings from AP Poll

=== Division I independents ===
A total of 19 college teams played as Division I independents. Among them, Wright State (21–7) had both the best winning percentage (.750) and the most wins.

1989–90 NCAA Division I men's basketball independents standings
	Conf.				Overall
Team	W		L	PCT	W		L	PCT
Wright State		–		–	21	–	7	.750
Northern Illinois		–		–	17	–	11	.607
Akron		–		–	16	–	12	.571
DePaul		–		–	20	–	15	.571
Notre Dame		–		–	16	–	13	.552
Miami (FL)		–		–	13	–	15	.464
UMKC		–		–	13	–	15	.464
Southern Utah		–		–	13	–	15	.464
UMBC		–		–	12	–	16	.429
U.S. International		–		–	12	–	16	.429
Liberty		–		–	11	–	17	.393
Youngstown State		–		–	8	–	20	.286
Brooklyn		–		–	7	–	21	.250
Central Florida		–		–	7	–	21	.250
Florida International		–		–	7	–	21	.250
Central Connecticut State		–		–	6	–	22	.214
Chicago State		–		–	6	–	22	.214
Nicholls State		–		–	4	–	23	.148
Davidson		–		–	4	–	24	.143
Rankings from AP Poll

=== Informal championships ===
Conference	Regular season winner	Most Valuable Player
Philadelphia Big 5	La Salle	Lionel Simmons, La Salle

La Salle finished with a 4–0 record in head-to-head competition among the Philadelphia Big 5.

=== Statistical leaders ===
Points per game			Rebounds per game			Assists per game			Blocked shots per game		
Player	School	PPG	Player	School	RPG	Player	School	APG	Player	School	BPG
Bo Kimble	Loyola Marymount	35.3	Anthony Bonner	Saint Louis	13.8	Todd Lehmann	Drexel	9.3	Kenny Green	Rhode Island	4.8
Kevin Bradshaw	U.S. International	31.3	Eric McArthur	UCSB	13.0	Aaron Mitchell	Louisiana-Lafayette	9.1	Dikembe Mutombo	Georgetown	4.1
Dave Jamerson	Ohio	31.2	LaPhonso Ellis	Notre Dame	12.6	Keith Jennings	East Tennessee State	8.7	Kevin Roberson	Vermont	3.8
Alphonso Ford	Mississippi Valley State	29.9	Tyrone Hill	Xavier	12.6	Otis Livingston	Idaho	8.5	Lorenzo Williams	Stetson	3.8
Steve Rogers	Alabama State	29.7	Lee Campbell	Missouri State	12.5	Kenny Anderson	Georgia Tech	8.1	Omar Roland	Marshall	3.6

== Postseason tournaments ==
=== NCAA Tournament ===
==== Final Four - McNichols Sports Arena, Denver, Colorado ====
National semifinals
E3	Duke	97
M4	Arkansas	83
S4	Georgia Tech	81
W1	UNLV	90

National championship game
E3	Duke	73
W1	UNLV	103

=== National Invitation Tournament ===
==== NIT Semifinals and Final ====
Semifinals
Penn State	62
Vanderbilt	75
Saint Louis	80
New Mexico	73

Finals
Vanderbilt	74
Saint Louis	72

Third place game
Penn State	83
New Mexico	81

== Award winners ==
=== Consensus All-American teams ===
Consensus First Team
Player	Position	Class	Team
Derrick Coleman	F	Senior	Syracuse
Chris Jackson	G	Sophomore	Louisiana State
Larry Johnson	F	Junior	UNLV
Gary Payton	G	Senior	Oregon State
Lionel Simmons	F	Senior	La Salle

Consensus Second Team
Player	Position	Class	Team
Hank Gathers	F/C	Senior	Loyola Marymount
Kendall Gill	G	Senior	Illinois
Bo Kimble	G/F	Senior	Loyola Marymount
Alonzo Mourning	C	Sophomore	Georgetown
Rumeal Robinson	G	Senior	Michigan
Dennis Scott	F	Junior	Georgia Tech
Doug Smith	F	Junior	Missouri

=== Major player of the year awards ===
- Wooden Award: Lionel Simmons, La Salle
- Naismith Award: Lionel Simmons, La Salle
- Associated Press Player of the Year: Lionel Simmons, La Salle
- UPI Player of the Year: Lionel Simmons, La Salle
- NABC Player of the Year: Lionel Simmons, La Salle
- Oscar Robertson Trophy (USBWA): Lionel Simmons, La Salle
- Adolph Rupp Trophy: Lionel Simmons, La Salle
- Sporting News Player of the Year: Dennis Scott, Georgia Tech

=== Major freshman of the year awards ===
- USBWA National Freshman of the Year: Kenny Anderson, Georgia Tech

=== Major coach of the year awards ===
- Associated Press Coach of the Year: Jim Calhoun, Connecticut
- UPI Coach of the Year: Jim Calhoun, Connecticut
- Henry Iba Award (USBWA): Roy Williams, Kansas
- NABC Coach of the Year: Jud Heathcote, Michigan State
- Naismith College Coach of the Year: Bobby Cremins, Georgia Tech
- CBS/Chevrolet Coach of the Year: Jim Calhoun, Connecticut
- Sporting News Coach of the Year: Jim Calhoun, Connecticut

=== Other major awards ===
- Frances Pomeroy Naismith Award (Best player under 6'0): Greg "Boo" Harvey, St. John's
- Robert V. Geasey Trophy (Top player in Philadelphia Big 5): Lionel Simmons, La Salle (3-time recipient)
- NIT/Haggerty Award (Top player in New York City metro area): Greg "Boo" Harvey, St. John's

== Coaching changes ==
A number of teams changed coaches during the season and after it ended.

Team	Former Coach	Interim Coach	New Coach	Reason
American	Ed Tapscott		Chris Knoche	
Arkansas–Little Rock	Mike Newell		Jim Platt	Newell left to coach Lamar.
Army	Les Wothke		Tom Miller	
Austin Peay	Lake Kelly		Dave Loos	
Boston University	Mike Jarvis		Bob Brown	Jarvis left to coach George Washington.
Chicago State	Tommy Suitts		Rick Pryor	
Cleveland State	Kevin Mackey		Mike Boyd	
Colorado	Tom Miller		Joe Harrington	Miller left to coach Army.
Columbia	Wally Halas		Jack Rohan	
Drake	Tom Abatemarco	Eddie Fields	Rudy Washington	
East Tennessee State	Les Robinson		Alan LeForce	Robinson left to coach NC State.
Eastern Washington	Bob Hofman		John Wade	
Florida	Norm Sloan	Don DeVoe	Lon Kruger	Sloan was forced to retire on October 31 during an investigation into illegal cash payments to players. DeVoe, the former coach of SEC rival Tennessee, served as interim before Kruger was hired away from Kansas State.
Florida International	Rich Walker		Bob Weltlich	
Fresno State	Ron Adams		Gary Colson	
George Washington	George Kuester		Mike Jarvis	
Howard	A. B. Williamson		Butch Beard	
Idaho	Kermit Davis		Larry Eustachy	Davis left to coach Texas A&M.
Idaho State	Jim Boutin		Herb Williams	
Kansas State	Lon Kruger		Dana Altman	Kruger left to coach Florida.
Lamar	Tony Branch		Mike Newell	
Long Beach State	Joe Harrington		Seth Greenberg	Harrington left to coach Colorado. Greenberg was an assistant under Harrington.
Loyola Marymount	Paul Westhead		Jay Hillock	Westehead returned to the NBA as coach of the Denver Nuggets.
Marshall	Dana Altman		Dwight Freeman	Altman left to coach Kansas State.
Maryland Eastern Shore	Steve Williams		Bob Hopkins	
Miami (FL)	Bill Foster		Leonard Hamilton	
Miami (OH)	Jerry Peirson		Joby Wright	
Montana State	Stu Starner		Mick Durham	
Morgan State	Nathaniel Taylor		Michael Holmes	
NC State	Jim Valvano		Les Robinson	
Nicholls State	Gordon C. Stauffer		Rickey Broussard	
Northern Arizona	Pat Rafferty		Harold Merritt	
Oklahoma State	Leonard Hamilton		Eddie Sutton	Hamilton left to coach Miami (FL).
Prairie View A&M	Jim Duplantier		Elwood Plummer	
Saint Joseph's	Jim Boyle		John Griffin	Boyle left to join the coaching staff off the Denver Nuggets.
Stephen F. Austin	Mike Martin		New Fowler	
Texas A&M	Shelby Metcalf	John Thornton	Kermit Davis	
UNC Wilmington	Robert McPherson		Kevin Eastman	
UTSA	Ken Burmeister		Stu Starner	
Virginia	Terry Holland		Jeff Jones	Holland retired from coaching to become UVA's athletic director.
Western Kentucky	Murray Arnold		Ralph Willard	
