= 1989–90 Richmond Spiders men's basketball team =

American college basketball season

1989–90 Richmond Spiders men's basketball

CAA tournament champions

NCAA tournament
- Conference: Colonial Athletic Association
- Record: 22–10 (10–4 CAA)
- Head coach: Dick Tarrant (9th season)
- Assistant coach: Benjy Taylor
- Home arena: Robins Center

1989–90 CAA men's basketball standings
	Conf.				Overall
Team	W		L	PCT	W		L	PCT
James Madison	11	–	3	.786	20	–	11	.645
Richmond †	10	–	4	.714	22	–	10	.688
American	10	–	4	.714	20	–	9	.690
George Mason	10	–	4	.714	20	–	12	.625
East Carolina	6	–	8	.429	13	–	18	.419
Navy	4	–	10	.286	5	–	23	.179
UNC Wilmington	3	–	11	.214	8	–	20	.286
William & Mary	2	–	12	.143	6	–	22	.214
† 1990 CAA tournament winner Rankings from AP Poll

The 1989–90 Richmond Spiders men's basketball team represented the University of Richmond in National Collegiate Athletic Association (NCAA) Division I college basketball during the 1989–90 season. Richmond competed as a member of the Colonial Athletic Association (CAA) under head basketball coach Dick Tarrant and played its home games at the Robins Center.

Richmond finished second in the CAA regular-season standings with a 10–4 conference record, and won the CAA tournament to earn an automatic bid to the 1990 NCAA tournament. In the opening round of the East regional, the #14 seed Spiders fell to #3 seed Duke, 81–46, to finish with a 22–10 record.

== Roster ==
1989–90 Richmond Spiders men's basketball team
Players
Coaches

Pos.	#	Name	Height	Weight	Year	Previous school	Hometown
G	10	Ken Atkinson	6 ft 1 in (1.85 m)	175 lb (79 kg)	Sr	St. Anthony's
G	24	Curtis Blair	6 ft 3 in (1.91 m)	—	So	Patrick Henry	Roanoke, Virginia
F	44	Kenny Wood	6 ft 6 in (1.98 m)	—	Fr
C		Jim Shields	6 ft 10 in (2.08 m)	—	So
F	55	Terry Connolly	6 ft 5 in (1.96 m)	—	Jr

Head coach

- Dick Tarrant

Assistant coach(es)

Legend

- (C) Team captain
- (S) Suspended
- (I) Ineligible
- (W) Walk-on
- Injured
- Current redshirt

== Schedule and results ==
Date time, TV	Rank^{#}	Opponent^{#}	Result	Record	Site city, state
Regular season
Nov 15, 1989*		at No. 19 NC State; Preseason NIT	L 48–57	0–1	Reynolds Coliseum; Raleigh, North Carolina
Nov 28, 1989*		at No. 21 Georgia Tech	L 74–87	0–2	Alexander Memorial Coliseum; Atlanta, Georgia
Dec 1, 1989*		Army	W 85–78	1–2	Robins Center; Richmond, Virginia
Dec 2, 1989*		South Carolina	W 66–60	2–2	Robins Center; Richmond, Virginia
Dec 4, 1989*		VMI	W 78–77	3–2	Robins Center; Richmond, Virginia
Dec 6, 1989*		at VCU	W 66–54	4–2	Richmond Coliseum; Richmond, Virginia
Dec 9, 1989*		Fairfield	W 69–57	5–2	Robins Center; Richmond, Virginia
Dec 20, 1989*		Old Dominion	W 69–62	6–2	Robins Center; Richmond, Virginia
Dec 21, 1989*		Virginia	L 57–69	6–3	Robins Center; Richmond, Virginia
Dec 28, 1989*		at Southern Utah	W 95–83	7–3	Centrum Arena; Cedar City, Utah
Dec 30, 1989*		at Nevada	L 71–83	7–4	Lawlor Events Center; Reno, Nevada
Jan 8, 1990		James Madison	W 70–59	8–4 (1–0)	Robins Center; Richmond, Virginia
Jan 10, 1990		American	W 61–59	9–4 (2–0)	Robins Center; Richmond, Virginia
Jan 13, 1990		at George Mason	W 87–73	10–4 (3–0)	Patriot Center; Fairfax, Virginia
Jan 15, 1990*		Wake Forest	W 51–49	11–4	Robins Center; Richmond, Virginia
Jan 17, 1990		Navy	L 46–57	11–5 (3–1)	Robins Center; Richmond, Virginia
Jan 20, 1990		at UNC-Wilmington	W 71–60	12–5 (4–1)	Trask Coliseum; Wilmington, North Carolina
Jan 24, 1990		East Carolina	W 71–54	13–5 (5–1)	Robins Center; Richmond, Virginia
Jan 27, 1990		at William & Mary	W 71–66	14–5 (6–1)	William and Mary Hall; Williamsburg, Virginia
Jan 29, 1990*		Old Dominion	L 74–76	14–6	Robins Center; Richmond, Virginia
Feb 2, 1990		at James Madison	L 43–77	14–7 (6–2)	JMU Convocation Center; Harrisonburg, Virginia
Feb 7, 1990		at American	L 58–61	14–8 (6–3)	Bender Arena; Washington, D.C.
Feb 10, 1990		George Mason	W 86–64	15–8 (7–3)	Robins Center; Richmond, Virginia
Feb 12, 1990*		Virginia Tech	W 86–82	16–8	Robins Center; Richmond, Virginia
Feb 14, 1990		at Navy	W 79–70	17–8 (8–3)	Halsey Field House; Annapolis, Maryland
Feb 17, 1990		UNC-Wilmington	W 77–70	18–8 (9–3)	Robins Center; Richmond, Virginia
Feb 21, 1990		at East Carolina	L 78–81	18–9 (9–4)	Williams Arena at Minges Coliseum; Greenville, North Carolina
Feb 24, 1990		William & Mary	W 72–54	19–9 (10–4)	Robins Center; Richmond, Virginia
CAA Tournament
Mar 3, 1990*		UNC-Wilmington; CAA Tournament Quarterfinal	W 67–52	20–9	Richmond Coliseum; Richmond, Virginia
Mar 4, 1990*		American; CAA Tournament Semifinal	W 91–90 ^{2OT}	21–9	Richmond Coliseum; Richmond, Virginia
Mar 5, 1990*		James Madison; CAA tournament championship	W 77–72	22–9	Robins Center; Richmond, Virginia
NCAA Tournament
Mar 16, 1990*	(14 E)	vs. (3 E) No. 15 Duke	L 46–81	22–10	Omni Coliseum; Atlanta, Georgia
*Non-conference game. ^{#}Rankings from AP poll. (#) Tournament seedings in parentheses. E=East. All times are in Eastern.
