= 1990 CAA men's basketball tournament =

- Classification: Division I
- Season: 1989–90
- Teams: 8
- Site: Richmond Coliseum; Richmond, VA
- Champions: Richmond (3rd title)
- Winning coach: Dick Tarrant (3rd title)
- MVP: Kenny Atkinson (Richmond)

1989–90 CAA men's basketball standings
	Conf.				Overall
Team	W		L	PCT	W		L	PCT
James Madison	11	–	3	.786	20	–	11	.645
Richmond †	10	–	4	.714	22	–	10	.688
American	10	–	4	.714	20	–	9	.690
George Mason	10	–	4	.714	20	–	12	.625
East Carolina	6	–	8	.429	13	–	18	.419
Navy	4	–	10	.286	5	–	23	.179
UNC Wilmington	3	–	11	.214	8	–	20	.286
William & Mary	2	–	12	.143	6	–	22	.214
† 1990 CAA tournament winner Rankings from AP Poll

The 1990 Colonial Athletic Association men's basketball tournament was held March 3–5 at the Richmond Coliseum in Richmond, Virginia. The Richmond Coliseum would remain the home of the tournament until 2014.

Richmond defeated top-seeded James Madison in the championship game, 77–72, to win their third CAA men's basketball tournament. The Spiders, therefore, earned an automatic bid to the 1990 NCAA tournament.

== Bracket ==
Quarterfinals; Saturday, March 3
1	James Madison	93
8	William & Mary	83
5	East Carolina	63
4	George Mason	79
3	American	71
6	Navy	61
7	UNC Wilmington	52
2	Richmond	67

Semifinals; Sunday, March 4
1	James Madison	88
4	George Mason	75
3	American	90
2	Richmond	91

Championship; Monday, March 5
1	James Madison	72
2	Richmond	77
