= 1990 NCAA Division I men's basketball tournament =

Edition of USA college basketball tournament

- Season: 1989–90
- Teams: 64
- Finals site: McNichols Sports Arena, Denver, Colorado
- Champions: UNLV Runnin' Rebels (1st title, 1st title game, 3rd Final Four)
- Runner-up: Duke Blue Devils (4th title game, 8th Final Four)
- Semifinalists: Arkansas Razorbacks (4th Final Four); Georgia Tech Yellow Jackets (1st Final Four)
- Winning coach: Jerry Tarkanian (1st title)
- MOP: Anderson Hunt (UNLV)
- Attendance: 537,138
- Top scorer: Dennis Scott (Georgia Tech) (153 points)

The 1990 NCAA Division I men's basketball tournament involved 64 schools playing in a single-elimination tournament to determine the NCAA Division I men's basketball national champion for the 1989-1990 season. The 52nd annual edition of the tournament began on March 15, 1990, and ended with the championship game on April 2 at the McNichols Sports Arena in Denver, Colorado. A total of 63 games were played.

UNLV won the national title with a 103–73 victory in the final game over Duke. In doing so, UNLV set the NCAA Division I men's basketball tournament record for largest margin of victory in a championship game. UNLV's championship win marked the last time a school from a non-power conference had won the tournament until UConn from the American Conference in 2014. Anderson Hunt of UNLV was named the tournament's Most Outstanding Player.

This tournament is also remembered for an emotional run by the Loyola Marymount Lions (LMU) in the West region. In the quarterfinals of the West Coast Conference tournament against the Portland Pilots, Lions star forward Hank Gathers collapsed and died due to a heart condition. The WCC tournament was immediately suspended and LMU, the regular-season champion, was given the conference's automatic bid to the tournament. The team defeated New Mexico State, then laid a 34-point thrashing on defending national champion Michigan, and defeated Alabama in the Sweet Sixteen (the only game in which LMU did not score 100 or more points in the tournament) before running into eventual champion UNLV in the regional final. Gathers' childhood friend, Bo Kimble, the team's undisputed floor leader in the wake of the tragedy, paid tribute to his friend by attempting his first free throw in each game left-handed despite being right-handed (Gathers was right-handed, but struggled so much with free throws that he tried shooting them left-handed for a time.) Kimble made all of his left-handed attempts in the tournament.

The tournament employed a new timing system borrowed from FIBA & the NBA: when the game was played in an NBA arena, the final minute of the period is measured in tenths-seconds, rather than whole seconds as in previous years.

== Schedule and venues ==
1990 first and second rounds
1990 Regionals (blue) and Final Four (red)

The following are the sites that were selected to host each round of the 1990 tournament, and their host(s):

First and Second Rounds

- March 15 and 17
  - East Region
    - Hartford Civic Center, Hartford, Connecticut (Host: University of Connecticut)
  - Midwest Region
    - Frank Erwin Center, Austin, Texas (Host: University of Texas at Austin)
  - Southeast Region
    - Thompson–Boling Arena, Knoxville, Tennessee (Host: University of Tennessee)
  - West Region
    - Jon M. Huntsman Center, Salt Lake City, Utah (Host: University of Utah)
- March 16 and 18
  - East Region
    - Omni Coliseum, Atlanta, Georgia (Host: Georgia Institute of Technology)
  - Midwest Region
    - Hoosier Dome, Indianapolis, Indiana (Hosts: Butler University, Midwestern Collegiate Conference)
  - Southeast Region
    - Richmond Coliseum, Richmond, Virginia (Hosts: University of Richmond, Virginia Commonwealth University)
  - West Region
    - Long Beach Arena, Long Beach, California (Host: Long Beach State University)

Regional semifinals and finals (Sweet Sixteen and Elite Eight)

- March 22 and 24
  - East Regional, Brendan Byrne Arena, East Rutherford, New Jersey (Hosts: Seton Hall University, Big East Conference)
  - Midwest Regional, Reunion Arena, Dallas, Texas (Host: Southwest Conference)
- March 23 and 25
  - Southeast Regional, Louisiana Superdome, New Orleans, Louisiana (Hosts: Tulane University, University of New Orleans)
  - West Regional, Oakland–Alameda County Coliseum Arena, Oakland, California (Host: University of California, Berkeley)

National semifinals and championship (Final Four and championship)

- March 31 and April 2
  - McNichols Sports Arena, Denver, Colorado (Hosts: University of Colorado Boulder, Big 8 Conference)

== Teams ==
Region	Seed	Team	Coach	Conference	Finished	Final Opponent	Score
East
East	1	Connecticut	Jim Calhoun	Big East	Elite 8	3 Duke	L 79–78
East	2	Kansas	Roy Williams	Big Eight	Round of 32	7 UCLA	L 71–70
East	3	Duke	Mike Krzyzewski	Atlantic Coast	National Runner Up	1 UNLV	L 103–73
East	4	La Salle	Speedy Morris	Metro Atlantic	Round of 32	5 Clemson	L 79–75
East	5	Clemson	Cliff Ellis	Atlantic Coast	Sweet Sixteen	1 Connecticut	L 71–70
East	6	St. John's	Lou Carnesecca	Big East	Round of 32	3 Duke	L 76–72
East	7	UCLA	Jim Harrick	Pacific-10	Sweet Sixteen	3 Duke	L 90–81
East	8	Indiana	Bob Knight	Big Ten	Round of 64	9 California	L 65–63
East	9	California	Lou Campanelli	Pacific-10	Round of 32	1 Connecticut	L 74–54
East	10	UAB	Gene Bartow	Sun Belt	Round of 64	7 UCLA	L 68–56
East	11	Temple	John Chaney	Atlantic 10	Round of 64	6 St. John's	L 81–65
East	12	BYU	Roger Reid	Western Athletic	Round of 64	5 Clemson	L 49–47
East	13	Southern Miss	M.K. Turk	Metro	Round of 64	4 La Salle	L 79–63
East	14	Richmond	Dick Tarrant	Colonial	Round of 64	3 Duke	L 81–46
East	15	Robert Morris	Jarrett Durham	Northeast	Round of 64	2 Kansas	L 79–71
East	16	Boston University	Mike Jarvis	North Atlantic	Round of 64	1 Connecticut	L 76–52
Midwest
Midwest	1	Oklahoma	Billy Tubbs	Big Eight	Round of 32	8 North Carolina	L 79–77
Midwest	2	Purdue	Gene Keady	Big Ten	Round of 32	10 Texas	L 73–72
Midwest	3	Georgetown	John Thompson	Big East	Round of 32	6 Xavier	L 74–71
Midwest	4	Arkansas	Nolan Richardson	Southwest	National semifinals	3 Duke	L 97–83
Midwest	5	Illinois	Lou Henson	Big Ten	Round of 64	12 Dayton	L 88–86
Midwest	6	Xavier	Pete Gillen	Midwestern	Sweet Sixteen	10 Texas	L 102–89
Midwest	7	Georgia	Hugh Durham	Southeastern	Round of 64	10 Texas	L 100–88
Midwest	8	North Carolina	Dean Smith	Atlantic Coast	Sweet Sixteen	4 Arkansas	L 96–73
Midwest	9	Southwest Missouri State	Charlie Spoonhour	Mid-Continent	Round of 64	8 North Carolina	L 83–70
Midwest	10	Texas	Tom Penders	Southwest	Elite 8	4 Arkansas	L 88–85
Midwest	11	Kansas State	Lon Kruger	Big Eight	Round of 64	6 Xavier	L 87–79
Midwest	12	Dayton	Jim O'Brien	Midwestern	Round of 32	4 Arkansas	L 86–84
Midwest	13	Princeton	Pete Carril	Ivy League	Round of 64	4 Arkansas	L 68–64
Midwest	14	Texas Southern	Robert Moreland	Southwest Athletic	Round of 64	3 Georgetown	L 70–52
Midwest	15	Northeast Louisiana	Mike Vining	Southland	Round of 64	2 Purdue	L 75–63
Midwest	16	Towson State	Terry Truax	East Coast	Round of 64	1 Oklahoma	L 77–68
Southeast
Southeast	1	Michigan State	Jud Heathcote	Big Ten	Sweet Sixteen	4 Georgia Tech	L 81–80
Southeast	2	Syracuse	Jim Boeheim	Big East	Sweet Sixteen	6 Minnesota	L 82–75
Southeast	3	Missouri	Norm Stewart	Big Eight	Round of 64	14 Northern Iowa	L 74–71
Southeast	4	Georgia Tech	Bobby Cremins	Atlantic Coast	National semifinals	1 UNLV	L 90–81
Southeast	5	LSU	Dale Brown	Southeastern	Round of 32	4 Georgia Tech	L 94–91
Southeast	6	Minnesota	Clem Haskins	Big Ten	Elite 8	4 Georgia Tech	L 93–91
Southeast	7	Virginia	Terry Holland	Atlantic Coast	Round of 32	2 Syracuse	L 63–61
Southeast	8	Houston	Pat Foster	Southwest	Round of 64	9 UC Santa Barbara	L 70–66
Southeast	9	UC Santa Barbara	Jerry Pimm	Big West	Round of 32	1 Michigan State	L 62–58
Southeast	10	Notre Dame	Digger Phelps	Independent	Round of 64	7 Virginia	L 75–67
Southeast	11	UTEP	Don Haskins	Western Athletic	Round of 64	6 Minnesota	L 64–61
Southeast	12	Villanova	Rollie Massimino	Big East	Round of 64	5 LSU	L 70–63
Southeast	13	East Tennessee State	Les Robinson	Southern	Round of 64	4 Georgia Tech	L 99–83
Southeast	14	Northern Iowa	Eldon Miller	Mid-Continent	Round of 32	6 Minnesota	L 81–78
Southeast	15	Coppin State	Ron Mitchell	Mid-Eastern	Round of 64	2 Syracuse	L 70–48
Southeast	16	Murray State	Steve Newton	Ohio Valley	Round of 64	1 Michigan State	L 75–71
West
West	1	UNLV	Jerry Tarkanian	Big West	Champion	3 Duke	W 103–73
West	2	Arizona	Lute Olson	Pacific-10	Round of 32	7 Alabama	L 77–55
West	3	Michigan	Steve Fisher	Big Ten	Round of 32	11 Loyola Marymount	L 149–115
West	4	Louisville	Denny Crum	Metro	Round of 32	12 Ball State	L 62–60
West	5	Oregon State	Jim Anderson	Pacific-10	Round of 64	12 Ball State	L 54–53
West	6	New Mexico State	Neil McCarthy	Big West	Round of 64	11 Loyola Marymount	L 111–92
West	7	Alabama	Wimp Sanderson	Southeastern	Sweet Sixteen	11 Loyola Marymount	L 62–60
West	8	Ohio State	Randy Ayers	Big Ten	Round of 32	1 UNLV	L 76–65
West	9	Providence	Rick Barnes	Big East	Round of 64	8 Ohio State	L 84–83
West	10	Colorado State	Boyd Grant	Western Athletic	Round of 64	7 Alabama	L 71–54
West	11	Loyola Marymount	Paul Westhead	West Coast	Elite 8	1 UNLV	L 131–101
West	12	Ball State	Dick Hunsaker	Mid-American	Sweet Sixteen	1 UNLV	L 69–67
West	13	Idaho	Kermit Davis	Big Sky	Round of 64	4 Louisville	L 78–59
West	14	Illinois State	Bob Bender	Missouri Valley	Round of 64	3 Michigan	L 76–70
West	15	South Florida	Bobby Paschal	Sun Belt	Round of 64	2 Arizona	L 79–67
West	16	Little Rock	Mike Newell	Trans America	Round of 64	1 UNLV	L 102–72

== Bracket ==
=== East Regional – East Rutherford, New Jersey ===
First round
1	Connecticut	76
16	Boston University	52
Hartford
8	Indiana	63
9	California	65
5	Clemson	49
12	BYU	47
Hartford
4	La Salle	79
13	Southern Miss	63
6	St. John's	81
11	Temple	65
Atlanta
3	Duke	81
14	Richmond	46
7	UCLA	68
10	UAB	56
Atlanta
2	Kansas	79
15	Robert Morris	71

Second Round
1	Connecticut	74
9	California	54
5	Clemson	79
4	La Salle	75
6	St. John's	72
3	Duke	76
7	UCLA	71
2	Kansas	70

Regional semifinals
1	Connecticut	71
5	Clemson	70
3	Duke	90
7	UCLA	81

Regional Final
1	Connecticut	78
3	Duke	79^{OT}

==== Regional Final summary ====
CBS

Saturday, March 24

box score

#3 Duke Blue Devils 79, #1 Connecticut Huskies 78 (OT)
Pts: A. Abdelnaby 27; Rebs: A. Abdelnaby 14; Asts: B. Hurley 8	Pts: J. Gwynn, N. Henefeld 15; Rebs: N. Henefeld 6 Asts: C. Smith 5 Halftime Score: Duke, 37–30; End of Regulation: 72–72

Brendan Byrne Arena – East Rutherford, New Jersey
Attendance: 19,546

=== Midwest Regional – Dallas, Texas ===
First round
1	Oklahoma	77
16	Towson State	68
Austin
8	North Carolina	83
9	SW Missouri State	70
5	Illinois	86
12	Dayton	88
Austin
4	Arkansas	68
13	Princeton	64
6	Xavier	87
11	Kansas State	79
Indianapolis
3	Georgetown	70
14	Texas Southern	52
7	Georgia	88
10	Texas	100
Indianapolis
2	Purdue	75
15	Northeast Louisiana	63

Second Round
1	Oklahoma	77
8	North Carolina	79
12	Dayton	84
4	Arkansas	86
6	Xavier	74
3	Georgetown	71
10	Texas	73
2	Purdue	72

Regional semifinals
8	North Carolina	73
4	Arkansas	96
6	Xavier	89
10	Texas	102

Regional Final
4	Arkansas	88
10	Texas	85

==== Regional Final summary ====
CBS

Saturday, March 24

box score

#4 Arkansas Razorbacks 88, #10 Texas Longhorns 85
Pts: L. Howell 21; Rebs: L. Howell, O. Miller 9 Asts: L. Mayberry 7	Pts: J. Wright, T. Mays 20; Rebs: L. Collie 14; Asts: T. Mays 5 Halftime Score: Arkansas, 43–36

Reunion Arena – Dallas, Texas
Attendance: 16,413

=== Southeast Regional – New Orleans, Louisiana ===
First round
1	Michigan State	75^{OT}
16	Murray State	71
Knoxville
8	Houston	66
9	UC Santa Barbara	70
5	LSU	70
12	Villanova	63
Knoxville
4	Georgia Tech	99
13	East Tennessee State	83
6	Minnesota	64^{OT}
11	UTEP	61
Richmond
3	Missouri	71
14	Northern Iowa	74
7	Virginia	75
10	Notre Dame	67
Richmond
2	Syracuse	70
15	Coppin State	48

Second Round
1	Michigan State	62
9	UC Santa Barbara	58
5	LSU	91
4	Georgia Tech	94
6	Minnesota	81
14	Northern Iowa	78
7	Virginia	61
2	Syracuse	63

Regional semifinals
1	Michigan State	80
4	Georgia Tech	81^{OT}
6	Minnesota	82
2	Syracuse	75

Regional Final
4	Georgia Tech	93
6	Minnesota	91

==== Regional Final summary ====
CBS

Sunday, March 25

box score

#4 Georgia Tech Yellow Jackets 93, #6 Minnesota Golden Gophers 91
Pts: D. Scott 40; Rebs: K. Anderson 8 Asts: K. Anderson 3	Pts: W. Burton 35; Rebs: R. Coffey 9 Asts: M. Newbern 6 Halftime Score: Minnesota, 49–47

Louisiana Superdome – New Orleans
Attendance: 17,782

=== West Regional – Oakland, California ===
First round
1	UNLV	102
16	Arkansas–Little Rock	72
Salt Lake City
8	Ohio State	84^{OT}
9	Providence	83
5	Oregon State	53
12	Ball State	54
Salt Lake City
4	Louisville	78
13	Idaho	59
6	New Mexico State	92
11	Loyola Marymount	111
Long Beach
3	Michigan	76
14	Illinois State	70
7	Alabama	71
10	Colorado State	54
Long Beach
2	Arizona	79
15	South Florida	67

Second Round
1	UNLV	76
8	Ohio State	65
12	Ball State	62
4	Louisville	60
11	Loyola Marymount	149
3	Michigan	115
7	Alabama	77
2	Arizona	55

Regional semifinals
1	UNLV	69
12	Ball State	67
11	Loyola Marymount	62
7	Alabama	60

Regional Final
1	UNLV	131
11	Loyola Marymount	101

==== Regional Final summary ====
CBS

Sunday, March 25

box score

#1 UNLV Runnin' Rebels 131, #11 Loyola Marymount Lions 101
Pts: S. Augmon 33; Rebs: L. Johnson 18; Asts: A. Hunt 13	Pts: B. Kimble 42; Rebs: B. Kimble 11; Asts: T. Lowery 6 Halftime Score: UNLV, 67–47

Oakland–Alameda County Coliseum Arena – Oakland, California
Attendance: 14,298

=== Final Four – Denver, Colorado ===
National semifinals
E3	Duke	97
MW4	Arkansas	83
SE4	Georgia Tech	81
W1	UNLV	90

National Championship Game
E3	Duke	73
W1	UNLV	103

=== Game summaries ===
CBS

March 31

box score

#1 UNLV Runnin' Rebels 90, #4 Georgia Tech Yellow Jackets 81
Pts: S. Augmon 22; Rebs: M. Scurry 11; Asts: A. Hunt 7	Pts: D. Scott 29; Rebs: J. McNeil 9 Asts: K. Anderson 8 Halftime Score: Georgia Tech 53–46

McNichols Arena – Denver
Attendance: 17,675
Referees: Jim Bain, Dick Paparo, Jim Stupin

CBS

March 31

box score

#3 Duke Blue Devils 97, #4 Arkansas Razorbacks 83
Pts: P. Henderson 28; Rebs: C. Laettner 14; Asts: B. Hurley 6	Pts: T. Day 27; Rebs: T. Day 7 Asts: L. Mayberry 6 Halftime Score: Duke, 46–43

McNichols Arena – Denver
Attendance: 17,675
Referees: Gerry Donaghy, Jim Burr, Frank Bosone

=== National Championship ===
CBS

April 2

Box score

#1 UNLV Runnin' Rebels 103, #3 Duke Blue Devils 73
Pts: A. Hunt 29; Rebs: L. Johnson 11; Asts: S. Augmon 7	Pts: P. Henderson 21; Rebs: C. Laettner 9 Asts: C. Laettner 5 Halftime Score: UNLV, 47–35

McNichols Arena – Denver
Attendance: 17,675
Referees: Ed Hightower, Richie Ballesteros and Tim Higgins

== Announcers ==
=== CBS ===
CBS and NCAA Productions broadcast all tournament games.

- Jim Nantz and James Brown served as hosts for the first-round games, while Mike Francesca served as analyst for the remaining rounds of the tournament.
- Brent Musburger and Billy Packer – First round (Ohio State–Providence) at Salt Lake City, Utah; Second Round at Austin, Texas and Richmond, Virginia; West Regional at Oakland, California; Final Four at Denver, Colorado. Musburger's final games for CBS.
- Dick Stockton and Hubie Brown – Second Round at Atlanta, Georgia; East Regional at East Rutherford, New Jersey
- James Brown and Bill Raftery – Second Round at Hartford, Connecticut and Indianapolis, Indiana; Midwest Regional at Dallas, Texas
- Greg Gumbel and Quinn Buckner – First round (New Mexico State–Loyola-Marymount) and Second Round at Long Beach, California; Southeast Regional at New Orleans, Louisiana
- Brad Nessler and Tom Heinsohn – Second Round at Knoxville, Tennessee
- Tim Brant and Len Elmore – Second Round at Salt Lake City, Utah

=== ESPN/NCAA Productions ===
This would be the last year that ESPN would be involved in broadcasting games of the tournament, as CBS took over exclusive coverage of the tournament the following year.

- Bob Carpenter and Clark Kellogg – First round (Indiana–California, Clemson–Brigham Young) at Hartford, Connecticut
- Mike Gorman and Ron Perry – First round (La Salle–Southern Mississippi) at Hartford, Connecticut
- Fred White and Larry Conley – First round (St. John's–Temple, Kansas–Robert Morris) at Atlanta, Georgia
- Ralph Hacker and Dan Belluomini – First round (UCLA–UAB) at Atlanta, Georgia
- Ron Franklin and Bob Ortegel – First round (North Carolina–SW Missouri State, Arkansas–Princeton) at Austin, Texas
- Frank Fallon and Jack Corrigan – First Round (Dayton–Illinois) at Austin, Texas
- Tom Hammond and Gary Thompson – First round (Georgetown–Texas Southern, Georgia–Texas) at Indianapolis, Indiana
- Mick Hubert and Jim Gibbons – First round (Xavier–Kansas State) at Indianapolis, Indiana; First round (Arizona–South Florida) at Long Beach, California
- Mike Patrick and Dan Bonner – First round (Missouri–Northern Iowa, Syracuse–Coppin State) at Richmond, Virginia
- Bob Rathbun and Bucky Waters – First round (Minnesota–UTEP) at Richmond, Virginia
- Bob Rathbun and Mimi Griffin – First round (Virginia–Notre Dame) at Richmond, Virginia
- John Sanders and Bruce Larson – First round (UNLV–Arkansas-Little Rock, Oregon State–Ball State) at Salt Lake City, Utah
- John Rooney and Bob Weltlich – First Round (Michigan St–Murray State, LSU–Villanova) at Knoxville, Tennessee
- Brad Nessler and Jack Givens – First Round (UCSB–Houston, Georgia Tech–East Tennessee State) at Knoxville, Tennessee
- John Sanders and Len Elmore – First round (Louisville–Idaho) at Salt Lake City, Utah
- Barry Tompkins and Mike Rice – First round (Alabama–Colorado State, Michigan–Illinois State) at Long Beach, California

== Tournament notes ==
- Loyola Marymount's Jeff Fryer made 11 of his 15 three-point attempts against Michigan to set the NCAA tournament record.
- Loyola Marymount's 149–115 win over Michigan set a new tournament record for most combined points (264).
- UNLV at the time had the largest accumulated victory margin (112 points), over the entire tournament by a championship team that played 6 games. To date, it is the fifth-largest.
- UNLV's 103–73 win over Duke marked the first (and to date, only) time in the history of the tournament that at least 100 points were scored by one team in the championship game.
- UNLV's 571 points over six games set the record for most points scored by a single team in any one year of the tournament.
- UNLV is the only team in tournament history to average more than 95 points per game, over six games. In six tournament games, they won three by exactly 30 points, while scoring more than 100 points in each 30-point victory.
- UNLV and UCLA in 1965 are the only teams in tournament history to win three games all while scoring at least 100 points in each win. (Loyola Marymount also scored at least 100 points in three games in the 1990 tournament, but lost their last game, where they scored 101 points, to UNLV, by 30 points. UNLV also scored at least 100 points in three victories in the 1977 tournament, but their last one was in the Final Four consolation game.)
- UNLV's 30-point margin of victory in the championship game is also a tournament record. ESPN called it the 36th “worst blowout in sports history.”
- As of 2025, UNLV remains the only team from a non-power conference (AAC, ACC, Big East, Big Ten, Big 12, Pac-12, and SEC) to win the national championship, since Louisville in 1986. Louisville was in the Metro Conference in 1986, which was considered a major basketball conference throughout its history, 1975–1995.)
- The championship game was UNLV's eleventh consecutive win. They would eventually run the win streak to 45 games. That is the fourth-longest win streak in NCAA Division I basketball history, and the longest win streak since the longest ever, by UCLA from 1971 to 1974.

== See also ==
- 1990 NCAA Division II men's basketball tournament
- 1990 NCAA Division III men's basketball tournament
- 1990 NCAA Division I women's basketball tournament
- NCAA Division II women's basketball tournament
- NCAA Division III women's basketball tournament
- 1990 National Invitation Tournament
- National Women's Invitation Tournament
- 1990 NAIA Division I men's basketball tournament
- NAIA Division I women's basketball tournament
