= 1990 ACC men's basketball tournament =

- Classification: Division I
- Season: 1989–90
- Teams: 8
- Site: Charlotte Coliseum; Charlotte, North Carolina
- Champions: Georgia Tech (2nd title)
- Winning coach: Bobby Cremins (2nd title)
- MVP: Brian Oliver (Georgia Tech)
- Television: Raycom/JP Sports

1989–90 ACC men's basketball standings
	Conf.				Overall
Team	W		L	PCT	W		L	PCT
No. 17 Clemson	10	–	4	.714	26	–	9	.743
No. 15 Duke	9	–	5	.643	29	–	9	.763
No. 9 Georgia Tech†	8	–	6	.571	28	–	7	.800
North Carolina	8	–	6	.571	21	–	13	.618
Virginia	6	–	8	.429	20	–	12	.625
NC State	6	–	8	.429	18	–	12	.600
Maryland	6	–	8	.429	19	–	14	.576
Wake Forest	3	–	11	.214	12	–	16	.429
† 1990 ACC tournament winner Rankings from AP Poll

The 1990 Atlantic Coast Conference men's basketball tournament took place in Charlotte, North Carolina, at the second Charlotte Coliseum. Georgia Tech won the tournament, defeating Virginia, 70–61, in the championship game. Brian Oliver of Georgia Tech was named tournament MVP. This was the only time both teams in the ACC Tournament final have been from outside the state of North Carolina until the 2021 ACC finals matchup between Florida State and Georgia Tech.

== Bracket ==
Quarterfinals; March 9
1	#17 Clemson	79
8	Wake Forest	70
4	North Carolina	85
5	Virginia	92^{OT}
2	#12 Duke	104
7	Maryland	84
3	#14 Georgia Tech	76
6	NC State	67

Semifinals; March 10
1	#17 Clemson	66
5	Virginia	69
2	#12 Duke	72
3	#14 Georgia Tech	83

Championship Game; March 11
5	Virginia	61
3	#14 Georgia Tech	70

AP rankings at time of tournament
