= 1989–90 Notre Dame Fighting Irish men's basketball team =

American college basketball season

1989–90 Notre Dame Fighting Irish men's basketball
- Conference: Independent
- Record: 16–13
- Head coach: Digger Phelps (19th season)
- Assistant coach: Fran McCaffery (2nd season)
- Home arena: Joyce Center

1989–90 NCAA Division I men's basketball independents standings
	Conf.				Overall
Team	W		L	PCT	W		L	PCT
Wright State		–		–	21	–	7	.750
Northern Illinois		–		–	17	–	11	.607
Akron		–		–	16	–	12	.571
DePaul		–		–	20	–	15	.571
Notre Dame		–		–	16	–	13	.552
Miami (FL)		–		–	13	–	15	.464
UMKC		–		–	13	–	15	.464
Southern Utah		–		–	13	–	15	.464
UMBC		–		–	12	–	16	.429
U.S. International		–		–	12	–	16	.429
Liberty		–		–	11	–	17	.393
Youngstown State		–		–	8	–	20	.286
Brooklyn		–		–	7	–	21	.250
Central Florida		–		–	7	–	21	.250
Florida International		–		–	7	–	21	.250
Central Connecticut State		–		–	6	–	22	.214
Chicago State		–		–	6	–	22	.214
Nicholls State		–		–	4	–	23	.148
Davidson		–		–	4	–	24	.143
Rankings from AP Poll

The 1989–90 Notre Dame Fighting Irish men's basketball team represented the University of Notre Dame during the 1989-90 college basketball season. The Irish were led by head coach Digger Phelps, in his 19th season. They finished with an overall record of 16–13. Notre Dame received an at large bid to the 1990 NCAA Tournament as a #10 seed. In the first round Notre Dame lost to Virginia 75–67.

== Roster ==
1989–90 Notre Dame Fighting Irish men's basketball team
Players
Coaches

Pos.	#	Name	Height	Weight	Year	Hometown
F	3	Monty Williams	6 ft 8 in (2.03 m)	215 lb (98 kg)	Fr	Fredericksburg, Virginia
PG	12	Elmer Bennett	6 ft 0 in (1.83 m)	160 lb (73 kg)	So	Bellaire, Texas
PF	20	LaPhonso Ellis	6 ft 8 in (2.03 m)	225 lb (102 kg)	So	East St. Louis, Illinois
C	43	Keith Tower	6 ft 11 in (2.11 m)	240 lb (109 kg)	So	Coraopolis, Pennsylvania

Head coach

- Digger Phelps (Rider)

Assistant coach(es)

Legend

- (C) Team captain
- (S) Suspended
- (I) Ineligible
- (W) Walk-on
- Injured
- Current redshirt

== Schedule and results ==
Date time, TV	Rank^{#}	Opponent^{#}	Result	Record	Site city, state
Regular Season
Nov 28, 1989*		San Francisco	W 84–64	1–0	Joyce Center; Notre Dame, Indiana
Dec 2, 1989*		vs. No. 13 Louisville	L 73–84	1–1	
Dec 5, 1989*		at No. 14 Indiana	L 72–81	1–2	Assembly Hall; Bloomington, Indiana
Dec 9, 1989*		at Marquette	L 68–80	1–3	Bradley Center; Milwaukee, Wisconsin
Dec 17, 1989*		No. 13 UCLA	W 86–84	2–3	Joyce Center; Notre Dame, Indiana
Dec 21, 1989*		Valparaiso	W 97–70	3–3	Joyce Center; Notre Dame, Indiana
Dec 22, 1989*		Lafayette	W 86–71	4–3	Joyce Center; Notre Dame, Indiana
Dec 30, 1989*		Butler	W 97–65	5–3	Joyce Center; Notre Dame, Indiana
Jan 3, 1990*		at Creighton	L 75–77	5–4	Omaha Civic Auditorium; Omaha, Nebraska
Jan 6, 1990*		at Southern California	W 86–81	6–4	L.A. Sports Arena; Los Angeles, California
Jan 9, 1990*		at Boston College	W 80–67	7–4	Silvio O. Conte Forum; Boston, Massachusetts
Jan 12, 1990*		at No. 21 La Salle	L 78–86	7–5	Convention Hall; Philadelphia, Pennsylvania
Jan 16, 1990*		vs. Rutgers	W 74–69	8–5	
Jan 20, 1990*		vs. No. 13 LSU	L 64–87	8–6	Louisiana Superdome; New Orleans, Louisiana
Jan 24, 1990*		Wichita State	W 88–78	9–6	Joyce Center; Notre Dame, Indiana
Jan 27, 1990*		Miami (FL)	W 107–60	10–6	Joyce Center; Notre Dame, Indiana
Jan 30, 1990*		Dayton	W 97–79	11–6	Joyce Center; Notre Dame, Indiana
Feb 4, 1990*		at No. 5 Duke	L 76–88	11–7	Cameron Indoor Stadium; Durham, North Carolina
Feb 8, 1990*		at Southern Methodist	W 63–49	12–7	Moody Coliseum; Dallas, Texas
Feb 10, 1990*		at Houston	L 82–93	12–8	Hofheinz Pavilion; Houston, Texas
Feb 14, 1990*		Marquette	W 79–76	13–8	Joyce Center; Notre Dame, Indiana
Feb 17, 1990*		at No. 4 Syracuse	W 66–65	14–8	Carrier Dome; Syracuse, New York
Feb 20, 1990*		DePaul	L 62–63	14–9	Joyce Center; Notre Dame, Indiana
Feb 25, 1990*		No. 8 Georgia Tech	L 80–88	14–10	Joyce Center; Notre Dame, Indiana
Feb 28, 1990*		at Dayton	L 79–97	14–11	University of Dayton Arena; Dayton, Ohio
Mar 3, 1990*		No. 3 Missouri	W 98–67	15–11	Joyce Center; Notre Dame, Indiana
Mar 5, 1990*		Kentucky	W 80–67	16–11	Joyce Center; Notre Dame, Indiana
Mar 10, 1990*		at DePaul	L 59–64	16–12	Rosemont Horizon; Rosemont, Illinois
NCAA tournament
Mar 16, 1990*	(10 SE)	vs. (7 SE) Virginia; First Round	L 67–75	16–13	Richmond Coliseum; Richmond, Virginia
*Non-conference game. ^{#}Rankings from AP Poll/UPI Poll. (#) Tournament seedings in parentheses.
