= Kenny Anderson (basketball) =

American basketball player (born 1970)

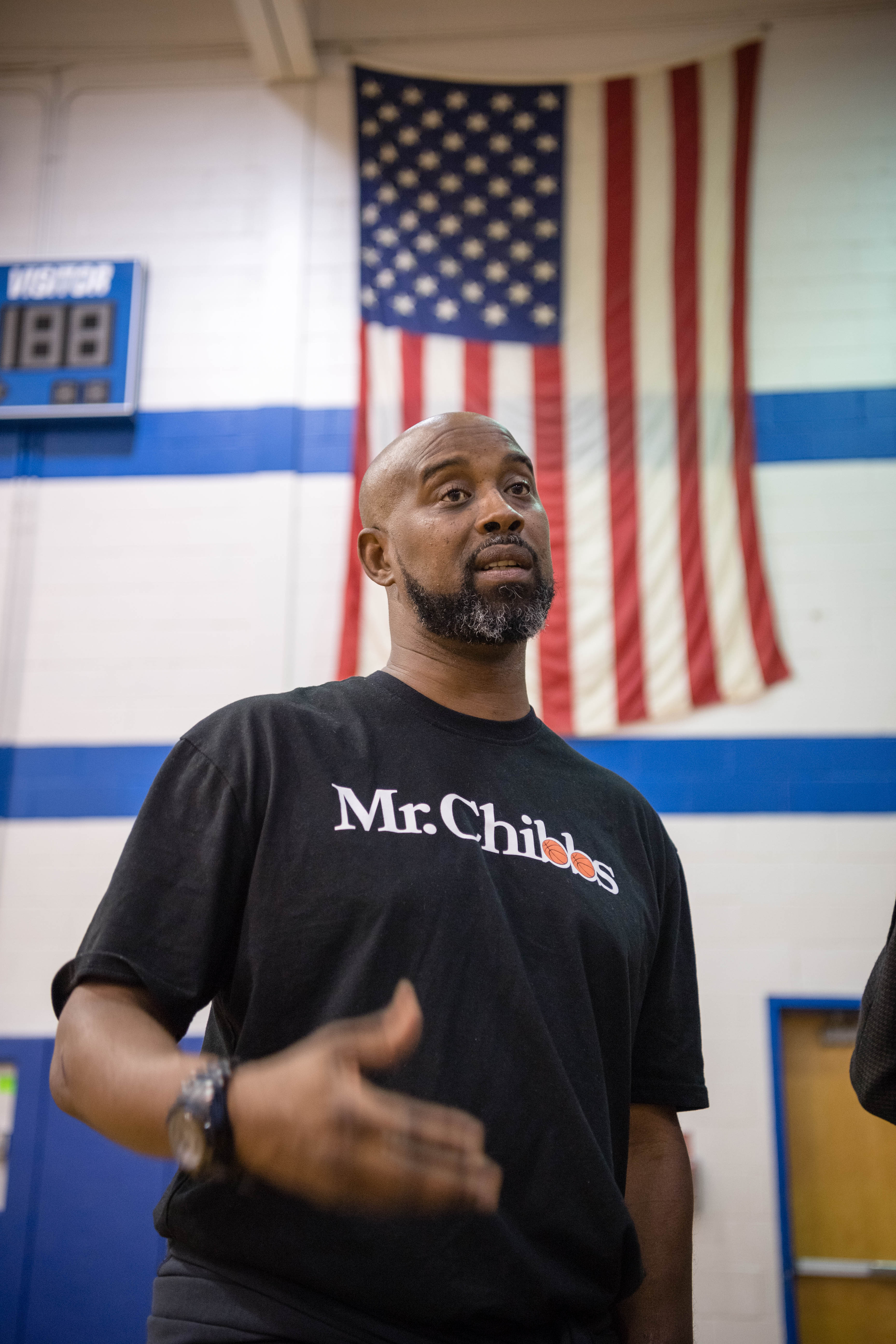
- Anderson in 2017

Florida Coastal Prep
- Title: Mentor and leadership trainer

Personal information
- Born: October 9, 1970 (age 56) Queens, New York, U.S.
- Listed height: 6 ft 1 in (1.85 m)
- Listed weight: 168 lb (76 kg)

Career information
- High school: Archbishop Molloy (Queens, New York)
- College: Georgia Tech (1989–1991)
- NBA draft: 1991: 1st round, 2nd overall pick
- Drafted by: New Jersey Nets
- Playing career: 1991–2006
- Position: Point guard
- Number: 7, 12, 17, 13
- Coaching career: 2007–2008, 2018–present

Career history

Playing
- 1991–1996: New Jersey Nets
- 1996: Charlotte Hornets
- 1996–1998: Portland Trail Blazers
- 1998–2002: Boston Celtics
- 2002–2003: Seattle SuperSonics
- 2003: New Orleans Hornets
- 2003–2004: Indiana Pacers
- 2004–2005: Atlanta Hawks
- 2005: Los Angeles Clippers
- 2005–2006: Žalgiris Kaunas

Coaching
- 2007–2008: Atlanta Krunk
- 2018–2024: Fisk
- 2025–present: Florida Coastal Prep

Career highlights
- NBA All-Star (1994); Consensus first-team All-American (1991); Second-team All-American – NABC (1990); Third-team All-American – AP (1990); 2× First-team All-ACC (1990, 1991); ACC Rookie of the Year (1990); National high school player of the year (1989); Mr. New York Basketball (1989); McDonald's All-American (1989); 2× First-team Parade All-American (1988, 1989); Second-team Parade All-American (1987)

Career NBA statistics
- Points: 10,789 (12.6 ppg)
- Rebounds: 2,641 (3.1 rpg)
- Assists: 5,196 (6.1 apg)
- Stats at NBA.com
- Stats at Basketball Reference
Medals
Men's basketball
Representing the United States
FIBA World Championship
| Bronze medal – third place | 1990 Buenos Aires | National team |
Goodwill Games
| Silver medal – second place | 1990 Seattle | National team |

Kenneth Anderson (born October 9, 1970) is an American former professional basketball player. After a college career at Georgia Tech, he played point guard professionally from 1991 to 2006, mostly in the National Basketball Association.

== Early life ==
Anderson was born in Queens, New York City. As a 16-year-old high school sophomore, the LeFrak City, Queens native who attended academic and athletic powerhouse Archbishop Molloy High School in Briarwood, Queens, was considered one of the best basketball prospects in America. Collegiate recruiters began scouting Anderson in sixth grade and he was on the front page of the New York City sports section when he was 14.

By the end of his high school career, he was a four-time Parade All-American, a feat not accomplished since Lew Alcindor, and the first player to be named All-City four times. He was a McDonald's All-American, was named New York State Mr. Basketball by the New York State Coaches Organization, and named High School Basketball Player of the Year by Gatorade, the New York State Sportswriters Association, Parade, Naismith, and USA Today Despite his coach, Jack Curran, benching him for the first quarter of all of his games during his freshman year at Molloy, Anderson set the all-time state record for scoring in New York, with 2,621 points. This record stood until 2004, when Lincoln High School guard Sebastian Telfair eclipsed the mark late in his senior season. He was considered the No. 1 player in the country, over such notables as Jimmy Jackson and Shaquille O'Neal.

== College career ==
After a long recruiting process, Anderson signed a letter of intent in November 1988 to play at Georgia Tech, selecting the Yellow Jackets over North Carolina, Duke, and Syracuse.

Anderson played two years for Georgia Tech as the team's starting point guard, helping lead the team to the Final Four in 1990, along with swingmen Dennis Scott and Brian Oliver. The trio was nicknamed "Lethal Weapon 3". Despite winning the ACC title, they entered the NCAA tourney as only the fourth seed. They proceeded to sweep through the LSU Tigers, led by Shaquille O'Neal, and two Big 10 teams on their way to the Final Four. Georgia Tech's tournament run ended against eventual champions UNLV in the Final Four.

With Scott and Oliver gone after that season, Anderson averaged nearly 26 points per game. Georgia Tech secured a No. 8 seed for the 1991 NCAA tournament, where they lost in the second round to Ohio State. Soon after, Anderson announced that he would forgo his last two years of eligibility to enter the NBA draft.

== Professional career ==
=== New Jersey Nets (1991–1996) ===
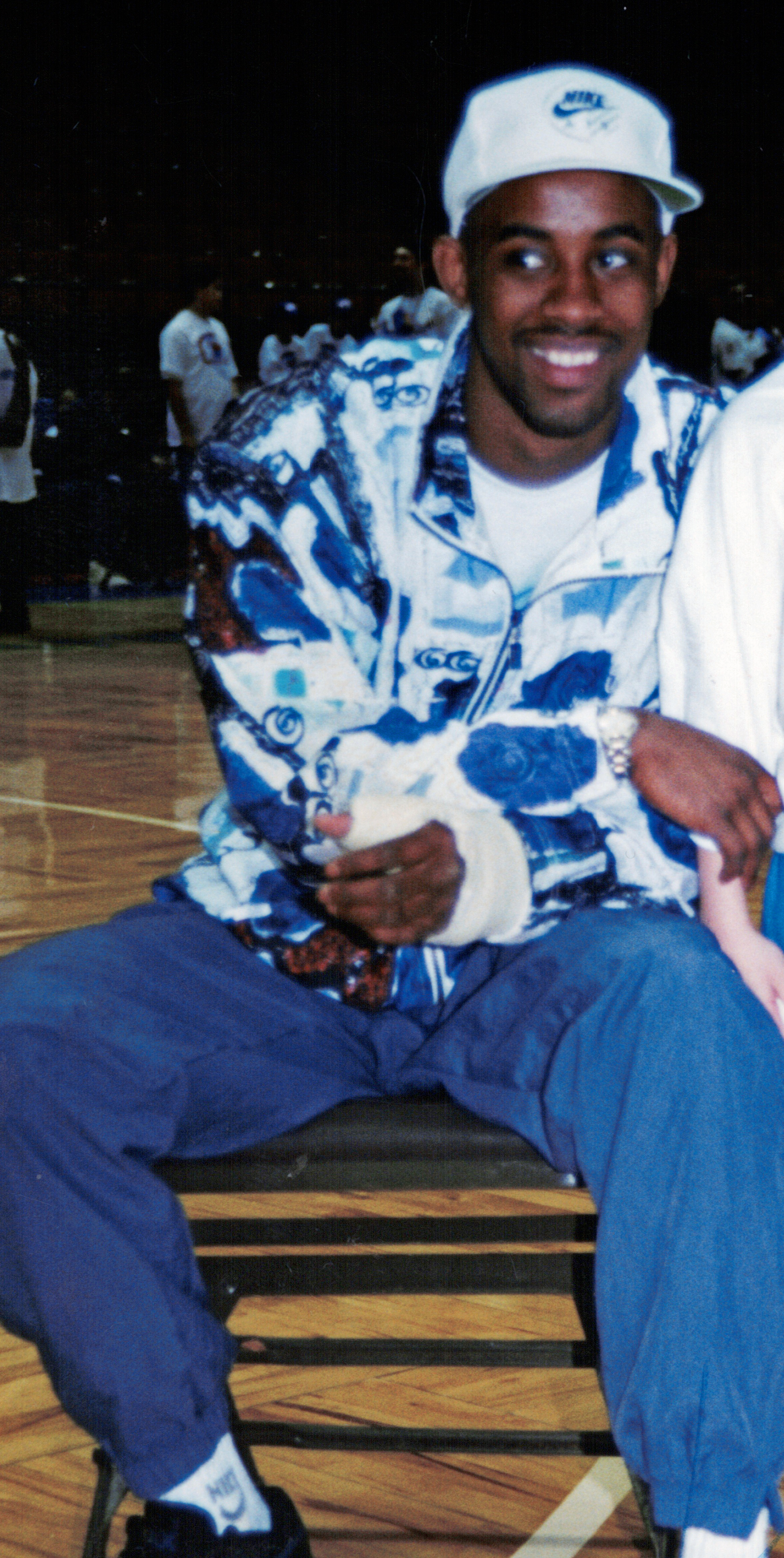
Anderson poses with a fan while recovering from a broken wrist, circa March/April 1993

Anderson was selected by the New Jersey Nets with the second pick in the 1991 NBA draft. He was the youngest player in the league in his rookie year, and averaged seven points, two rebounds, and 3.2 assists per game. During Anderson's second season he nearly doubled his point, rebound, and assist averages en route to the Nets making the 1993 NBA playoffs. While in New Jersey, coached by Chuck Daly, Anderson formed what was widely expected to become a "big three" of sorts with Derrick Coleman and Dražen Petrović. However, Petrović's 1993 death in a car accident prevented this from coming to fruition. In his third season, he averaged career highs of 18.8 points and 9.6 assists per game. That season, on February 18, 1994, Anderson scored 42 points and recorded 12 assists during a 110–113 win over the Washington Bullets and, April 15, 1994, Anderson scored a career-high 45 points and recorded 14 assists against Detroit Pistons. That same season, Anderson and teammate Coleman represented the East squad in the 1994 NBA All-Star Game.

=== Charlotte Hornets (1996) ===
He was traded to the Charlotte Hornets in 1996, along with Gerald Glass, in a deal for Khalid Reeves and Kendall Gill. Anderson played only 38 games in the 1996 season for the Hornets after the midseason trade, averaging 15.2 points.

=== Portland Trail Blazers (1997–1998) ===
In 1996, Anderson signed with the Portland Trail Blazers. During the 1997 NBA playoffs, Anderson averaged 17 points, 4.8 assists, and 4.3 rebounds per game during Portland's first-round loss to the Los Angeles Lakers.

=== Boston Celtics (1998–2002) ===
In 1998, the Trail Blazers traded Anderson, along with Alvin Williams, Gary Trent, and two 1998 first-round picks to the Toronto Raptors for Damon Stoudamire, Carlos Rogers, Walt Williams, and a 1998 second-round pick, but he refused to report to the team because he did not want to play in Canada, which prompted the Raptors to trade him to the Boston Celtics five days later, along with Žan Tabak and Popeye Jones for John Thomas, Roy Rogers, Chauncey Billups, and Dee Brown.

=== Seattle SuperSonics (2003) ===
In 2003, Anderson was traded to the Seattle SuperSonics, along with Vitaly Potapenko and Joseph Forte, and in a package for Vin Baker and Shammond Williams.

=== New Orleans Hornets (2003) ===
At the 2003 NBA trade deadline, Anderson was dealt back to the Hornets, who had since relocated to New Orleans, for Elden Campbell.

=== Indiana Pacers (2004) ===
On September 19, 2003, Anderson signed a contract with the Indiana Pacers. Anderson played 44 games as a member of the Pacers, averaging six points per game.

=== Atlanta Hawks (2005) ===
On September 16, 2004, Anderson signed a contract with the Atlanta Hawks. He was waived by the Hawks on February 24, 2005.

=== Los Angeles Clippers (2005) ===
On February 28, 2005, Anderson was claimed off waivers by the Los Angeles Clippers after being waived by the Hawks. He was later waived by the Clippers on March 25, 2005.

=== Post-NBA ===
Anderson was released from Lithuania's Žalgiris Kaunas after the 2005–06 season, thus ending his professional career as a basketball player.

== National team career ==
Anderson played for the U.S. national team in the 1990 FIBA World Championship, where they won the bronze medal. His play was instrumental for the United States and included 34 points performance in their 107–105 comeback overtime win against Puerto Rico in the bronze medal game. For his effort he was named to the All-Tournament Team which included Vlade Divac, Toni Kukoč, Oscar Schmidt and Fico Lopez.

== Personal life ==
Anderson was raised by his mother, Joan, and did not meet his father until he was in his thirties. He has two sisters, Sandra and Danielle. He was poor growing up, but Anderson says that being able to provide for his mother was inspiration for him to become a professional basketball player. In October 2005, his mother died from a heart attack.

Anderson is the father of seven children, by five women. He became a father of a daughter, Danielle while attending Georgia Tech. He had a relationship with Dee Dee Roper (DJ Spinderella of the rap group Salt-N-Pepa), and they have daughter Christy together. Christy later appeared on an episode of My Super Sweet 16.

He was married to Tami Roman (who has appeared on the reality series Basketball Wives), but they divorced. They have two daughters, Lyric and hip-hop artist Jazz Anderson.

Anderson met his second wife Tamiyka R Lockhart in West Los Angeles in 1998 while they both were going through divorces. They have a son together, Kenneth Anderson Jr. They divorced in 2004. During this marriage he had another son born to his mistress Suny Castro also named Kenneth Anderson Jr.

He met his third wife, Natasha, during the 2004 NBA playoffs. They married in 2007. Anderson and Natasha are raising his son Kenny Jr. and her daughter Tiana.

In 2005, despite earning $63 million during his NBA career, Anderson filed for bankruptcy.

In December 2011, he was arrested after crashing into two trees and fleeing the scene. No one was injured, and he was not charged with DUI, although he was charged with leaving the scene.

On 27 April 2013, he was arrested in Florida for drunk driving.

In 2013, Anderson reported that he was sexually abused as a child by both a person who lived in his neighborhood and a basketball coach.

In February 2019, Anderson was hospitalized for several days near his home of Pembroke Pines, Florida after suffering a stroke.

== After the NBA ==
In 2007, Anderson was named as the coach of the Continental Basketball Association's Atlanta Krunk. He accumulated a 9–19 record during the 2007–08 season.

In 2008, Anderson made a TV appearance on Pros vs Joes.

In September 2008, he was inducted into the New York City Basketball Hall of Fame.

In 2008, he became the head coach of slamball team Hombres, and helped them to a semi-finals berth.

Anderson graduated in 2010 from St. Thomas University in Miami, with a degree in organizational leadership.

In August 2011, Anderson took the position of basketball coach at the David Posnack Jewish Day School in Davie, Florida. In May 2013, following a DUI arrest, the school indicated that they would not renew his contract.

In 2014, Anderson was named to a team assembled by Dennis Rodman as part of his "basketball diplomacy" effort in North Korea with the job of playing an exhibition match against the North Korean Senior National Team to celebrate the birthday of Kim Jong-un. Anderson later said that upon arrival, he felt he had let down friends, family and fans but also had no choice but to go through with the event. He said he would donate some of his earnings, which were not paid by the regime, to charity.

In 2015, Anderson appeared in Dwayne Johnson's reality TV show Wake Up Call.

In 2017, Anderson appeared in Mr. Chibbs, directed by Jill Campbell. This documentary tracked Anderson's life post basketball as he came to terms with personal demons in his life.

In 2018, Anderson was hired as the head basketball coach for Fisk University.

Following his tenure at Fisk, Anderson became a mentor and leadership trainer at Florida Coastal Prep in Fort Walton Beach, Florida, where he works directly with players on ball-handling, shooting mechanics, court vision, and the mental aspects of the game.

== NBA career statistics ==
Legend
| GP | Games played | GS | Games started | MPG | Minutes per game |
| FG% | Field goal percentage | 3P% | 3-point field goal percentage | FT% | Free throw percentage |
| RPG | Rebounds per game | APG | Assists per game | SPG | Steals per game |
| BPG | Blocks per game | PPG | Points per game | **Bold** | Career high |
| * | Led the league |

=== Regular season ===
| Year | Team | GP | GS | MPG | FG% | 3P% | FT% | RPG | APG | SPG | BPG | PPG |
|---|---|---|---|---|---|---|---|---|---|---|---|---|
| 1991–92 | New Jersey | 64 | 13 | 17.0 | .390 | .231 | .745 | 2.0 | 3.2 | 1.0 | 0.1 | 7.0 |
| 1992–93 | New Jersey | 55 | 55 | 36.5 | .435 | .280 | .776 | 4.1 | 8.2 | 1.7 | 0.2 | 16.9 |
| 1993–94 | New Jersey | **82*** | **82*** | **38.2** | .417 | .303 | .818 | 3.9 | **9.6** | 1.9 | 0.2 | **18.8** |
| 1994–95 | New Jersey | 72 | 70 | 37.3 | .399 | .330 | **.841** | 3.5 | 9.4 | 1.4 | 0.2 | 17.6 |
| 1995–96 | New Jersey | 31 | 28 | 33.6 | .376 | .364 | .803 | 3.3 | 8.0 | 1.7 | **0.3** | 15.3 |
| 1995–96 | Charlotte | 38 | 36 | 34.3 | **.454** | .357 | .727 | 2.7 | 8.6 | 1.6 | 0.2 | 15.2 |
| 1996–97 | Portland | **82** | 81 | 37.6 | .427 | .361 | .768 | **4.4** | 7.1 | **2.0** | 0.2 | 17.5 |
| 1997–98 | Portland | 45 | 40 | 32.7 | .387 | .353 | .772 | 3.0 | 5.4 | 1.4 | 0.0 | 12.6 |
| 1997–98 | Boston | 16 | 16 | 24.1 | .435 | .370 | .837 | 2.4 | 6.3 | 1.6 | 0.0 | 11.2 |
| 1998–99 | Boston | 34 | 33 | 29.7 | .451 | .250 | .832 | 3.0 | 5.7 | 1.0 | 0.1 | 12.1 |
| 1999–00 | Boston | **82** | **82*** | 31.6 | .440 | .386 | .775 | 2.7 | 5.1 | 1.7 | 0.1 | 14.0 |
| 2000–01 | Boston | 33 | 28 | 25.7 | .388 | .333 | .831 | 2.2 | 4.1 | 1.3 | 0.1 | 7.5 |
| 2001–02 | Boston | 76 | 76 | 32.0 | .436 | .273 | .742 | 3.6 | 5.3 | 1.9 | 0.1 | 9.6 |
| 2002–03 | Seattle | 38 | 1 | 18.1 | .440 | .000 | .829 | 2.3 | 3.2 | 1.1 | 0.0 | 6.1 |
| 2002–03 | New Orleans | 23 | 1 | 19.4 | .407 | **.500** | .727 | 2.0 | 3.3 | 0.8 | 0.2 | 6.0 |
| 2003–04 | Indiana | 44 | 31 | 20.6 | .441 | .250 | .729 | 1.8 | 2.8 | 0.6 | 0.1 | 6.0 |
| 2004–05 | Atlanta | 39 | 20 | 18.4 | .426 | .462 | .730 | 2.1 | 2.5 | 0.8 | 0.0 | 5.0 |
| 2004–05 | L.A. Clippers | 4 | 0 | 6.5 | .364 | – | – | 1.3 | 1.3 | 0.0 | 0.0 | 2.0 |
| Career | | 858 | 693 | 30.1 | .421 | .346 | .790 | 3.1 | 6.1 | 1.5 | 0.1 | 12.6 |
| All-Star | | 1 | 1 | 16.0 | .300 | .000 | – | 4.0 | 3.0 | 0.0 | 0.0 | 6.0 |

=== Playoffs ===
| Year | Team | GP | GS | MPG | FG% | 3P% | FT% | RPG | APG | SPG | BPG | PPG |
|---|---|---|---|---|---|---|---|---|---|---|---|---|
| 1992 | New Jersey | 3 | 0 | 8.0 | .333 | – | **1.000** | 1.0 | 1.0 | 0.3 | 0.0 | 2.7 |
| 1994 | New Jersey | 4 | 4 | **45.3** | .352 | **.300** | .667 | 3.0 | **6.8** | **2.3** | 0.0 | 15.8 |
| 1997 | Portland | 4 | 4 | 42.3 | **.478** | .263 | .950 | **4.3** | 4.8 | 1.8 | **0.3** | **17.0** |
| 2002 | Boston | **16** | **16** | 35.0 | .416 | – | .800 | 3.1 | 4.8 | 1.3 | 0.0 | 12.0 |
| 2003 | New Orleans | 5 | 0 | 10.2 | .333 | – | **1.000** | 0.4 | 1.8 | 0.6 | 0.0 | 2.2 |
| 2004 | Indiana | 4 | 0 | 4.8 | .286 | – | – | 0.3 | 0.3 | 0.3 | 0.0 | 1.0 |
| Career | | 36 | 24 | 27.9 | .406 | .276 | .796 | 2.4 | 3.8 | 1.2 | 0.0 | 9.6 |

== College statistics ==
Legend
| GP | Games played | GS | Games started | MPG | Minutes per game |
| FG% | Field goal percentage | 3P% | 3-point field goal percentage | FT% | Free throw percentage |
| RPG | Rebounds per game | APG | Assists per game | SPG | Steals per game |
| BPG | Blocks per game | PPG | Points per game | **Bold** | Career high |

| Year | Team | GP | GS | MPG | FG% | 3P% | FT% | RPG | APG | SPG | BPG | PPG |
|---|---|---|---|---|---|---|---|---|---|---|---|---|
| 1989–90 | Georgia Tech | **35** | **35** | 37.7 | **.515** | **.410** | .733 | 5.5 | **8.1** | 2.3 | **0.1** | 20.6 |
| 1990–91 | Georgia Tech | 30 | 29 | **38.9** | .437 | .351 | **.829** | **5.7** | 5.6 | **3.0** | **0.1** | **25.9** |
| Career | | 65 | 64 | 38.3 | .473 | .374 | .787 | 5.6 | 7.0 | 2.6 | 0.1 | 23.0 |
