= 1989–90 Georgia Tech Yellow Jackets men's basketball team =

American college basketball season

1989–90 Georgia Tech Yellow Jackets men's basketball

Kuppenheimer Classic Champions ACC tournament champions

NCAA tournament, Final Four
- Conference: Atlantic Coast Conference

Ranking
- Coaches: No. 7
- AP: No. 9
- Record: 28–7 (8–6 ACC)
- Head coach: Bobby Cremins (9th season)
- Assistant coaches: Kevin Cantwell (4th season); Sherman Dillard (2nd season); Jimmy Hebron (9th season)
- Home arena: Alexander Memorial Coliseum

1989–90 ACC men's basketball standings
	Conf.				Overall
Team	W		L	PCT	W		L	PCT
No. 17 Clemson	10	–	4	.714	26	–	9	.743
No. 15 Duke	9	–	5	.643	29	–	9	.763
No. 9 Georgia Tech†	8	–	6	.571	28	–	7	.800
North Carolina	8	–	6	.571	21	–	13	.618
Virginia	6	–	8	.429	20	–	12	.625
NC State	6	–	8	.429	18	–	12	.600
Maryland	6	–	8	.429	19	–	14	.576
Wake Forest	3	–	11	.214	12	–	16	.429
† 1990 ACC tournament winner Rankings from AP Poll

The 1989–90 Georgia Tech Yellow Jackets men's basketball team represented the Georgia Institute of Technology during the 1989–90 NCAA men's basketball season. Led by 9th year head coach Bobby Cremins and the talented trio dubbed "Lethal Weapon 3" – ACC Player of the Year Dennis Scott, National Freshman of the Year Kenny Anderson, and Brian Oliver – the Yellow Jackets were ACC tournament champions and reached the 1990 Final Four.

== Roster ==
1989–90 Georgia Tech Yellow Jackets men's basketball team
Players
Coaches

Pos.	#	Name	Height	Weight	Year	Hometown
G	12	Kenny Anderson	6 ft 2 in (1.88 m)	166 lb (75 kg)	Fr	Rego Park, New York
F	15	Darryl Barnes	6 ft 8 in (2.03 m)	202 lb (92 kg)	Fr	Brooklyn, New York
G	34	Rod Belanis (redshirt)	6 ft 3 in (1.91 m)	192 lb (87 kg)	Fr	Williamsburg, Virginia
G	23	Brian Black (redshirt)	6 ft 1 in (1.85 m)	178 lb (81 kg)	Fr	Marietta, Georgia
G	5	Karl Brown	6 ft 2 in (1.88 m)	187 lb (85 kg)	Sr	Leicester, England
G	3	Brian Domalik	5 ft 11 in (1.8 m)	164 lb (74 kg)	Jr	Leesburg, Virginia
C	52	Matt Geiger (redshirt)	7 ft 0 in (2.13 m)	235 lb (107 kg)		Clearwater, Florida
F	32	Malcolm Mackey	6 ft 10 in (2.08 m)	243 lb (110 kg)	Fr	Chattanooga, Tennessee
F/C	44	Johnny McNeil	6 ft 9 in (2.06 m)	233 lb (106 kg)	Sr	High Point, North Carolina
C	24	James Munlyn	6 ft 11 in (2.11 m)	228 lb (103 kg)	Jr	Aiken, South Carolina
F	33	Ivano Newbill (redshirt)	6 ft 9 in (2.06 m)	224 lb (102 kg)	Fr	Macon, Georgia
G	13	Brian Oliver	6 ft 4 in (1.93 m)	211 lb (96 kg)	Sr	Smyrna, Georgia
G/F	4	Dennis Scott	6 ft 8 in (2.03 m)	229 lb (104 kg)	Jr	Reston, Virginia
G	14	Greg White	6 ft 2 in (1.88 m)	168 lb (76 kg)	So	Norcross, Georgia

Head coach

- Bobby Cremins (South Carolina)

Assistant coach(es)

- Kevin Cantwell
- Sherman Dillard
- Jimmy Hebron

Legend

- (C) Team captain
- (S) Suspended
- (I) Ineligible
- (W) Walk-on
- Injured
- Current redshirt

== Schedule ==
Date time, TV	Rank^{#}	Opponent^{#}	Result	Record	Site city, state
Non-conference regular season
11/21/1989*	No. 22	Georgia State	W 108-83	1-0	Alexander Memorial Coliseum; Atlanta, GA
11/21/1989*	No. 21	Richmond	W 87-74	2-0	Alexander Memorial Coliseum; Atlanta, GA
12/4/1989*	No. 21	vs. No. 18 Pittsburgh; ACC–Big East Challenge	W 93-92	3-0	Hartford Civic Center; Hartford, CT
12/11/1989*	No. 18	North Carolina A&T Aggies	W 101-87	4-0	Alexander Memorial Coliseum; Atlanta, GA
12/16/1989*	No. 15	vs. Georgia; Rivalry	W 92-89	5-0	The Omni; Atlanta, GA
12/19/1989*	No. 14	Coastal Carolina	W 109-82	6-0	Alexander Memorial Coliseum; Atlanta, GA
12/27/1989*	No. 14	vs. Morehead State; Kuppenheimer Classic	W 98-76	7-0	The Omni; Atlanta, GA
12/28/1989*	No. 14	vs. Pittsburgh; Kuppenheimer Classic	W 111-92	8-0	The Omni; Atlanta, GA
1/2/1990*	No. 12	Marist	W 86-77	9-0	Alexander Memorial Coliseum; Atlanta, GA
ACC regular season
1/6/1990	No. 12	at Wake Forest	W 91-79	10-0 (1-0)	Lawrence Joel Coliseum; Winston-Salem, NC
1/11/1990	No. 9	No. 10 Duke	L 91-96	10-1 (1-1)	Alexander Memorial Coliseum; Atlanta, GA
1/13/1990	No. 9	No. 17 NC State	W 92-85	11-1 (2-1)	Alexander Memorial Coliseum; Atlanta, GA
1/16/1990*	No. 11	Temple	W 59-57	12-1	Alexander Memorial Coliseum; Atlanta, GA
1/21/1990	No. 11	at Virginia	L 79-81	12-2 (2-2)	University Hall; Charlottesville, VA
1/25/1990	No. 13	at Clemson	L 90-91	12-3 (2-3)	Littlejohn Coliseum; Clemson, SC
1/28/1990	No. 13	at No. 8 Duke	L 86-88	12-4 (2-4)	Cameron Indoor Stadium; Durham, NC
2/1/1990	No. 17	No. 25 North Carolina	W 102-75	13-4 (3-4)	Alexander Memorial Coliseum; Atlanta, GA
2/3/1990	No. 17	at Maryland	W 90-84	14-4 (4-4)	Cole Fieldhouse; College Park, MD
2/7/1990	No. 16	Wake Forest	W 79-70	15-4 (5-4)	Alexander Memorial Coliseum; Atlanta, GA
2/10/1990*	No. 16	at No. 15 Louisville	W 94-84	16-4	Freedom Hall; Louisville, KY
2/13/1990	No. 13	Maryland	W 80-78	17-4 (6-4)	Alexander Memorial Coliseum; Atlanta, GA
2/15/1990*	No. 16	vs. Fordham	W 83-78	18-4	Madison Square Garden; New York, NY
2/17/1990	No. 13	at NC State	W 95-92	19-4 (7-4)	Reynolds Coliseum; Raleigh, NC
2/22/1990	No. 8	Virginia	L 71-73	19-5 (7-5)	Alexander Memorial Coliseum; Atlanta, GA
2/25/1990*	No. 8	at Notre Dame	W 88-80	20-5	Purcell Pavilion at The Joyce Center; South Bend, IN
2/28/1990	No. 11	at North Carolina	L 79-81	20-6 (7-6)	Dean Smith Center; Chapel Hill, NC
3/3/1990	No. 12	No. 20 Clemson	W 85-69	21-6 (8-6)	Alexander Memorial Coliseum; Atlanta, GA
ACC tournament
3/9/1990*	No. 14	vs. NC State; ACC Tournament Quarterfinal	W 76-67	22-6 (8-6)	Charlotte Coliseum; Charlotte, NC
3/10/1990*	No. 14	vs. No. 12 Duke; ACC Tournament Semifinal	W 83-72	23-6 (8-6)	Charlotte Coliseum; Charlotte, NC
3/11/1990*	No. 14	vs. Virginia; ACC tournament championship	W 70-61	24-6 (8-6)	Charlotte Coliseum; Charlotte, NC
NCAA tournament
3/15/1990; CBS	(4 SE) No. 9	vs. (13 SE) East Tennessee State; NCAA Tournament Round of 64	W 99-83	25-6 (8-6)	Knoxville, TN; Thompson–Boling Arena
3/17/1990; CBS	(4 SE) No. 9	vs. (5 SE) No. 19 LSU; NCAA Tournament Round of 32	W 94-91	26-6 (8-6)	Knoxville, TN; Thompson–Boling Arena
3/23/1990; CBS	(4 SE) No. 9	vs. (1 SE) No. 3 Michigan State; Southeast Regional semifinal	W 81-80 ^{OT}	27-6 (8-6)	New Orleans, LA; Louisiana Superdome
3/25/1990; CBS	(4 SE) No. 9	vs. (6 SE) No. 20 Minnesota; Southeast Regional final	W 93-91	28-6 (8-6)	New Orleans, LA; Louisiana Superdome
3/31/1990; CBS	(4 SE) No. 9	vs. (1 W) No. 2 UNLV; NCAA Final Four - National semifinal	L 81-90	28-7 (8-6)	McNichols Sports Arena; Denver, CO
*Non-conference game. ^{#}Rankings from AP Poll. (#) Tournament seedings in parentheses.

== Awards ==
All-Americans

- Dennis Scott – Consensus 2nd Team
- Kenny Anderson – 3rd Team (AP), 2nd Team (NABC)

Wayman Tisdale Award (National Freshman of the Year)

- Kenny Anderson

Naismith College Coach of the Year

- Bobby Cremins

ACC Player of the Year

- Dennis Scott

ACC Rookie of the Year

- Kenny Anderson

== Players in the 1990 NBA draft ==
Round	Pick	Player	NBA club
1	4	Dennis Scott	Orlando Magic
