= 1989–90 NC State Wolfpack men's basketball team =

American college basketball season

1989–90 NC State Wolfpack men's basketball
- Conference: Atlantic Coast Conference
- Record: 18–12 (6–8 ACC)
- Head coach: Jim Valvano (10th season)
- Home arena: Reynolds Coliseum

1989–90 ACC men's basketball standings
| | Conf. | | | | Overall |
| Team | W | | L | PCT | W | | L | PCT |
|---|---|---|---|---|---|---|---|---|
| No. 17 Clemson | 10 | – | 4 | .714 | 26 | – | 9 | .743 |
| No. 15 Duke | 9 | – | 5 | .643 | 29 | – | 9 | .763 |
| No. 9 Georgia Tech† | 8 | – | 6 | .571 | 28 | – | 7 | .800 |
| North Carolina | 8 | – | 6 | .571 | 21 | – | 13 | .618 |
| Virginia | 6 | – | 8 | .429 | 20 | – | 12 | .625 |
| NC State | 6 | – | 8 | .429 | 18 | – | 12 | .600 |
| Maryland | 6 | – | 8 | .429 | 19 | – | 14 | .576 |
| Wake Forest | 3 | – | 11 | .214 | 12 | – | 16 | .429 |
† 1990 ACC tournament winner Rankings from AP Poll

The 1989–90 NC State Wolfpack men's basketball team represented North Carolina State University during the 1989–90 men's college basketball season. It was Jim Valvano's tenth and final season as head coach.

== Roster ==
1989–90 NC State Wolfpack men's basketball team
Players
Coaches

| Pos. | # | Name | Height | Weight | Year | Hometown |
|---|---|---|---|---|---|---|
| G | 13 | Chris Corchiani | 6 ft 1 in (1.85 m) | 185 lb (84 kg) | Jr | Coral Gables, Florida |
| G | 21 | Rodney Monroe | 6 ft 3 in (1.91 m) | 185 lb (84 kg) | Jr | Baltimore, Maryland |
| F | 22 | Brian Howard | 6 ft 6 in (1.98 m) | 205 lb (93 kg) | Sr | Winston-Salem, North Carolina |
| F | 24 | Tom Gugliotta | 6 ft 10 in (2.08 m) | 235 lb (107 kg) | So | Huntington Station, New York |
| G/F | 34 | Bryant Feggins | 6 ft 6 in (1.98 m) | 190 lb (86 kg) | Fr | Winston-Salem, North Carolina |
| C | 42 | Kevin Thompson | 6 ft 11 in (2.11 m) | 240 lb (109 kg) | Fr | Kernersville, North Carolina |

Head coach

- Jim Valvano (Rutgers)

Assistant coach(es)

Legend

- (C) Team captain
- (S) Suspended
- (I) Ineligible
- (W) Walk-on
- Injured
- Current redshirt

== Schedule ==
| Date time, TV | Rank^{#} | Opponent^{#} | Result | Record | Site city, state |
|---|---|---|---|---|---|
| November 15* | No. 19 | Richmond; Preseason NIT | W 57–48 | | Reynolds Coliseum; Raleigh, NC |
| November 17* | No. 19 | at DePaul; Preseason NIT | L 63–70 | | |
| November 27* | No. 25 | Appalachian State; Preseason NIT | W 97–67 | | Reynolds Coliseum; Raleigh, NC |
| December 1* | No. 25 | vs. Ohio State; Tournament of Champions | W 68–54 | | Charlotte, NC |
| December 2* | No. 25 | vs. No. 18 Pittsburgh; Tournament of Champions | W 100–87 | | Charlotte, NC |
| December 5* | No. 19 | vs. No. 15 St. John's; ACC–Big East Challenge | W 67–53 | | Greensboro, NC |
| December 7* | No. 19 | Duquesne | W 126–77 | | Reynolds Coliseum; Raleigh, NC |
| December 19* | No. 15 | East Tennessee State | L 82–92 | | Reynolds Coliseum; Raleigh, NC |
| December 21* | No. 15 | UNC-Asheville | W 110–70 | | Reynolds Coliseum; Raleigh, NC |
| December 27* | No. 19 | vs. Florida State; ECAC Holiday Festival | W 90–72 | | Madison Square Garden; New York, NY |
| December 29* | No. 19 | vs. Seton Hall; ECAC Holiday Festival | W 65–62 | | Madison Square Garden; New York, NY |
| January 3 | No. 18 | Clemson | W 79–77 | | Reynolds Coliseum; Raleigh, NC |
| January 6* | No. 18 | Temple | W 74–71 | | Atlantic City, NJ |
| January 10* | No. 17 | Boston University | W 95–70 | | Reynolds Coliseum; Raleigh, NC |
| January 13 | No. 17 | at No. 9 Georgia Tech | L 85–92 | | Alexander Memorial Coliseum; Atlanta, GA |
| January 18 | No. 19 | at Wake Forest | W 61–57 | | LJVM Coliseum; Winston-Salem, NC |
| January 20 | No. 19 | North Carolina | L 81–91 | | Reynolds Coliseum; Raleigh, NC |
| January 24 | | at No. 8 Duke | L 82–85 | | Cameron Indoor Stadium; Durham, NC |
| January 27 | | Maryland | W 81–61 | | Reynolds Coliseum; Raleigh, NC |
| January 31 | | Virginia | W 84–58 | | Reynolds Coliseum; Raleigh, NC |
| February 3* | | at No. 12 UNLV | L 82–88 | | Thomas & Mack Center; Las Vegas, NV |
| February 7 | | at North Carolina | W 88–77 | | Dean Smith Center; Chapel Hill, NC |
| February 10* | | DePaul | W 80–71 | | Reynolds Coliseum; Raleigh, NC |
| February 12 | | at Clemson | L 81–89 | | Littlejohn Coliseum; Clemson, SC |
| February 17 | | No. 13 Georgia Tech | L 92–95 ^{2OT} | | Reynolds Coliseum; Raleigh, NC |
| February 21 | | No. 3 Duke | W 76–71 | | Reynolds Coliseum; Raleigh, NC |
| February 25 | | at Virginia | L 71–77 | | University Hall; Charlottesville, VA |
| February 28 | | at Maryland | L 95–96 | | Cole Field House; College Park, MD |
| March 4 | | Wake Forest | L 91–93 | | Reynolds Coliseum; Raleigh, NC |
ACC Tournament
| March 9* | | vs. No. 14 Georgia Tech; ACC tournament | L 67–76 | | Charlotte Coliseum; Charlotte, NC |
*Non-conference game. ^{#}Rankings from AP Poll. (#) Tournament seedings in parentheses.

== Rankings ==
Ranking movements Legend: ██ Increase in ranking ██ Decrease in ranking — = Not ranked
| | Week | | | | | | | | | | | | | | | | | |
| Poll | Pre | 1 | 2 | 3 | 4 | 5 | 6 | 7 | 8 | 9 | 10 | 11 | 12 | 13 | 14 | 15 | 16 | Final |
|---|---|---|---|---|---|---|---|---|---|---|---|---|---|---|---|---|---|---|
| AP | 19 | 25 | 19 | 16 | 15 | 19 | 18 | 17 | 19 | — | — | — | — | — | — | — | — | — |
| Coaches | — | — | 18 | 15 | — | — | — | — | — | — | — | — | — | — | — | — | — | — |
