= Brian Oliver (basketball, born 1968) =

American-Italian basketball player (born 1968)

Personal information
- Born: June 1, 1968 (age 58) Chicago, Illinois, U.S.
- Listed height: 6 ft 4 in (1.93 m)
- Listed weight: 210 lb (95 kg)

Career information
- High school: Smyrna Campbell (Smyrna, Georgia)
- College: Georgia Tech (1986–1990)
- NBA draft: 1990: 2nd round, 32nd overall pick
- Drafted by: Philadelphia 76ers
- Playing career: 1990–2007
- Position: Shooting guard
- Number: 31, 2

Career history
- 1990–1992: Philadelphia 76ers
- 1992–1995: Rockford Lightning
- 1994: Washington Bullets
- 1995–1996: Maccabi Rishon LeZion
- 1996–1997: Viola Reggio Calabria
- 1997–1998: Polti Cantù
- 1998: Atlanta Hawks
- 1998–1999: Apollon Patras
- 1999–2000: Viola Reggio Calabria
- 2001–2003: Pallacanestro Messina
- 2003–2004: Coop Nordest Trieste
- 2004–2005: Upea Capo d'Orlando
- 2005–2006: Carifabriano
- 2007: Cimberio Novara

Career highlights
- All-CBA First Team (1994); All-CBA Second Team (1993); CBA All-Defensive Team (1995); CBA scoring champion (1994); 2× Second-team All-ACC (1989, 1990); ACC tournament MVP (1990); Third-team Parade All-American (1986); McDonald's All-American (1986)

Career NBA statistics
- Points: 389 (3.3 ppg)
- Rebounds: 123 (1.0 rpg)
- Assists: 114 (1.0 apg)
- Stats at NBA.com
- Stats at Basketball Reference

Brian Darnell Oliver (born June 1, 1968) is an American-Italian former professional basketball player. A 6-foot-4-inch (1.93 m), 210-pound (95 kg) shooting guard out of Georgia Tech, he was selected by the Philadelphia 76ers of the NBA in the second round (32nd pick overall) of the 1990 NBA draft. Oliver played four years in the league, mainly with the 76ers from 1990 to 1992 and two brief stints with the Washington Bullets (1994–95) and Atlanta Hawks (1997–98). His best year as a pro came during his rookie year with the Sixers, appearing in 73 games and averaging 3.8 ppg.

Brian Oliver, along with Dennis Scott and Kenny Anderson, formed the famed trio "Lethal Weapon 3" which led the GT basketball team to the final four in 1990. In 1999, he teamed with Manu Ginóbili, Brent Scott and Sydney Johnson to earn promotion for Viola Reggio Calabria from the Italian 2nd Division to the Italian First Division.

Oliver played for the Rockford Lightning of the Continental Basketball Association (CBA) from 1992 to 1995. He was selected to the All-CBA First Team in 1994, All-CBA Second Team in 1993 and All-Defensive Team in 1995.

Oliver's son, JP Tokoto, is a professional basketball player who was also drafted by the 76ers and has played internationally.

Oliver has been part of the Atlanta Hawks’ broadcasting team since the 2021-22 season.
