= 1989–90 Virginia Cavaliers men's basketball team =

American college basketball season

1989–90 Virginia Cavaliers men's basketball

NCAA tournament, Round of 32
- Conference: Atlantic Coast Conference
- Record: 20–12 (6–8 ACC)
- Head coach: Terry Holland (16th season)
- Assistant coaches: Jeff Jones (8th season); Craig Littlepage (2nd season)
- Home arena: University Hall

1989–90 ACC men's basketball standings
	Conf.				Overall
Team	W		L	PCT	W		L	PCT
No. 17 Clemson	10	–	4	.714	26	–	9	.743
No. 15 Duke	9	–	5	.643	29	–	9	.763
No. 9 Georgia Tech†	8	–	6	.571	28	–	7	.800
North Carolina	8	–	6	.571	21	–	13	.618
Virginia	6	–	8	.429	20	–	12	.625
NC State	6	–	8	.429	18	–	12	.600
Maryland	6	–	8	.429	19	–	14	.576
Wake Forest	3	–	11	.214	12	–	16	.429
† 1990 ACC tournament winner Rankings from AP Poll

The 1989–90 Virginia Cavaliers men's basketball team represented University of Virginia as a member of the Atlantic Coast Conference during the 1989–90 NCAA Division I men's basketball season. The team was led by 16th-year head coach Terry Holland, coaching in his final year at the school. The Cavaliers earned an at-large bid to the NCAA tournament as #7 seed in the Southeast region. They defeated Notre Dame in the opening round before falling to Syracuse in the second round. The Cavaliers finished with a record of 20–12 (6–8 ACC).

== Roster ==
1989–90 Virginia Cavaliers men's basketball team
Players
Coaches

Pos.	#	Name	Height	Weight	Year	Hometown
G	4	Terry Kirby	6 ft 3 in (1.91 m)	212 lb (96 kg)	Fr	Tabb, Virginia
G	5	Bernie Floriani	5 ft 10 in (1.78 m)	156 lb (71 kg)	Jr	Dover, Delaware
G	10	Anthony Oliver	6 ft 4 in (1.93 m)	185 lb (84 kg)	So	Faison, North Carolina
G	11	Doug Smith	6 ft 1 in (1.85 m)	170 lb (77 kg)	Fr	Fayetteville, Tennessee
G/F	13	Mark Cooke	6 ft 4 in (1.93 m)	212 lb (96 kg)	Sr	Martinsville, Virginia
G	15	Chris Havlicek	6 ft 5 in (1.96 m)	183 lb (83 kg)	Fr	Weston, Massachusetts
G/F	20	Bryant Stith	6 ft 5 in (1.96 m)	202 lb (92 kg)	So	Emporia, Virginia
F	21	Curtis Williams	6 ft 6 in (1.98 m)	233 lb (106 kg)	Sr	Easton, Massachusetts
G	22	John Crotty	6 ft 1 in (1.85 m)	179 lb (81 kg)	Jr	Orange, New Jersey
G	23	Blair Ford	6 ft 2 in (1.88 m)	170 lb (77 kg)	Fr	Atlanta, Georgia
G	24	Dirk Katstra	6 ft 6 in (1.98 m)	210 lb (95 kg)	Jr	Stilwell, Kansas
F	30	Matt Blundin	6 ft 7 in (2.01 m)	226 lb (103 kg)	Jr	Ridley Township, Pennsylvania
F	32	Jon Havey	6 ft 6 in (1.98 m)	220 lb (100 kg)	Fr	Chantilly, Virginia
F/C	42	Ted Jeffries	6 ft 9 in (2.06 m)	248 lb (112 kg)	Fr	Bowie, Maryland
F/C	44	Jeff Daniel	6 ft 9 in (2.06 m)	217 lb (98 kg)	Sr	Indianapolis, Indiana

Head coach

- Terry Holland (Davidson)

Assistant coach(es)

- Craig Littlepage (Penn)
- Jeff Jones (Virginia)

Legend

- (C) Team captain
- (S) Suspended
- (I) Ineligible
- (W) Walk-on
- Injured
- Current redshirt

== Schedule and results ==
Date time, TV	Rank^{#}	Opponent^{#}	Result	Record	Site (attendance) city, state
Regular season
Nov 24, 1989*		Northeastern	W 82–60	1–0	University Hall; Charlottesville, Virginia
Nov 25, 1989*		Marshall	W 83–63	2–0	University Hall; Charlottesville, Virginia
Nov 28, 1989*		Samford	W 87–61	3–0	University Hall; Charlottesville, Virginia
Mar 3, 1990		at Maryland	L 74–89	17–10 (6–8)	Cole Fieldhouse; College Park, Maryland
ACC Tournament
Mar 9, 1990*		vs. North Carolina; ACC Tournament Quarterfinal	W 92–85 ^{OT}	18–10	Bojangles Coliseum; Charlotte, North Carolina
Mar 10, 1990*		vs. No. 17 Clemson; ACC Tournament Semifinal	W 69–66	19–10	Bojangles Coliseum; Charlotte, North Carolina
Mar 11, 1990*		vs. No. 14 Georgia Tech; ACC Tournament Championship	L 61–70	19–11	Bojangles Coliseum; Charlotte, North Carolina
NCAA tournament
Mar 16, 1990*	(7 SE)	vs. (10 SE) Notre Dame; First Round	W 75–67	20–11	Richmond Coliseum; Richmond, Virginia
Mar 18, 1990*	(7 SE)	vs. (2 SE) No. 6 Syracuse; Second Round	L 61–63	20–12	Richmond Coliseum; Richmond, Virginia
*Non-conference game. ^{#}Rankings from AP poll. (#) Tournament seedings in parentheses. SE=Southeast. All times are in Eastern time.
