= Phil Henderson (basketball) =

American basketball player and coach (1968–2013)

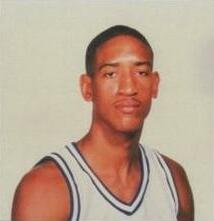
- Henderson with Duke, 1987–88

Personal information
- Born: April 17, 1968 Chicago, Illinois, U.S.
- Died: February 17, 2013 (aged 44) Philippines
- Listed height: 6 ft 4 in (1.93 m)
- Listed weight: 180 lb (82 kg)

Career information
- High school: Crete-Monee (Crete, Illinois)
- College: Duke (1986–1990)
- NBA draft: 1990: 2nd round, 49th overall pick
- Drafted by: Dallas Mavericks
- Playing career: 1990–1995
- Position: Shooting guard

Career history
- 1990–1991: Quad City Thunder
- 1991–1992: Sioux Falls Skyforce
- 1992–1993: Quad City Thunder
- 1993–1994: Fargo-Moorhead Fever
- 1994–1995: Tri-City Chinook

Career highlights
- Second-team All-ACC (1990); Fourth-team Parade All-American (1986); McDonald's All-American (1986)
- Stats at Basketball Reference

Phillip Terry Henderson (April 17, 1968 – February 17, 2013) was an American basketball player. He was best known for his collegiate career at Duke University, where he led the Blue Devils to three consecutive NCAA Final Four appearances. He was a second round pick of the Dallas Mavericks in the 1990 NBA draft, but never played in the NBA.

Henderson was a McDonald's All-American high school player at Crete-Monee High School in Crete, Illinois. He played for Hall of Fame coach Mike Krzyzewski at Duke, where he was a key player on three Final Four teams from 1988 to 1990. His most successful season was as a senior in 1989–90 as he averaged 18.5 points per game to lead the team and was named second team All-Atlantic Coast Conference and team MVP. He scored 1,397 points in his college career.

After college, Henderson was drafted in the second round of the 1990 NBA Draft by the Mavericks, but did not make the team. He played in Belgium and Mexico, as well as several years in the Continental Basketball Association (CBA). In parts of five seasons in the CBA, Henderson averaged 12.7 points and 2.5 rebounds per game.

Henderson retired from basketball in 1995 and moved to the Philippines to become a youth basketball coach. He died of a heart attack in his home there on February 17, 2013.
