= 1989–90 Duke Blue Devils men's basketball team =

American college basketball season

1989–90 Duke Blue Devils men's basketball

NCAA tournament, Runner-up

National Championship Game, L 73–103 vs. UNLV
- Conference: Atlantic Coast Conference

Ranking
- Coaches: No. 14
- AP: No. 15
- Record: 29–9 (9–5 ACC)
- Head coach: Mike Krzyzewski (10th season)
- Assistant coaches: Pete Gaudet; Mike Brey; Tommy Amaker; Jay Bilas (1st season)
- Home arena: Cameron Indoor Stadium

1989–90 ACC men's basketball standings
| | Conf. | | | | Overall |
| Team | W | | L | PCT | W | | L | PCT |
|---|---|---|---|---|---|---|---|---|
| No. 17 Clemson | 10 | – | 4 | .714 | 26 | – | 9 | .743 |
| No. 15 Duke | 9 | – | 5 | .643 | 29 | – | 9 | .763 |
| No. 9 Georgia Tech† | 8 | – | 6 | .571 | 28 | – | 7 | .800 |
| North Carolina | 8 | – | 6 | .571 | 21 | – | 13 | .618 |
| Virginia | 6 | – | 8 | .429 | 20 | – | 12 | .625 |
| NC State | 6 | – | 8 | .429 | 18 | – | 12 | .600 |
| Maryland | 6 | – | 8 | .429 | 19 | – | 14 | .576 |
| Wake Forest | 3 | – | 11 | .214 | 12 | – | 16 | .429 |
† 1990 ACC tournament winner Rankings from AP Poll

The 1989–90 Duke Blue Devils men's basketball team represented Duke University. The head coach was Mike Krzyzewski. The team played its home games in the Cameron Indoor Stadium in Durham, North Carolina, and was a member of the Atlantic Coast Conference. The team finished with an overall record of 29–9 (9–5 ACC) Duke was invited to the 1990 NCAA Tournament as a #3 seed. The Blue Devils reached their third straight Final Four with a thrilling overtime victory over Connecticut 79–78. Duke came up short once again in the National Championship game, as they were soundly beaten by UNLV 103–73.

== Roster ==
1989–90 Duke Blue Devils men's basketball team
Players
Coaches

| Pos. | # | Name | Height | Weight | Year | Hometown |
|---|---|---|---|---|---|---|
| C | 30 | Alaa Abdelnaby | 6 ft 10 in (2.08 m) | 240 lb (109 kg) | Sr | Bloomfield, New Jersey |
| F | 21 | Robert Brickey | 6 ft 5 in (1.96 m) | 205 lb (93 kg) | Sr | Fayetteville, North Carolina |
| F/C | 45 | Clay Buckley | 6 ft 10 in (2.08 m) | 225 lb (102 kg) | Jr | Wayne, Pennsylvania |
| G | 13 | Joe Cook | 6 ft 2 in (1.88 m) | 195 lb (88 kg) | Jr | Lincoln, Illinois |
| G/F | 23 | Brian Davis | 6 ft 6 in (1.98 m) | 195 lb (88 kg) | So | Capitol Heights, Maryland |
| G | 3 | Phil Henderson | 6 ft 4 in (1.93 m) | 170 lb (77 kg) | Sr | University Park, Illinois |
| G/F | 25 | Thomas Hill | 6 ft 4 in (1.93 m) | 190 lb (86 kg) | Fr | Lancaster, Texas |
| G | 11 | Bobby Hurley | 6 ft 0 in (1.83 m) | 150 lb (68 kg) | Fr | Jersey City, New Jersey |
| F | 22 | Greg Koubek | 6 ft 6 in (1.98 m) | 205 lb (93 kg) | Jr | Clifton Park, New York |
| F | 32 | Christian Laettner | 6 ft 11 in (2.11 m) | 225 lb (102 kg) | So | Angola, New York |
| G | 5 | Billy McCaffrey | 6 ft 3 in (1.91 m) | 175 lb (79 kg) | Fr | Allentown, Pennsylvania |
| C | 34 | Crawford Palmer | 6 ft 9 in (2.06 m) | 225 lb (102 kg) | So | Arlington, Virginia |

Head coach

- Mike Krzyzewski (Army)

Assistant coach(es)

- Pete Gaudet (Boston University)
- Mike Brey (George Washington)
- Tommy Amaker (Duke)
- Jay Bilas (Duke)

Legend

- (C) Team captain
- (S) Suspended
- (I) Ineligible
- (W) Walk-on
- Injured
- Current redshirt

== Schedule ==
| Date time, TV | Rank^{#} | Opponent^{#} | Result | Record | High points | High rebounds | High assists | Site city, state |
Regular season
| November 25, 1989* | No. 10 | Harvard | W 130–54 | 1–0 | 22 – Tied | 9 – Laettner | 12 – Henderson | Cameron Indoor Stadium; Durham, NC |
| November 29, 1989* | No. 7 | Canisius | W 102–66 | 2–0 | 18 – Tied | 7 – Laettner | 9 – Hurley | Cameron Indoor Stadium; Durham, NC |
| December 2, 1989* | No. 7 | at Northwestern | W 103–77 | 3–0 | 23 – Laettner | 18 – Laettner | 6 – Hurley | Welsh–Ryan Arena; Evanston, IL |
| December 6, 1989* | No. 6 | vs. No. 1 Syracuse; ACC/Big East Challenge | L 76–78 | 3–1 | 21 – Brickey | 9 – Abdelnaby | 10 – Hurley | Greensboro Coliseum; Greensboro, NC |
| December 9, 1989* | No. 6 | at No. 8 Michigan | L 108–113 ^{OT} | 3–2 | 26 – Laettner | 8 – Laettner | 6 – Hurley | Crisler Arena; Ann Arbor, MI |
| December 21, 1989* | No. 12 | at Davidson | W 89–44 | 4–2 | 14 – Henderson | 8 – Brickey | 4 – Hurley | Belk Arena; Davidson, NC |
| December 23, 1989* | No. 12 | Washington | W 74–64 | 5–2 | 19 – Laettner | 5 – Tied | 6 – Hurley | Cameron Indoor Stadium; Durham, NC |
| December 28, 1989* | No. 13 | vs. Drake; Rainbow Classic | W 101–77 | 6–2 | 20 – Laettner | 6 – Laettner | 9 – Hurley | Neal S. Blaisdell Center; Honolulu, HI |
| December 29, 1989* | No. 13 | vs. Cincinnati; Rainbow Classic | W 95–83 | 7–2 | 18 – Laettner | 11 – Laettner | 8 – Hurley | Neal S. Blaisdell Center; Honolulu, HI |
| December 30, 1989* | No. 13 | at Hawaii; Rainbow Classic | W 87–75 | 8–2 | 19 – Tied | 10 – Abdelnaby | 4 – Hurley | Neal S. Blaisdell Center; Honolulu, HI |
| January 3, 1990* | No. 13 | The Citadel | W 108–69 | 9–2 | 29 – Henderson | 12 – Abdelnaby | 8 – Hurley | Cameron Indoor Stadium; Durham, NC |
| January 6, 1990 | No. 13 | Virginia | W 76–68 | 10–2 | 16 – Abdelnaby | 8 – Laettner | 9 – Hurley | Cameron Indoor Stadium; Durham, NC |
| January 11, 1990 | No. 10 | at No. 9 Georgia Tech | W 96–91 | 11–2 | 26 – Henderson | 10 – Laettner | 11 – Hurley | Alexander Memorial Coliseum; Atlanta, GA |
| January 13, 1990 | No. 10 | Maryland; Rivalry | W 91–80 | 12–2 | 27 – Laettner | 8 – Henderson | 9 – Hurley | Cameron Indoor Stadium; Durham, N.C. |
| January 17, 1990 | No. 8 | at North Carolina; Rivalry | L 60–79 | 12–3 | 18 – Laettner | 13 – Laettner | 1 – Tied | Dean Smith Center; Chapel Hill, NC |
| January 20, 1990 | No. 8 | at Wake Forest | W 97–69 | 13–3 | 18 – Tied | 11 – Tied | 7 – Hurley | LJVM Coliseum; Winston-Salem, NC |
| January 22, 1990 | No. 8 | at William & Mary | W 109–76 | 14–3 | 25 – Henderson | 9 – Laettner | 6 – Hurley | Kaplan Arena; Williamsburg, VA |
| January 24, 1990 | No. 8 | NC State | W 85–82 ^{OT} | 15–3 | 25 – Henderson | 16 – Laettner | 12 – Hurley | Cameron Indoor Stadium; Durham, NC |
| January 28, 1990 | No. 8 | No. 13 Georgia Tech | W 88–86 | 16–3 | 19 – Laettner | 11 – Laettner | 13 – Hurley | Cameron Indoor Stadium; Durham, NC |
| January 31, 1990 | No. 5 | Clemson | W 94–80 | 17–3 | 20 – Henderson | 7 – Tied | 11 – Hurley | Cameron Indoor Stadium; Durham, NC |
| February 4, 1990* | No. 5 | Notre Dame | W 88–76 | 18–3 | 22 – Abdelnaby | 10 – Laettner | 10 – Hurley | Cameron Indoor Stadium; Durham, NC |
| February 8, 1990 | No. 4 | at Virginia | L 69–72 | 18–4 | 16 – Abdelnaby | 19 – Laettner | 5 – Hurley | University Hall; Charlottesville, VA |
| February 10, 1990 | No. 4 | at Maryland; Rivalry | W 114–111 ^{OT} | 19–4 | 26 – Tied | 8 – Abdelnaby | 8 – Hurley | Cole Field House; College Park, MD |
| February 12, 1990* | No. 4 | vs. Stetson | W 102–67 | 20–4 | 18 – Abdelnaby | 12 – Laettner | 10 – Hurley | Amway Arena; Orlando, FL |
| February 14, 1990* | No. 6 | East Carolina | W 84–51 | 21–4 | 21 – McCaffrey | 6 – Laettner | 9 – Hurley | Cameron Indoor Stadium; Durham, NC |
| February 18, 1990 | No. 6 | Wake Forest | W 71–56 | 22–4 | 15 – Tied | 9 – Laettner | 3 – Tied | Cameron Indoor Stadium; Durham, NC |
| February 21, 1990 | No. 3 | at NC State | L 71–76 | 22–5 | 32 – Abdelnaby | 12 – Laettner | 13 – Hurley | Reynolds Coliseum; Raleigh, NC |
| February 25, 1990* | No. 3 | No. 21 Arizona | W 78–76 | 23–5 | 28 – Henderson | 7 – Laettner | 6 – Hurley | Cameron Indoor Stadium; Durham, NC |
| February 28, 1990 | No. 5 | at No. 20 Clemson | L 93–97 | 23–6 | 25 – Laettner | 12 – Laettner | 10 – Hurley | Littlejohn Coliseum; Clemson, SC |
| March 4, 1990 | No. 5 | North Carolina | L 75–87 | 23–7 | 16 – Tied | 11 – Laettner | 6 – Hurley | Cameron Indoor Stadium; Durham, NC |
ACC Tournament
| March 9, 1990 | No. 12 | vs. Maryland; Quarterfinals | W 104–84 | 24–7 | 24 – Henderson | 13 – Laettner | 7 – Hurley | Charlotte Coliseum; Charlotte, NC |
| March 10, 1990 | No. 12 | vs. No. 14 Georgia Tech; Semifinals | L 72–83 | 24–8 | 29 – Laettner | 9 – Laettner | 8 – Hurley | Charlotte Coliseum; Charlotte, NC |
NCAA tournament
| March 16, 1990* | No. 15 | vs. Richmond; First Round | W 81–46 | 25–8 | 22 – Abdelnaby | 12 – Abdelnaby | 6 – Hurley | Omni Coliseum; Atlanta, GA |
| March 18, 1990* | No. 15 | vs. St. John's; Second Round | W 76–72 | 26–8 | 22 – Brickey | 9 – Brickey | 7 – Hurley | Omni Coliseum; Atlanta, GA |
| March 22, 1990* | No. 15 | vs. UCLA; Sweet Sixteen | W 90–81 | 27–8 | 28 – Henderson | 14 – Laettner | 9 – Hurley | Brendan Byrne Arena; East Rutherford, NJ |
| March 24, 1990* | No. 15 | vs. No. 3 Connecticut; Elite Eight | W 79–78 ^{OT} | 28–8 | 27 – Abdelnaby | 14 – Abdelnaby | 8 – Hurley | Brendan Byrne Arena; East Rutherford, NJ |
| March 31, 1990* | No. 15 | vs. No. 7 Arkansas; Final Four | W 97–83 | 29–8 | 28 – Henderson | 14 – Laettner | 6 – Hurley | McNichols Sports Arena; Denver, CO |
| April 2, 1990* | No. 15 | vs. No. 2 UNLV; National Championship | L 73–103 | 29–9 | 21 – Henderson | 9 – Laettner | 5 – Laettner | McNichols Sports Arena; Denver, CO |
*Non-conference game. ^{#}Rankings from AP Poll. (#) Tournament seedings in parentheses. Source: Duke media guide

== Team players drafted into the NBA ==
| Year | Round | Pick | Player | NBA club |
| 1990 | 1 | 25 | Alaa Abdelnaby | Portland Trail Blazers |
| 1990 | 2 | 49 | Phil Henderson | Dallas Mavericks |
