= Harold Merritt =

American basketball coach

Biographical details
- Born: July 28, 1951 (age 75); Manhattan, New York, U.S.

Coaching career (HC unless noted)
- 1990–1994: Northern Arizona

Head coaching record
- Overall: 34–72

Harold Merritt (born July 28, 1951) is an American college basketball coach. He was the head coach at Northern Arizona University from 1990 to 1994.
