= 1989–90 North Carolina Tar Heels men's basketball team =

American college basketball season

1989–90 North Carolina Tar Heels men's basketball

NCAA tournament, Sweet 16
- Conference: Atlantic Coast Conference
- Record: 21–13 (8–6 ACC)
- Head coach: Dean Smith (28th season)
- Assistant coach: Bill Guthridge (22nd season)
- Home arena: Dean Smith Center

1989–90 ACC men's basketball standings
	Conf.				Overall
Team	W		L	PCT	W		L	PCT
No. 17 Clemson	10	–	4	.714	26	–	9	.743
No. 15 Duke	9	–	5	.643	29	–	9	.763
No. 9 Georgia Tech†	8	–	6	.571	28	–	7	.800
North Carolina	8	–	6	.571	21	–	13	.618
Virginia	6	–	8	.429	20	–	12	.625
NC State	6	–	8	.429	18	–	12	.600
Maryland	6	–	8	.429	19	–	14	.576
Wake Forest	3	–	11	.214	12	–	16	.429
† 1990 ACC tournament winner Rankings from AP Poll

The 1989–90 North Carolina Tar Heels men's basketball team represented the University of North Carolina at Chapel Hill.

Led by head coach Dean Smith, the Tar Heels reached the Sweet 16 in the NCAA tournament.

== Roster ==
1988–89 North Carolina Tar Heels men's basketball team
Players
Coaches

Pos.	#	Name	Height	Weight	Year	Hometown
G	3	Jeff Denny	6 ft 4 in (1.93 m)	—	Sr	Rural Hall, North Carolina
G	4	Kenny Harris	6 ft 1 in (1.85 m)	—	Fr	Petersburg, Virginia
G/F	5	Henrik Rödl	6 ft 7 in (2.01 m)	—	Fr	Heusenstamm, West Germany
G	11	Scott Cherry	6 ft 4 in (1.93 m)	—	Fr	Ballston Spa, New York
G	21	King Rice	6 ft 0 in (1.83 m)	—	Jr	Binghamton, New York
G/F	22	Kevin Madden	6 ft 6 in (1.98 m)	—	Sr	Staunton, Virginia
F	32	Pete Chilcutt	6 ft 9 in (2.06 m)	230 lb (104 kg)	Jr	Eutaw, Alabama
F	34	George Lynch	6 ft 7 in (2.01 m)	218 lb (99 kg)	Fr	Roanoke, Virginia
G	40	Hubert Davis	6 ft 5 in (1.96 m)	180 lb (82 kg)	So	Burke, Virginia
C	42	Scott Williams	6 ft 11 in (2.11 m)	230 lb (104 kg)	Sr	Hacienda Heights, California
F	44	Rick Fox	6 ft 7 in (2.01 m)	225 lb (102 kg)	Jr	Nassau, Bahamas
F/C	45	Marty Hensley	6 ft 11 in (2.11 m)	—	Sr	Marion, North Carolina
C	54	John Greene	6 ft 10 in (2.08 m)	—	Sr	Raleigh, North Carolina
C	55	Matt Wenstrom	7 ft 1 in (2.16 m)	250 lb (113 kg)	Fr	Katy, Texas

Head coach

- Dean Smith (Kansas)

Assistant coach(es)

- Bill Guthridge (Kansas State)

Legend

- (C) Team captain
- (S) Suspended
- (I) Ineligible
- (W) Walk-on
- Injured
- Current redshirt

== Schedule and results ==
Date time, TV	Rank^{#}	Opponent^{#}	Result	Record	Site city, state
Nov 24, 1989*	No. 7	vs. James Madison; Maui Invitational	W 80–79	1–0	Lahaina Civic Center; Lahaina, HI
Nov 25, 1989*	No. 7	vs. Villanova; Maui Invitational	W 78–68	2–0	Lahaina Civic Center; Lahaina, HI
Nov 26, 1989*	No. 7	vs. No. 11 Missouri; Maui Invitational	L 73–80	2–1	Lahaina Civic Center; Lahaina, HI
Nov 30, 1989*	No. 12	at Alabama	L 93–101	2–2	Coleman Coliseum; Tuscaloosa, AL
Dec 2, 1989*	No. 12	UCF	W 92–42	3–2	Dean Smith Center; Chapel Hill, NC
Dec 3, 1989*	No. 12	Towson State	W 87–70	4–2	Dean Smith Center; Chapel Hill, NC
Dec 7, 1989*	No. 17	vs. No. 3 Georgetown; ACC-Big East Challenge	L 81–93	4–3	Brendan Byrne Arena; East Rutherford, NJ
Dec 9, 1989*	No. 17	at Iowa	L 74–87	4–4	Carver-Hawkeye Arena; Iowa City, IA
Dec 16, 1989*		DePaul	W 70–51	5–4	Dean Smith Center; Chapel Hill, NC
Dec 23, 1989*		vs. Kansas State	W 79–63	6–4	Charlotte Coliseum; Charlotte, NC
Dec 27, 1989*	No. 24	vs. Kentucky	W 121–110	7–4	Freedom Hall; Louisville, KY
Feb 28, 1990*		No. 11 Georgia Tech	W 81–79	18–11 (7–6)	Dean Smith Center; Chapel Hill, NC
Mar 4, 1990*		at No. 5 Duke	W 87–75	19–11 (8–6)	Cameron Indoor Stadium; Durham, NC
ACC Tournament
Mar 9, 1990*	(4)	vs. (5) Virginia; ACC Tournament Quarterfinal	L 85–92 ^{OT}	19–12	Charlotte Coliseum; Charlotte, NC
NCAA Tournament
Mar 15, 1990*	(8 MW)	vs. (9 MW) SW Missouri State	W 83–70	20–12	Frank Erwin Center; Austin, TX
Mar 17, 1990*	(8 MW)	vs. (1 MW) No. 1 Oklahoma; Second round	W 79–77	21–12	Frank Erwin Center; Austin, TX
Mar 22, 1990*	(8 MW)	vs. (4 MW) No. 7 Arkansas; Midwest Regional semifinal	L 73–96	21–13	Reunion Arena; Dallas, TX
*Non-conference game. ^{#}Rankings from AP. (#) Tournament seedings in parentheses. MW=Midwest. All times are in EST.
