= 2003–04 Dayton Flyers men's basketball team =

American college basketball season

2003–04 Dayton Flyers men's basketball
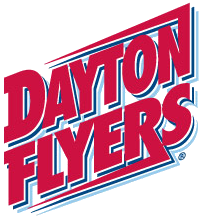

2003 Maui Invitational Champions Atlantic 10 West Division Champions

NCAA tournament, first round
- Conference: Atlantic 10 Conference
- Record: 24–9 (12–4 A-10)
- Head coach: Brian Gregory (1st season)
- Assistant coaches: Billy Schmidt; Mo Cassara; Mike Jackson
- Home arena: University of Dayton Arena

2003–04 Atlantic 10 men's basketball standings
	Conf.				Overall
Team	W		L	PCT	W		L	PCT
East
No. 5 Saint Joseph's	16	–	0	1.000	30	–	2	.938
Temple	9	–	7	.563	15	–	14	.517
Rhode Island	7	–	9	.438	20	–	14	.588
UMass	4	–	12	.250	10	–	19	.345
St. Bonaventure	3	–	13	.188	7	–	21	.250
Fordham	3	–	13	.188	6	–	22	.214
West
Dayton	12	–	4	.750	24	–	9	.727
George Washington	11	–	5	.688	18	–	12	.600
Xavier †	10	–	6	.625	26	–	11	.703
Richmond	10	–	6	.625	20	–	13	.606
Duquesne	6	–	10	.375	12	–	17	.414
La Salle	5	–	11	.313	10	–	20	.333
† 2004 Atlantic 10 Tournament winner Rankings from AP Poll

The 2003–04 Dayton Flyers men's basketball team represented the University of Dayton during the 2003–04 NCAA Division I men's basketball season. The Flyers, led by first year head coach Brian Gregory, played their home games at the University of Dayton Arena and were members of the Atlantic 10 Conference. They finished the season 24–9, 12–4 in A-10 play, finishing first in the A-10's West division. Dayton opened the season winning the Maui Invitational. The Flyers advanced to the finals of the Atlantic 10 tournament where they were defeated by rival Xavier. Dayton received an at-large bid to the NCAA tournament, the program's first consecutive NCAA appearances since the 1960s. The Flyers lost to DePaul in the first round.

== Previous season ==
The 2002-03 Dayton Flyers finished the season with an overall record of 24–6, with a record of 14–2 in the Atlantic 10 regular season. The Flyers defeated Temple to win the Atlantic 10 tournament title. They received a bid to play in the NCAA tournament where they fell to Tulsa in the first round.

== Offseason ==
=== Departures ===
Name	Number	Pos.	Height	Weight	Year	Hometown	Notes
D.J. Stelly	2	G	6'4"	193	Senior	Aurora, CO	Graduated
Nate Green	5	F	6'6"	245	Senior	Laurel, MD	Graduated
Brooks Hall	33	G/F	6'6"	205	Senior	Troy, OH	Graduated

== Incoming recruits ==
College recruiting information
Name	Hometown	School	Height	Weight	Commit date
Jon Kingston; F	Columbus, OH	Grandview Heights	6 ft 9 in (2.06 m)	238 lb (108 kg)	Aug 18, 2003
Jon Kingston; F	Recruit ratings: Scout: Rivals: (N/A)				
Chris Spears; G	Centerville, OH	Centerville High School	6 ft 2 in (1.88 m)	170 lb (77 kg)	Jul 8, 2003
Chris Spears; G	Recruit ratings: Scout: Rivals: (N/A)				
Nick Stafford; F	Worcester, MA	Worcester Academy	6 ft 8 in (2.03 m)	190 lb (86 kg)	Dec 1, 2003
Nick Stafford; F	Recruit ratings: Scout: Rivals: (N/A)				
Overall recruit ranking:
Note: In many cases, Scout, Rivals, 247Sports, On3, and ESPN may conflict in their listings of height and weight.; In these cases, the average was taken. ESPN grades are on a 100-point scale.; Sources: "2003 Team Ranking". Rivals.

== Roster ==
2003–04 Dayton Flyers men's basketball team
Players
Coaches

Pos.	#	Name	Height	Weight	Year	Previous school	Hometown
F	1	Monty Scott	6 ft 6 in (1.98 m)	226 lb (103 kg)	RS Fr	Reynoldsburg	Reynoldsburg, OH
G	2	Chris Spears	6 ft 2 in (1.88 m)	180 lb (82 kg)	Fr	Centerville	Centerville, OH
G	3	Ramod Marshall	6 ft 2 in (1.88 m)	180 lb (82 kg)	Sr	Garinger	Charlotte, NC
G	11	Warren Williams	6 ft 0 in (1.83 m)	190 lb (86 kg)	So	DeMatha	Gaithersburg, MD
G	13	Greg Kohls (W)	6 ft 2 in (1.88 m)	170 lb (77 kg)	Sr	Centerville	Centerville, OH
G	14	Mark Jones	6 ft 1 in (1.85 m)	180 lb (82 kg)	Jr	Norwich	Taftville, CT
G	15	Logan White	6 ft 5 in (1.96 m)	172 lb (78 kg)	So	University	Cleveland, OH
G	22	Marques Bennett	6 ft 5 in (1.96 m)	190 lb (86 kg)	Fr	Brebeuf Jesuit	Indianapolis, IN
F	42	Frank Iguodala	6 ft 5 in (1.96 m)	210 lb (95 kg)	Sr	Lanphier/Lake Land College	Springfield, IL
C	44	James Cripe	6 ft 10 in (2.08 m)	244 lb (111 kg)	RS Fr	Loveland	Loveland, OH
F	45	Keith Waleskowski	6 ft 8 in (2.03 m)	231 lb (105 kg)	Sr	Alter	Dayton, OH
F	53	Nick Stafford (redshirt)	6 ft 9 in (2.06 m)	215 lb (98 kg)	Fr	Worcester	Springfield, MA
C	54	Sean Finn	7 ft 0 in (2.13 m)	240 lb (109 kg)	Sr	Hays	Hays, KS
C	55	Jon Kingston	6 ft 8 in (2.03 m)	238 lb (108 kg)	Fr	Grandview Heights	Columbus, OH

Head coach

- Brian Gregory (Oakland)

Assistant coach(es)

- Billy Schmidt (Wake Forest)
- Mo Cassara (St. Lawrence)
- Mike Jackson (Detroit Mercy)

Legend

- (C) Team captain
- (S) Suspended
- (I) Ineligible
- (W) Walk-on
- Injured
- Current redshirt

Roster

== Schedule ==
Date time, TV	Rank^{#}	Opponent^{#}	Result	Record	Site (attendance) city, state
Non-conference regular season
11/21/2003*		at Pepperdine	W 90–77	1–0	Firestone Fieldhouse (1,899); Malibu, CA
11/24/2003*		vs. Central Michigan; Maui Invitational First Round	W 82–63	2–0	Lahaina Civic Center (2,500); Lahaina, HI
11/25/2003*		vs. San Diego State; Maui Invitational Semifinals	W 76–71	3–0	Lahaina Civic Center (2,500); Lahaina, HI
11/26/2003*		vs. Hawaii; Maui Invitational Championship Game	W 82–72	4–0	Lahaina Civic Center (2,500); Lahaina, HI
12/3/2003*		Miami	W 67-61	5–0	UD Arena (12,798); Dayton, OH
12/6/2003*		Wagner	W 67-65	6–0	UD Arena (12,682); Dayton, OH
12/9/2003*	No. 25	Louisiana-Lafayette	W 66–59	7–0	UD Arena (12,055); Dayton, OH
12/13/2003*	No. 25	IUPUI	W 61–59	8–0	UD Arena (12,277); Dayton, OH
12/20/2003*	No. 24	Prairie View A&M	W 78–65	9–0	UD Arena (12,136); Dayton, OH
12/23/2003*	No. 23	at No. 14 Cincinnati	L 53-82	9–1	Myrl H. Shoemaker Center (13,176); Cincinnati, OH
12/29/2003*		Wofford	W 81–64	10-1	UD Arena (13,177); Dayton, OH
12/31/2003*		Saint Louis	L 49–60	10-2	UD Arena (12,353); Dayton, OH
1/03/2004*		at Wyoming	L 59-61	10-3	Arena-Auditorium (7,544); Laramie, WY
Atlantic 10 regular season
01/07/2004		St. Bonaventure	W 76–72	11–3 (1–0)	UD Arena (12,899); Dayton, OH
01/10/2004		Temple	W 60–56	12–3 (2–0)	UD Arena (13,409); Dayton, OH
01/14/2004		at Richmond	W 55-50	13–3 (3–0)	Robins Center (5,282); Richmond, VA
01/17/2004		at Fordham	W 75–56	14–3 (4–0)	Rose Hill Gym (2,251); Bronx, New York
01/21/2004		at George Washington	W 74-66	15–3 (5–0)	UD Arena (12,558); Dayton, OH
01/24/2004		at La Salle	W 77–75	16–3 (6–0)	Tom Gola Arena (3,715); Philadelphia, PA
01/31/2004		Xavier; Blackburn/McCafferty Trophy	W 74-67	17–3 (7–0)	UD Arena (13,409); Dayton, OH
02/04/2004		at Richmond	W 62-57	18–3 (8–0)	UD Arena (12,794); Dayton, OH
02/08/2004		at Massachusetts	W 66-59	19–3 (9–0)	Mullins Center (4,076); Amherst, MA
02/11/2004		at No. 3 Saint Joseph's	L 67–81	19–4 (9–1)	Alumni Memorial Fieldhouse (3,200); Philadelphia, PA
02/15/2004		Duquesne	W 70–58	20–4 (10–1)	UD Arena (13,260); Dayton, OH
02/18/2004		at George Washington	L 64-66	20–5 (10–2)	Charles E. Smith Athletic Center (5,033); Washington, D.C.
02/21/2004		at Xavier; Blackburn/McCafferty Trophy	L 60-67	20–6 (10–3)	Cintas Center (10,250); Cincinnati, OH
02/28/2004		La Salle	W 72-58	21–6 (11–3)	UD Arena (13,409); Dayton, OH
03/03/2004		Rhode Island	L 63-65	21–7 (11–4)	UD Arena (12,665); Dayton, OH
03/06/2004		Duquesne	W 73-69	22-7 (12-4)	UD Arena (5,406); Dayton, OH
Atlantic 10 tournament
03/11/2004		Duquesne; Quarterfinals	W 69-56	23–7	UD Arena (N/A); Dayton, OH
03/12/2004		Richmond; Semifinals	W 58-56	24-7	UD Arena (11,566); Dayton, OH
03/13/2004		Xavier; Championship Game	L 49-58	24-8	UD Arena (13,133); Dayton, OH
NCAA tournament
03/18/2004*	(10)	vs. (7) DePaul; First Round	L 69-76 ^{2OT}	24-9	HSBC Arena (18,698); Buffalo, NY
*Non-conference game. ^{#}Rankings from AP Poll. (#) Tournament seedings in parentheses. All times are in Eastern Time.
