= Blackburn/McCafferty Trophy =

American college basketball rivalry

- Dayton Flyers Xavier Musketeers
- Sport: Men's basketball
- First meeting: February 20, 1920; Dayton 24, Xavier 18
- Latest meeting: November 29, 2015; Dayton 61, Xavier 90

Statistics
- All-time series: Dayton leads 84–74

Locations of Dayton and Xavier

The Blackburn/McCafferty Trophy is the award given to the winner of regular season basketball games between the University of Dayton and Xavier University.

== Origin of competition ==
The first meeting between the two Catholic universities was a 24-18 victory by Dayton on February 20, 1920. The two schools have maintained an annual meeting since then, frequently meeting twice in one season. The series has been interrupted four times, most recently from 1943-45 due to World War II. Xavier held a commanding early lead in the series until Dayton won 61 of the next 74 games beginning in 1950. The rivalry between the two schools took on added significance beginning in the 1988-89 season when Dayton joined Xavier in the Midwestern Collegiate Conference (now the Horizon League) and again in the 1995-96 season when Dayton and Xavier joined the Atlantic 10 Conference. Dayton has not won against Xavier in Cincinnati since January 10, 1981, a streak that extends to 26 games. Through the 2014-15 season, Dayton leads the all-time series 84–74. Dayton holds the longest winning streak in the series, with 10 consecutive wins between 1972 and 1977. The longest streak in the Atlantic 10 belongs to both Xavier and Dayton for 150 meetings between the two. Starting in the 2013–14 season, the matchup is once again a non-conference rivalry, after Xavier left the A10 to become a member of the Big East Conference. After a 9 year hiatus, the teams will meet in a Mental Health Awareness Charity Game at University of Dayton Arena on October 20th, 2024.

== The Blackburn/McCafferty Trophy ==
In the 1980-81 season, the two schools began playing for the Blackburn/McCafferty Trophy during regular season meetings. Named for former Dayton coach Tom Blackburn and former Xavier coach Jim McCafferty, the award commemorates the two men responsible for raising the national profile of their respective basketball programs. The winner retains possession of the trophy until the next meeting. Since the inception of the Blackburn/McCafferty Trophy, Xavier leads 37-20 in the regular season meetings. Along with the trophy, an MVP is named for the game and scholarship money is raised for each university .

== Results ==
Rankings are from the AP Poll (1936–present)

Dayton victories	Xavier victories	Tie games

No.	Date	Location	Winner	Score
1	February 20, 1920	Dayton, OH	Dayton	24–18
2	1920-21	Cincinnati, OH	Xavier	21–18
3	1921-22	Cincinnati, OH	Xavier	27–13
4	1921-22	Dayton, OH	Dayton	14–10
5	1928-29	Cincinnati, OH	Xavier	18–12
6	February 23, 1929	Dayton, OH	Xavier	26–25
7	1929-30	Cincinnati, OH	Dayton	20–19
8	1929-30	Dayton, OH	Xavier	29–18
9	1930-31	Dayton, OH	Xavier	33–10
10	1930-31	Cincinnati, OH	Xavier	40–19
11	1931-32	Dayton, OH	Xavier	20–10
12	1931-32	Cincinnati, OH	Xavier	46–12
13	January 16, 1940	Dayton, OH	Dayton	44–29
14	February 14, 1940	Cincinnati, OH	Xavier	34–27
15	1940-41	Cincinnati, OH	Xavier	54–30
16	1940-41	Cincinnati, OH	Xavier	37–35
17	1941-42	Cincinnati, OH	Xavier	58–42
18	1941-42	Dayton, OH	Dayton	46–32
19	1942-43	Cincinnati, OH	Xavier	61–39
20	1942-43	Dayton, OH	Dayton	51–28
21	1945-46	Cincinnati, OH	Xavier	48–41
22	1945-46	Dayton, OH	Dayton	47–33
23	January 4, 1947	Dayton, OH	Dayton	35–34
24	February 13, 1947	Cincinnati, OH	Xavier	75–55
25	February 10, 1948	Dayton, OH	Xavier	72–52
26	February 24, 1948	Cincinnati, OH	Xavier	57–32
27	February 15, 1949	Dayton, OH	Xavier	66–48
28	February 27, 1949	Cincinnati, OH	Xavier	49–44
29	January 22, 1950	Cincinnati, OH	Dayton	65–55
30	February 13, 1950	Dayton, OH	Dayton	59–42
31	March 2, 1950	Cleveland, OH	Dayton	59–51
32	February 11, 1951	Cincinnati, OH	No. 18 Dayton	63–57
33	March 3, 1951	Dayton, OH	No. 14 Dayton	77–53
34	January 27, 1952	Dayton, OH	No. 16 Dayton	67–60
35	February 24, 1952	Cincinnati, OH	No. 11 Dayton	82–80
36	January 18, 1953	Cincinnati, OH	Xavier	70–68
37	February 22, 1953	Dayton, OH	Dayton	81–63
38	January 24, 1954	Dayton, OH	Dayton	66–58
39	February 21, 1954	Cincinnati, OH	No. 17 Dayton	81–63
40	January 30, 1955	Cincinnati, OH	No. 15 Dayton	91–80
41	February 20, 1955	Dayton, OH	No. 13 Dayton	71–60
42	January 21, 1956	Dayton, OH	No. 2 Dayton	81–73
43	February 19, 1956	Cincinnati, OH	No. 2 Dayton	85–75
44	March 20, 1956^{A}	New York, NY	No. 3 Dayton	72–68
45	January 13, 1957	Cincinnati, OH	Dayton	61–59
46	February 20, 1957	Dayton, OH	Xavier	68–65
47	January 29, 1958	Dayton, OH	No. 16 Dayton	74–59
48	February 16, 1958	Cincinnati, OH	No. 14 Dayton	64–58
49	March 22, 1958^{B}	New York, NY	Xavier	78–74^{OT}
50	January 14, 1959	Dayton, OH	Dayton	60–56
51	March 8, 1959	Cincinnati, OH	Xavier	71–69
52	January 6, 1960	Dayton, OH	Dayton	54–51
53	February 24, 1960	Cincinnati, OH	Dayton	91–82
54	January 28, 1961	Cincinnati, OH	Dayton	87–64
55	February 22, 1961	Dayton, OH	Dayton	94–71
56	January 3, 1962	Dayton, OH	Dayton	64–48
57	February 7, 1962	Cincinnati, OH	Xavier	72–71
58	January 3, 1963	Cincinnati, OH	Dayton	69–64
59	February 6, 1963	Dayton, OH	Dayton	79–63
60	January 4, 1964	Dayton, OH	Xavier	103–94
61	February 1, 1964	Cincinnati, OH	Xavier	82–81
62	January 4, 1965	Cincinnati, OH	Dayton	83–79
63	February 3, 1965	Dayton, OH	Dayton	112–81
64	January 3, 1966	Dayton, OH	Dayton	105–79
65	February 9, 1966	Cincinnati, OH	Dayton	76–73
66	January 4, 1967	Cincinnati, OH	Dayton	75–72
67	February 8, 1967	Dayton, OH	Dayton	70–66
68	January 3, 1968	Cincinnati, OH	Dayton	83–80
69	February 7, 1968	Dayton, OH	Dayton	64–56
70	January 4, 1969	Cincinnati, OH	Xavier	59–55
71	January 27, 1969	Dayton, OH	No. 20 Dayton	72–64
72	January 3, 1970	Cincinnati, OH	Dayton	94–76
73	February 4, 1970	Dayton, OH	Dayton	90–78
74	February 15, 1971	Dayton, OH	Dayton	70–50
75	February 27, 1971	Cincinnati, OH	Dayton	82–76
76	December 12, 1971	Dayton, OH	Dayton	69–66
77	February 5, 1972	Cincinnati, OH	Xavier	77–66
78	January 6, 1973	Cincinnati, OH	Dayton	98–82
79	March 3, 1973	Dayton, OH	Dayton	87–81
80	January 9, 1974	Cincinnati, OH	Dayton	62–52
81	February 23, 1974	Dayton, OH	Dayton	86–55

No.	Date	Location	Winner	Score
82	December 7, 1974	Dayton, OH	Dayton	75–66
83	February 19, 1975	Cincinnati, OH	Dayton	78–67
84	January 3, 1976	Dayton, OH	Dayton	80–71
85	February 28, 1976	Cincinnati, OH	Dayton	77–75
86	January 8, 1977	Dayton, OH	Dayton	75–59
87	March 3, 1977	Cincinnati, OH	Dayton	86–48
88	January 7, 1978	Cincinnati, OH	Xavier	58–56
89	February 28, 1978	Dayton, OH	Dayton	90–62
90	December 30, 1978	Dayton, OH	Dayton	67–66
91	February 10, 1979	Cincinnati, OH	Dayton	75–54
92	January 19, 1980	Cincinnati, OH	Xavier	73–59
93	February 26, 1980	Dayton, OH	Dayton	73–60
94	January 10, 1981	Cincinnati, OH	Dayton	74–72
95	February 22, 1981	Dayton, OH	Dayton	73–64
96	December 12, 1981	Dayton, OH	Dayton	62–61
97	December 11, 1982	Dayton, OH	Dayton	63–53
98	February 29, 1984	Cincinnati, OH	Xavier	72–61
99	March 3, 1985	Dayton, OH	Dayton	66–56
100	February 25, 1986	Cincinnati, OH	Xavier	93–78
101	December 27, 1986	Dayton, OH	Dayton	69–65
102	February 27, 1988	Cincinnati, OH	Xavier	86–73
103	February 4, 1989	Dayton, OH	Xavier	82–78
104	March 4, 1989	Cincinnati, OH	Xavier	83–78
105	February 3, 1990	Cincinnati, OH	No. 23 Xavier	88–81
106	March 3, 1990	Dayton, OH	Dayton	111–108
107	March 10, 1990^{C}	Dayton, OH	Dayton	98–89
108	February 17, 1991	Dayton, OH	Dayton	83–79
109	March 2, 1991	Cincinnati, OH	Xavier	102–79
110	March 8, 1991^{D}	Dayton, OH	Xavier	90–71
111	January 21, 1992	Cincinnati, OH	Xavier	77–69
112	February 29, 1992	Dayton, OH	Xavier	72–56
113	January 16, 1993	Dayton, OH	Xavier	85–58
114	February 13, 1993	Cincinnati, OH	Xavier	53–46
115	January 12, 1994	Cincinnati, OH	No. 25 Xavier	57–46
116	January 24, 1994	Dayton, OH	Xavier	88–62
117	December 19, 1994	Cincinnati, OH	Xavier	99–73
118	January 27, 1996	Dayton, OH	Dayton	61–55
119	February 20, 1996	Cincinnati, OH	Xavier	102–95
120	January 7, 1997	Dayton, OH	Dayton	98–91
121	February 12, 1997	Cincinnati, OH	No. 19 Xavier	79–53
122	January 24, 1998	Dayton, OH	Dayton	93–82
123	March 1, 1998	Cincinnati, OH	Xavier	89–84
124	January 30, 1999	Dayton, OH	Dayton	91–86
125	February 24, 1999	Cincinnati, OH	Xavier	90–62
126	January 11, 2000	Dayton, OH	Dayton	76–72
127	February 2, 2000	Cincinnati, OH	Xavier	65–64^{OT}
128	January 30, 2001	Cincinnati, OH	Xavier	82–72
129	March 4, 2001	Dayton, OH	Dayton	65–62
130	January 5, 2002	Dayton, OH	Xavier	66–59
131	January 26, 2002	Cincinnati, OH	Xavier	75–59
132	March 8, 2002^{E}	Philadelphia, PA	No. 24 Xavier	66–59
133	February 8, 2003	Cincinnati, OH	No. 20 Xavier	85–77
134	February 22, 2003	Dayton, OH	No. 14 Xavier	73–72
135	January 31, 2004	Dayton, OH	Dayton	74–67
136	February 21, 2004	Cincinnati, OH	Xavier	67–60
137	March 13, 2004^{F}	Dayton, OH	Xavier	58–49
138	February 19, 2005	Dayton, OH	Dayton	59–55
139	March 5, 2005	Cincinnati, OH	Xavier	74–65
140	January 28, 2006	Cincinnati, OH	Xavier	60–55
141	February 21, 2006	Dayton, OH	Dayton	66–62
142	January 27, 2007	Cincinnati, OH	Xavier	83–67
143	February 24, 2007	Dayton, OH	Xavier	75–67
144	March 8, 2007^{G}	Atlantic City, NJ	Xavier	72–51
145	January 24, 2008	Cincinnati, OH	No. 23 Xavier	69–43
146	February 24, 2008	Dayton, OH	No. 10 Xavier	57–51
147	March 8, 2008^{H}	Atlantic City, NJ	No. 10 Xavier	74–65
148	February 11, 2009	Dayton, OH	Dayton	71–58
149	March 5, 2009	Cincinnati, OH	No. 17 Xavier	76–59
150	January 16, 2010	Cincinnati, OH	Xavier	78–74
151	February 6, 2010	Dayton, OH	Dayton	90–65
152	March 12, 2010^{I}	Atlantic City, NJ	No. 24 Xavier	78–73
153	January 15, 2011	Cincinnati, OH	Xavier	81–76
154	February 27, 2011	Dayton, OH	No. 25 Xavier	66–62
155	March 11, 2011^{J}	Atlantic City, NJ	Dayton	68–67
156	January 21, 2012	Dayton, OH	Dayton	87–72
157	February 18, 2012	Cincinnati, OH	Xavier	86–83^{OT}
158	March 9, 2012^{K}	Atlantic City, NJ	Xavier	70–69
159	January 30, 2013	Cincinnati, OH	Xavier	66–61
160	February 16, 2013	Dayton, OH	Dayton	70–59
161	November 29, 2015^{L}	Bay Lake, FL	No. 23 Xavier	90–61
Series: Dayton leads 85–76

=== Notes ===
^{A}1956 NIT Quarterfinals
^{B}1958 NIT Finals
^{C}1990 Midwestern Collegiate Conference tournament
^{D}1992 Midwestern Collegiate Conference tournament
^{E}2002 Atlantic 10 tournament
^{F}2004 Atlantic 10 tournament
^{G}2007 Atlantic 10 tournament
^{H}2008 Atlantic 10 tournament
^{I}2010 Atlantic 10 tournament
^{J}2011 Atlantic 10 tournament
^{K}2012 Atlantic 10 tournament
^{L}2015 Advocare Invitational

=== Game Most Valuable Players ===
Date	Most Valuable Player	Team
Jan 10, 1981	Mike Kanieski	Dayton
Feb 22, 1981	Mike Kanieski	Dayton
Dec 12, 1981	Kevin Conrad	Dayton
Dec 11, 1982	Roosevelt Chapman	Dayton
Feb 29, 1984	Victor Fleming	Xavier
Mar 3, 1985	Anthony Grant	Dayton
Feb 25, 1986	Walt McBride	Xavier
Dec 27, 1986	Anthony Corbitt	Dayton
Feb 27, 1988	Stan Kimbrough	Xavier
Feb 4, 1989	Stan Kimbrough	Xavier
Mar 4, 1989	Noland Robinson	Dayton
Feb 3, 1990	Jamal Walker	Xavier
Mar 3, 1990	Negele Knight	Dayton
Feb 17, 1991	Chip Jones	Dayton
Mar 2, 1991	Jamal Walker	Xavier
Jan 21, 1992	Aaron Williams	Xavier
Feb 29, 1992	Jamie Gladden	Xavier
Jan 16, 1993	Brian Grant	Xavier
Feb 13, 1993	Mark Poynter	Xavier
Jan 12, 1994	Steve Gentry	Xavier
Jan 29, 1994	Jeff Massey	Xavier
Dec 19, 1994	Larry Sykes	Xavier
Jan 27, 1996	Rodney Horton	Dayton
Feb 20, 1996	Gary Lumpkin	Xavier
Jan 7, 1997	Darnell Hoskins	Dayton
Feb 12, 1997	Torraye Braggs	Xavier
Jan 24, 1998	Ryan Perryman	Dayton
Mar 1, 1998	Torraye Braggs	Xavier
Jan 30, 1999	Coby Turner	Dayton
Feb 24, 1999	Lenny Brown	Xavier
Jan 11, 2000	David Morris	Dayton
Feb 2, 2000	Alvin Brown	Xavier
Jan 30, 2001	David West	Xavier
Mar 4, 2001	Yuanta Holland	Dayton
Jan 5, 2002	Romain Sato	Xavier
Jan 26, 2002	Lionel Chalmers	Xavier
Feb 8, 2003	David West	Xavier
Feb 22, 2003	David West	Xavier
Jan 31, 2004	Ramod Marshall	Dayton
Feb 21, 2004	Lionel Chalmers	Xavier
Feb 19, 2005	Marques Bennett	Dayton
Mar 5, 2005	Will Caudle	Xavier
Jan 28, 2006	Brian Thornton	Xavier
Feb 21, 2006	Norman Plummer	Dayton
Jan 27, 2007	Justin Doellman	Xavier
Feb 24, 2007	Drew Lavender	Xavier
Jan 24, 2008	Stanley Burrell	Xavier
Feb 24, 2008	Josh Duncan	Xavier
Feb 11, 2009	Chris Wright	Dayton
Mar 5, 2009	Dante' Jackson	Xavier
Jan 15, 2010	Jordan Crawford	Xavier
Feb 6, 2010	Chris Wright	Dayton
Jan 15, 2011	Tu Holloway	Xavier
Feb 27, 2011	Tu Holloway	Xavier
Jan 21, 2012	Kevin Dillard	Dayton
Feb 18, 2012	Tu Holloway	Xavier
Jan 31, 2013	Dee Davis	Xavier
Feb 15, 2013	Kevin Dillard	Dayton
