= 2003–04 Xavier Musketeers men's basketball team =

American college basketball season

2003–04 Xavier Musketeers men's basketball

Atlantic 10 tournament champions

NCAA tournament, Elite Eight
- Conference: Atlantic 10 Conference

Ranking
- Coaches: No. 14
- Record: 26–11 (10–6 A10)
- Head coach: Thad Matta (3rd season)
- Home arena: Cintas Center

2003–04 Atlantic 10 men's basketball standings
	Conf.				Overall
Team	W		L	PCT	W		L	PCT
East
No. 5 Saint Joseph's	16	–	0	1.000	30	–	2	.938
Temple	9	–	7	.563	15	–	14	.517
Rhode Island	7	–	9	.438	20	–	14	.588
UMass	4	–	12	.250	10	–	19	.345
St. Bonaventure	3	–	13	.188	7	–	21	.250
Fordham	3	–	13	.188	6	–	22	.214
West
Dayton	12	–	4	.750	24	–	9	.727
George Washington	11	–	5	.688	18	–	12	.600
Xavier †	10	–	6	.625	26	–	11	.703
Richmond	10	–	6	.625	20	–	13	.606
Duquesne	6	–	10	.375	12	–	17	.414
La Salle	5	–	11	.313	10	–	20	.333
† 2004 Atlantic 10 Tournament winner Rankings from AP Poll

The 2003–04 Xavier Musketeers men's basketball team represented Xavier University from Cincinnati, Ohio in the 2003–04 season. Led by head coach Thad Matta, the Musketeers finished 19–10 in the regular season, and won the Atlantic 10 tournament. In the NCAA tournament, the Musketeers put on an unexpected performance, battling all the way to the Elite Eight, eventually falling to Duke. Following the season, Matta would depart to become the head coach of Ohio State.

== Roster ==
2003–04 Xavier Musketeers men's basketball team
Players
Coaches

Pos.	#	Name	Height	Weight	Year	Hometown
G	0	Lionel Chalmers	6 ft 0 in (1.83 m)	180 lb (82 kg)	Sr	Albany, New York
G	10	Romain Sato	6 ft 5 in (1.96 m)	205 lb (93 kg)	Sr

Head coach

- Thad Matta (Butler)

Assistant coach(es)

Legend

- (C) Team captain
- (S) Suspended
- (I) Ineligible
- (W) Walk-on
- Injured
- Current redshirt

== Tournament results ==
=== Atlantic 10 tournament ===
3/10/04 @ University of Dayton Arena, Dayton, OH Vs. St. Bonaventure, W, 90–64
3/11/04 @ University of Dayton Arena, Dayton, OH Vs. St. Joseph's, W, 87–67
3/12/04 @ University of Dayton Arena, Dayton, OH Vs. George Washington, W, 70–47
3/13/04 @ University of Dayton Arena, Dayton, OH Vs. Dayton, W, 58–49

=== NCAA tournament ===
3/19/04 @ TD Waterhouse Centre, Orlando, FL Vs. (10) Louisville W, 80–70 (first round)
3/21/04 @ TD Waterhouse Centre, Orlando, FL Vs. (2) Mississippi State W, 89–74 (second round)
3/26/04 @ Georgia Dome, Atlanta, GA Vs. (3) Texas W, 79–71 (Sweet Sixteen)
3/28/04 @ Georgia Dome, Atlanta, GA Vs. (1) Duke L, 66–63 (Elite Eight)

== NBA draft ==
Round	Pick	Player	NBA club
2	33	Lionel Chalmers	Los Angeles Clippers
2	52	Romain Sato	San Antonio Spurs
