= Dwayne Jones (basketball) =

American basketball player (born 1983)

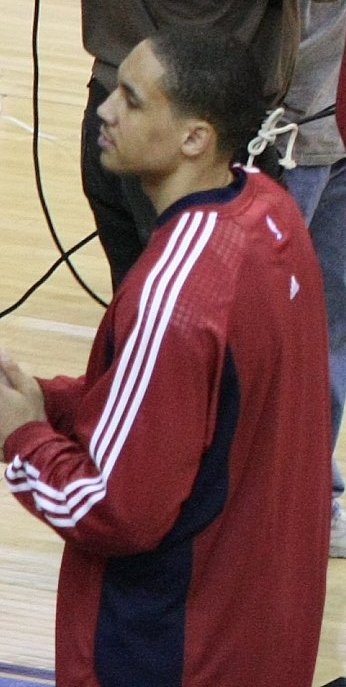
- Jones with the Cleveland Cavaliers in 2008

Saint Joseph's Hawks
- Title: Assistant coach
- League: Atlantic 10 Conference

Personal information
- Born: June 9, 1983 (age 43) Morgantown, West Virginia, U.S.
- Listed height: 6 ft 11 in (2.11 m)
- Listed weight: 250 lb (113 kg)

Career information
- High school: American Christian School (Aston, Pennsylvania)
- College: Saint Joseph's (2002–2005)
- NBA draft: 2005: undrafted
- Playing career: 2005–2017
- Position: Power forward
- Number: 27, 21
- Coaching career: 2018–present

Career history

Playing
- 2005–2006: Florida Flame
- 2006: Boston Celtics
- 2006–2008: Cleveland Cavaliers
- 2008: Efes Pilsen
- 2008: Charlotte Bobcats
- 2009: Iowa Energy
- 2009: Idaho Stampede
- 2009–2010: Austin Toros
- 2010: Phoenix Suns
- 2010–2011: Fujian Xunxing
- 2011: Indios de Mayagüez
- 2011: Zhejiang Lions
- 2012: Powerade Tigers
- 2012: Champville SC
- 2013: Texas Legends
- 2013: Golden State Warriors
- 2013–2014: Al Jaysh
- 2015: Guaiqueríes de Margarita
- 2015: Leones de Santo Domingo
- 2015–2016: Juventud Sionista
- 2015: Guaiqueríes de Margarita
- 2016–2017: Atenas de Córdoba

Coaching
- 2018–2019: Philadelphia 76ers (player development)
- 2021–2023: Philadelphia 76ers (assistant)
- 2023–present: Saint Joseph's (assistant)

Career highlights
- CBA rebounding leader (2011); All-NBA D-League First Team (2010); Atlantic 10 Defensive Player of the Year (2005); Second-team All-Atlantic 10 (2005)
- Stats at NBA.com
- Stats at Basketball Reference

Dwayne Clinton Jones (born June 9, 1983) is an American basketball coach and former professional player who is an assistant coach for the Saint Joseph's Hawks of the Atlantic 10 Conference.

== Early life ==
Jones was born in Morgantown, West Virginia and raised in Chester, Pennsylvania. Jones graduated from the American Christian School of Aston, Pennsylvania in 2001.

== College career ==
Along with senior Jameer Nelson and juniors Delonte West and Pat Carroll, Jones was an integral part of the undefeated Saint Joseph's team during the 2004 regular season. The Hawks earned a #1 seed in the NCAA Tournament and advanced to the Elite Eight. They were within seconds of the Final Four, before the Oklahoma State Cowboys' John Lucas III hit a 3-pointer. Saint Joseph's finished with a 30–2 record, the best in the University's history.

In 2004–05, Jones was the Atlantic 10 Defensive Player of the Year, and a member of the All-Defensive Team for the second consecutive year. He ranked fifth in rebounds (11.6) and blocks (3.0) in the nation, and led the Atlantic 10 in both categories.

Jones was named second-team All-Atlantic 10 and All-Big 5, while posting career-best numbers in scoring (10.1 points per game), rebounding and blocked shots. He was also named to the Atlantic 10 All-Championship Team after averaging 10.0 points and 12.7 rebounds in the tournament, and earned NIT All-Tournament honors.

Jones' total of 418 rebounds was the second best single-season mark in school history, while his total of 109 blocks was the third best single-season total. He set his career-high with 16 rebounds at Old Dominion and tied it with 16 against Hofstra. On February 19, 2005, Jones became the first Hawk to notch a triple-double since 1986 with 11 points, 11 rebounds, and career-high 10 blocks against St. Bonaventure.

== Professional career ==
Jones was signed by the Minnesota Timberwolves on August 26, 2005, as an undrafted rookie free agent. He was assigned to the NBA Development League's Florida Flame on November 4, 2005.

In 26 games for the Flame, Jones averaged 8.9 points, 2.0 blocks (league's third-best, with the total 52 being fifth) and a league leading 11.7 rebounds per game. He also led the league in offensive rebounds per game (4.5), and his 118 total offensive rebounds were good for second place, only eight shy of T. J. Cummings, who played in 22 more games.

Without a single official appearance for the Wolves, Jones was traded to the Boston Celtics on January 27, 2006, along with Michael Olowokandi, Wally Szczerbiak and a future first-round draft choice, in exchange for Marcus Banks, Mark Blount, Ricky Davis, Justin Reed and two future conditional second-round draft choices. He played in 14 games for the Celtics during the season, averaging 1.0 points and 2.2 rebounds. Jones had a season high seven points on April 19, 2006 against the Miami Heat and a career high 13 rebounds on April 17, 2006 against the Cleveland Cavaliers.

Jones was traded to the Cavaliers on October 13, 2006, in exchange for Luke Jackson, and appeared in just 4 regular season games during the 2006–2007 season. He had three total points (on 3–6 free throw shooting, against the Golden State Warriors) and six total rebounds.

Jones was assigned by the Cavaliers to the D-League's Albuquerque Thunderbirds on March 23, 2007. He played in two games for the Thunderbirds, averaging 11.5 points, 11.5 rebounds, six blocks and two steals, including D-League season-high eight blocks on March 24, 2007 against the Idaho Stampede.

In his first full season as an NBA player, Jones averaged 1 point and 2 rebounds in 56 games during 2007–08, plus 5 postseason contests. He had a season and career-high nine points and a season-high 12 rebounds on December 4, 2007 against the New Jersey Nets.

In September 2008, Jones was signed by the Orlando Magic to play in the team's training camp, but was released before the season started. He then signed with Turkish League club Efes Pilsen S.K., which also entered the Euroleague.

On November 24, 2008, Jones signed with the Charlotte Bobcats.

On January 8, 2009, Jones was acquired by the Iowa Energy of the NBA Development League. He was later traded to the Idaho Stampede for guard Tim Barnes, and then finished the season with the Austin Toros.

On October 17, 2009, Jones signed a one-year contract with Serbian club Crvena zvezda. He was signed as their final newcomer for the 2009–10 season. He was released by mutual consent only 5 days after that, due to, as Crvena zvezda general manager said, personal problems that kept him from focusing on professional basketball. During those five days in Belgrade, he played in one friendly game versus a minor league team, contributing to the win with 9 points and 5 rebounds. Jones later rejoined the Austin Toros.

On April 6, 2010, he was signed by the Phoenix Suns. He was signed to replace Robin Lopez because of a bulging disk and he was the top rebounder in the Development League, averaging 16 rebounds for the Austin Toros.

On July 14, 2010 he was traded to the Toronto Raptors along with Leandro Barbosa in exchange for Hedo Türkoğlu. However, he was waived by the Raptors on August 13. He then re-signed with the Suns on August 30, but he was waived on October 20, 2010. He also played for Fujian SBS Xunxing in China for 2010–11 season.

In May 2011, he signed with Indios de Mayagüez in Puerto Rico. He then joined Zhejiang Guangsha in China.

In January 2012, he signed with the Powerade Tigers as an import for the 2012 PBA Commissioner's Cup.

On February 7, 2013, Jones was acquired by the Texas Legends of the NBA D-League. On April 17, 2013, he was signed by the Golden State Warriors for the remainder of the season. On July 24, 2013, he was waived by the Warriors.

On September 30, 2013, he signed with the Utah Jazz. However, he was waived on October 14.

In November 2014, Jones signed with Guaiqueríes de Margarita of Venezuela for the 2015 LPB season.

In June 2015, he signed with Leones de Santo Domingo of Dominican Republic for the 2015 LNB season.

On June 27, 2016, Jones signed with Atenas de Córdoba for the 2016–17 season.

== Career statistics ==
Legend
GP	Games played	GS	Games started	MPG	Minutes per game
FG%	Field goal percentage	3P%	3-point field goal percentage	FT%	Free throw percentage
RPG	Rebounds per game	APG	Assists per game	SPG	Steals per game
BPG	Blocks per game	PPG	Points per game	**Bold**	Career high

=== College ===
Year	Team	GP	GS	MPG	FG%	3P%	FT%	RPG	APG	SPG	BPG	PPG
2002–03	Saint Joseph's	30	1	21.0	.526	–	.351	6.3	0.3	0.4	2.0	4.2
2003–04	Saint Joseph's	32	32	27.1	**.545**	–	.452	7.0	**0.9**	**0.5**	2.0	6.4
2004–05	Saint Joseph's	**36**	**36**	**34.8**	.507	–	**.536**	**11.6**	**0.9**	0.4	**3.0**	**10.1**
Career		98	69	28.1	.522	–	.484	8.5	0.7	0.4	2.4	7.1

=== NBA regular season ===
Year	Team	GP	GS	MPG	FG%	3P%	FT%	RPG	APG	SPG	BPG	PPG
2005–06	Boston	14	0	6.2	.400	–	.462	2.2	0.1	0.1	0.2	1.0
2006–07	Cleveland	4	0	4.5	.000	–	.500	1.5	0.0	0.0	0.0	0.8
2007–08	Cleveland	**56**	0	8.4	.532	.000	.483	**2.5**	**0.2**	**0.2**	**0.4**	1.4
2008–09	Charlotte	6	0	**8.7**	**.571**	–	**.667**	2.0	0.0	0.0	0.2	**2.0**
2009–10	Phoenix	2	0	3.5	–	–	–	1.0	0.0	0.0	0.0	0.0
Career		82	0	7.8	.508	.000	.494	2.3	0.1	0.1	0.4	1.3

=== NBA postseason ===
Year	Team	GP	GS	MPG	FG%	3P%	FT%	RPG	APG	SPG	BPG	PPG
2007–08	Cleveland	**5**	0	4.0	**.500**	–	.500	1.2	0.0	0.0	**0.2**	0.6
2009–10	Phoenix	2	0	**5.0**	**.500**	–	**.750**	**2.5**	0.0	0.0	0.0	**2.5**
2012–13	Golden State	2	0	1.0	–	–	–	0.0	0.0	0.0	0.0	0.0
Career		9	0	3.6	.500	–	.667	1.2	0.0	0.0	0.1	0.9
