= 2003–04 Richmond Spiders men's basketball team =

American college basketball season

2003–04 Richmond Spiders men's basketball

NCAA tournament, 1st round
- Conference: Atlantic 10 Conference
- West
- Record: 20–13 (10–6 A-10)
- Head coach: Jerry Wainwright (2nd season)
- Home arena: Robins Center

2003–04 Atlantic 10 men's basketball standings
	Conf.				Overall
Team	W		L	PCT	W		L	PCT
East
No. 5 Saint Joseph's	16	–	0	1.000	30	–	2	.938
Temple	9	–	7	.563	15	–	14	.517
Rhode Island	7	–	9	.438	20	–	14	.588
UMass	4	–	12	.250	10	–	19	.345
St. Bonaventure	3	–	13	.188	7	–	21	.250
Fordham	3	–	13	.188	6	–	22	.214
West
Dayton	12	–	4	.750	24	–	9	.727
George Washington	11	–	5	.688	18	–	12	.600
Xavier †	10	–	6	.625	26	–	11	.703
Richmond	10	–	6	.625	20	–	13	.606
Duquesne	6	–	10	.375	12	–	17	.414
La Salle	5	–	11	.313	10	–	20	.333
† 2004 Atlantic 10 Tournament winner Rankings from AP Poll

The 2003–04 Richmond Spiders men's basketball team represented the University of Richmond in National Collegiate Athletic Association (NCAA) Division I college basketball during the 2003–04 season. Richmond competed as a member of the Atlantic 10 Conference (A-10) under second-year head basketball coach Jerry Wainwright and played its home games at the Robins Center.

Richmond finished third in the A-10 West regular-season standings with a 10–6 conference record, and lost in the semifinal round of the A-10 tournament. The Spiders received an at-large bid to the 2004 NCAA tournament as No. 11 seed in the East region. In the opening round, the Spiders lost to No. 6 seed Wisconsin, 76–64, to finish with a 20–13 record.

== Roster ==
2003–04 Richmond Spiders men's basketball team
Players
Coaches

Pos.	#	Name	Height	Weight	Year	Previous school	Hometown
G	1	Tony Dobbins	6 ft 4 in (1.93 m)	190 lb (86 kg)	Sr		Washington, D.C.
F	22	Mike Skrocki	6 ft 6 in (1.98 m)	190 lb (86 kg)	Sr		Howell, New Jersey

Head coach

- Jerry Wainwright

Assistant coach(es)

Legend

- (C) Team captain
- (S) Suspended
- (I) Ineligible
- (W) Walk-on
- Injured
- Current redshirt

== Schedule and results ==
Date time, TV	Rank^{#}	Opponent^{#}	Result	Record	Site city, state
Non-conference regular season
Nov 17, 2003*		Mississippi Valley State	W 62–46	1–0	Robins Center; Richmond, Virginia
Nov 18, 2003*		New Hampshire	W 63–49	2–0	Robins Center; Richmond, Virginia
Nov 24, 2003*		vs. San Francisco; Guardians Classic	W 66–59	3–0	Municipal Auditorium; Kansas City, Missouri
Nov 25, 2003*		vs. South Carolina; Guardians Classic	L 61–67	3–1	Municipal Auditorium; Kansas City, Missouri
A-10 Regular season
Mar 6, 2004		UMass	W 69–65	18–11 (10–6)	Robins Center; Richmond, Virginia
A-10 Tournament
Mar 10, 2004*		vs. Fordham; Quarterfinals	W 67–47	19–11	University of Dayton Arena; Dayton, Ohio
Mar 11, 2004*		vs. Temple; Semifinals	W 64–49	20–11	University of Dayton Arena; Dayton, Ohio
Mar 12, 2004*		at Dayton; Championship game	L 56–58	20–12	University of Dayton Arena; Dayton, Ohio
NCAA tournament
Mar 19, 2004*; CBS	(11 E)	vs. (6 E) No. 10 Wisconsin; First round	L 64–76	20–13	Bradley Center; Milwaukee, Wisconsin
*Non-conference game. ^{#}Rankings from AP poll. (#) Tournament seedings in parentheses. E=East. All times are in Eastern.
