= 2003–04 Temple Owls men's basketball team =

American college basketball season

2003–04 Temple Owls men's basketball

NIT, First Round
- Conference: Atlantic 10 Conference
- Record: 15–14 (9–7 A-10)
- Head coach: John Chaney (22nd season)
- Assistant coaches: Dan Leibovitz (8th season); Bill Ellerbee (2nd season); Mark Macon (2nd season)
- Home arena: Liacouras Center

2003–04 Atlantic 10 men's basketball standings
	Conf.				Overall
Team	W		L	PCT	W		L	PCT
East
No. 5 Saint Joseph's	16	–	0	1.000	30	–	2	.938
Temple	9	–	7	.563	15	–	14	.517
Rhode Island	7	–	9	.438	20	–	14	.588
UMass	4	–	12	.250	10	–	19	.345
St. Bonaventure	3	–	13	.188	7	–	21	.250
Fordham	3	–	13	.188	6	–	22	.214
West
Dayton	12	–	4	.750	24	–	9	.727
George Washington	11	–	5	.688	18	–	12	.600
Xavier †	10	–	6	.625	26	–	11	.703
Richmond	10	–	6	.625	20	–	13	.606
Duquesne	6	–	10	.375	12	–	17	.414
La Salle	5	–	11	.313	10	–	20	.333
† 2004 Atlantic 10 Tournament winner Rankings from AP Poll

The 2003–04 Temple Owls men's basketball team represented Temple University in the 2003–04 NCAA Division I men's basketball season. They were led by head coach John Chaney and played their home games at the Liacouras Center. The Owls are members of the Atlantic 10 Conference.

On December 20, 2003, Temple lost to Miami (FL) in the Orange Bowl Basketball Classic 72-66.

The Owls finished the season 15–14, 9–7 in A-10 play, and reached the 2004 National Invitation Tournament, where they lost in the first round to Rutgers 76-71.

== Roster ==
#	Name	Height	Weight (lbs.)	Position	Class	Hometown		High school
1	[Tyreek Byard]	6 ft 5 in (1.96 m)	175 pounds (79 kg)	G	Fr.	Philadelphia, Pennsylvania	U.S.	Franklin Learning Center
2	[ Wilbur Allen]	6 ft 4 in (1.93 m)	200 pounds (91 kg)	G	Jr.	Mouth of Wilson, Virginia	U.S.	Oak Hill Academy
3	[Dustin Salisbery]	6 ft 5 in (1.96 m)	205 pounds (93 kg)	G	Fr.	Lancaster, Pennsylvania	U.S.	J.P. McCaskey HS
4	[ Dion Dacons]	6 ft 6 in (1.98 m)	210 pounds (95 kg)	F	Fr.	Statesville, North Carolina	U.S.	Oak Hill Academy
10	[ Robert Allen]	5 ft 7 in (1.70 m)	160 pounds (73 kg)	G	Fr.	Selma, Alabama	U.S.	Selma HS
21	[ Michael Blackshear]	6 ft 6 in (1.98 m)	215 pounds (98 kg)	F	So.	Philadelphia, Pennsylvania	U.S.	Simon Gratz HS
22	[ Mario Taybron]	6 ft 2 in (1.88 m)	195 pounds (88 kg)	G	Fr.	Hampton, Virginia	U.S.	Ryan Academy Of Norfolk
24	Antywane Robinson	6 ft 8 in (2.03 m)	210 pounds (95 kg)	F	So.	Charlotte, North Carolina	U.S.	Oak Hill Academy
25	Mardy Collins	6 ft 6 in (1.98 m)	205 pounds (93 kg)	G	So.	Philadelphia, Pennsylvania	U.S.	Simon Gratz HS
33	[ Nehemiah Ingram]	6 ft 8 in (2.03 m)	250 pounds (110 kg)	F	So.	Milledgeville, Georgia	U.S.	Baldwin HS
34	David Hawkins	6 ft 4 in (1.93 m)	215 pounds (98 kg)	G	Sr.	Washington, DC	U.S.	National Christian Academy
43	[ Marcus Johnson]	6 ft 0 in (1.83 m)	154 pounds (70 kg)	F	Fr.	Salisbury, Maryland	U.S.	Strawberry Mansion HS
44	[Keith Butler]	7 ft 1 in (2.16 m)	255 pounds (116 kg)	C	Fr.	West Medford, Massachusetts	U.S.	Philadelphia Christian Academy
50	[ Wayne Marshall]	6 ft 11 in (2.11 m)	285 pounds (129 kg)	C	Fr.	Philadelphia, Pennsylvania	U.S.	Martin Luther King HS
