= Tom Blackburn (basketball) =

American basketball coach (1906–1964)

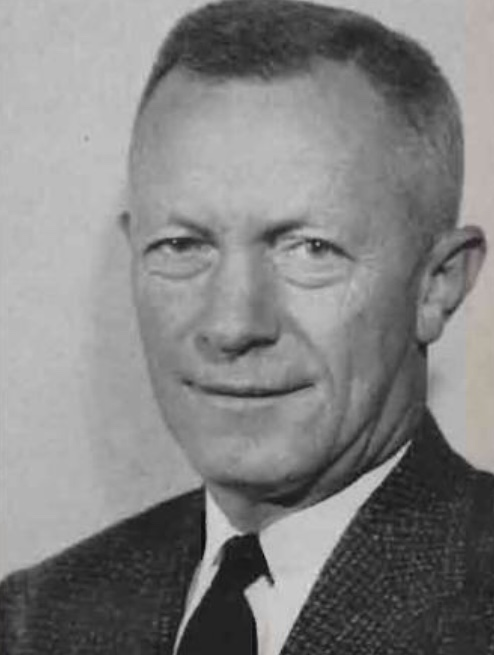
- Blackburn from the 1956 Daytonian

Biographical details
- Born: January 23, 1906; Peebles, Ohio, U.S.
- Died: March 6, 1964 (aged 58); Dayton, Ohio, U.S.
- Education: Wilmington College

Coaching career (HC unless noted)
- 1947–1964: Dayton

Head coaching record
- Overall: 352–141
- Tournaments: 1–1 (NCAA); 20–10 (NIT)

Accomplishments and honors

Championships
- NIT (1962)

Leonard Thomas Blackburn (January 23, 1906 – March 6, 1964) was an American basketball coach. The Peebles, Ohio native served as head men's basketball coach at the University of Dayton in Dayton, Ohio, from 1947 until his death in 1964. He led the Dayton Flyers to a championship at the 1962 National Invitation Tournament.

== Early life ==
Blackburn was born in 1906. He was employed as a steelworker for two years before enrolling at Wilmington College where he played football, basketball and baseball. After graduation, he coached high school basketball for four years in West Carrollton, Ohio and eight seasons at Xenia, Ohio Central High School, where six of his eight teams won championships, including the state title in 1942.

In World War II, Blackburn joined the Navy physical education program at Chapel Hill, North Carolina. After the war, he became a golf pro in North Carolina.

== Head coaching career ==
Blackburn became Dayton's first full-time basketball coach in 1947, inheriting a moribund team that had won seven total games over the previous two seasons. Blackburn's insistence on strict discipline within his program helped lift Dayton to national prominence in the following years. Blackburn's second team finished with a winning record and was invited to the National Catholic Invitational post-season tournament. Two years later, Blackburn's Flyers would receive the first of 10 NIT invitations. Blackburn established Dayton as a national college basketball powerhouse through the 1950s and early 1960s, advancing to the NIT Finals six times in what at the time was regarded as the more prestigious post season college basketball tournament. Blackburn had a 352–141 record (.714) in 17 seasons as the Flyers head coach, held a 22–12 record (.647) in postseason play, and won an NIT championship in 1962. Blackburn fell ill with cancer during the 1963–64 season, but coached the Flyers through all but the final three games before stepping down. Assistant coach Don Donoher served as interim coach for the rest of the season, though Dayton credits the entire season to Blackburn. Blackburn died on March 6, 1964, eight days after his last game on the Flyers bench.

== Awards and recognition ==
The University of Dayton inducted Blackburn into its Athletics Hall of Fame in 1969, and named the playing court at the University of Dayton Arena after their former coach. The winner of the annual Dayton-Xavier basketball game is awarded the Blackburn/McCafferty Trophy, named for the two former basketball coaches at each university.

== Head coaching record ==
Record table
| Season | Team | Overall | Conference | Standing | Postseason |
|---|---|---|---|---|---|
Dayton Flyers (NCAA University Division independent) (1947–1964)
| 1947–48 | Dayton | 12–14 | | | |
| 1948–49 | Dayton | 16–14 | | | NCIT Quarterfinals |
| 1949–50 | Dayton | 24–8 | | | |
| 1950–51 | Dayton | 27–5 | | | NIT Runner-up |
| 1951–52 | Dayton | 28–5 | | | NCAA Regional Third Place, NIT Runner-up |
| 1952–53 | Dayton | 16–13 | | | |
| 1953–54 | Dayton | 25–7 | | | NIT quarterfinal |
| 1954–55 | Dayton | 25–4 | | | NIT Runner-up |
| 1955–56 | Dayton | 25–4 | | | NIT Runner-up |
| 1956–57 | Dayton | 19–9 | | | NIT quarterfinal |
| 1957–58 | Dayton | 25–4 | | | NIT Runner-up |
| 1958–59 | Dayton | 14–12 | | | |
| 1959–60 | Dayton | 21–7 | | | NIT quarterfinal |
| 1960–61 | Dayton | 20–9 | | | NIT Fourth Place |
| 1961–62 | Dayton | 24–6 | | | NIT Champion |
| 1962–63 | Dayton | 16–10 | | | |
| 1963–64 | Dayton | 15–10 | | | |
| Dayton: | | 352–141 (.714) | | | |
| Total: | | 352–141 (.714) | | | |
National champion Postseason invitational champion Conference regular season champion Conference regular season and conference tournament champion Division regular season champion Division regular season and conference tournament champion Conference tournament champion
