= 2003 Maui Invitational =

2003 Maui Invitational Tournament
- Season: 2003–04
- Teams: 8
- Finals site: Lahaina Civic Center, Maui, Hawaii
- Champions: Dayton (1st title)
- Runner-up: Hawai'i (1st title game)
- Semifinalists: San Diego State; Chaminade
- Winning coach: Brian Gregory (1st title)
- MVP: Keith Waleskowski (Dayton)

The 2003 Maui Invitational Tournament was an early-season college basketball tournament that was played, for the 20th time, from November 24 to November 26, 2003. The tournament began in 1984, and was part of the 2003–04 NCAA Division I men's basketball season. The tournament was played at the Lahaina Civic Center in Maui, Hawaii from November 24 to 26.

== Bracket ==
Fifth Place Game; November 26
Ohio State	67
Villanova	66
Seventh Place Game
Santa Clara	76
Central Michigan	62

Consolation 2nd Round; November 25
Santa Clara	51
Villanova	53
Ohio State	77
Central Michigan	71

First round November 24
Chaminade	52
Villanova	49
Hawai'i	56
Santa Clara	43
Ohio State	61
San Diego State	83
Dayton	82
Central Michigan	63

Semifinals; November 25
Chaminade	54
Hawai'i	68
San Diego State	71
Dayton	76

Championship; November 26
Hawai'i	72
Dayton	82
Third-place game
Chaminade	67
San Diego State	75
