= 2003–04 Saint Joseph's Hawks men's basketball team =

American college basketball season

2003–04 Saint Joseph's Hawks men's basketball

NCAA tournament, Elite Eight Atlantic 10 Regular Season Champions
- Conference: Atlantic 10

Ranking
- Coaches: No. 5
- AP: No. 5
- Record: 30–2 (16–0 Atlantic 10)
- Head coach: Phil Martelli (9th season)
- Assistant coaches: Mark Bass (5th season); Matt Brady (11th season); Monté Ross (8th season)
- Home arena: Alumni Memorial Fieldhouse

2003–04 Atlantic 10 men's basketball standings
	Conf.				Overall
Team	W		L	PCT	W		L	PCT
East
No. 5 Saint Joseph's	16	–	0	1.000	30	–	2	.938
Temple	9	–	7	.563	15	–	14	.517
Rhode Island	7	–	9	.438	20	–	14	.588
UMass	4	–	12	.250	10	–	19	.345
St. Bonaventure	3	–	13	.188	7	–	21	.250
Fordham	3	–	13	.188	6	–	22	.214
West
Dayton	12	–	4	.750	24	–	9	.727
George Washington	11	–	5	.688	18	–	12	.600
Xavier †	10	–	6	.625	26	–	11	.703
Richmond	10	–	6	.625	20	–	13	.606
Duquesne	6	–	10	.375	12	–	17	.414
La Salle	5	–	11	.313	10	–	20	.333
† 2004 Atlantic 10 Tournament winner Rankings from AP Poll

The 2003–04 Saint Joseph's Hawks men's basketball team represented Saint Joseph's University during the 2003–04 NCAA Division I men's basketball season. The group is one of 25 teams to finish the regular season undefeated in men's division I basketball. They were the last to do so until Wichita State did it in 2014. Under 9th-year head coach Phil Martelli, the Hawks held an overall record of 27–0 and a conference record of 16–0 in the regular season before losing to Xavier in the A-10 tournament and Oklahoma State in the East Regional Final of the NCAA tournament.

== Roster ==
2003–04 Saint Joseph's Hawks men's basketball team
Players
Coaches

Pos.	#	Name	Height	Weight	Year	Previous school	Hometown
G	3	Rob Sullivan	6 ft 1 in (1.85 m)	180 lb (82 kg)	So	LaSalle College High School	Philadelphia, PA
G	5	Dwayne Lee	6 ft 0 in (1.83 m)	180 lb (82 kg)	So		Jersey City, NJ
G	12	Tyrone Barley	6 ft 1 in (1.85 m)	185 lb (84 kg)	Sr		Newark, NJ
G	13	Chet Stachitas	6 ft 5 in (1.96 m)	195 lb (88 kg)	So		Ponte Vedra Beach, FL
G	14	Jameer Nelson	6 ft 0 in (1.83 m)	190 lb (86 kg)	Sr	Chester HS	Chester, PA
G	15	Delonte West	6 ft 3 in (1.91 m)	195 lb (88 kg)	Jr	Eleanor Roosevelt HS	Washington, D.C.
F/C	21	Dwayne Jones	6 ft 11 in (2.11 m)	250 lb (113 kg)	So	American Christian School	Morgantown, WV
G	33	Pat Carroll	6 ft 5 in (1.96 m)	190 lb (86 kg)	Jr	Hatboro-Horsham HS	Pittsburgh, PA
F	34	John Bryant	6 ft 7 in (2.01 m)	220 lb (100 kg)	Jr		Woodbridge, VA
F	40	Dave Mallon	6 ft 10 in (2.08 m)	240 lb (109 kg)	So		East Aurora, NY

Head coach

- Phil Martelli (Widener)

Assistant coach(es)

- Mark Bass (Saint Joseph's)
- Matt Brady (Siena)
- Monté Ross (Winston-Salem State)

Legend

- (C) Team captain
- (S) Suspended
- (I) Ineligible
- (W) Walk-on
- Injured
- Current redshirt

- Jameer Nelson, (20.6 ppg/4.7 rpg)
- Delonte West, (18.9 ppg/5.4 rpg)
- Dwayne Jones, (6.4 ppg/7.0 rpg)
- Pat Carroll, (10.1 ppg/3.6 rpg)
- Tyrone Barley, (7.2 pgg/1.0 rpg)
- Chet Stachitas
- John Bryant
- Dwayne Lee
- Dave Mallon
- Arvydas Lidzius
- Artur Surov
- Robert Hartshorn
- Brian Jesiolowski
- Rob Sullivan
- Andrew Koefer

== Schedule ==
Date time, TV	Rank^{#}	Opponent^{#}	Result	Record	Site (attendance) city, state
Regular season
11/14/2003*	No. 17	vs. No. 10 Gonzaga; Coaches vs. Cancer Classic	W 73–66	1–0	Madison Square Garden; New York, NY
11/24/2003*	No. 13	at Boston University	W 71–56	2–0	Case Gym; Boston, MA
11/29/2003*	No. 13	at Old Dominion	W 75–72	3–0	Chartway Arena; Norfolk, VA
12/2/2003*	No. 12	San Francisco	W 84–52	4–0	Alumni Memorial Fieldhouse; Philadelphia, PA
12/06/2003*	No. 12	at Penn; Philadelphia Big 5	W 67–59	5–0	Palestra; Philadelphia, PA
12/09/2003*	No. 12	Boston College	W 67–57	6–0	Alumni Memorial Fieldhouse; Philadelphia, PA
12/14/2003*	No. 12	vs. Drexel	W 92–70	7–0	Palestra; Philadelphia, PA
12/20/2003*	No. 11	vs. California	W 59–57	8–0	The Arena in Oakland; Oakland, CA
12/27/2003*	No. 10	Pacific	W 73–55	9–0	Alumni Memorial Fieldhouse; Philadelphia, PA
12/30/2003*	No. 10	at Delaware	W 75–54	10–0	Bob Carpenter Center; Newark, DE
01/03/2004	No. 10	George Washington	W 90–81	11–0 (1–0)	Alumni Memorial Fieldhouse; Philadelphia, PA
01/06/2004	No. 9	at Richmond	W 71–60	12–0 (2–0)	Robins Center; Richmond, VA
01/10/2004	No. 9	at Duquesne	W 78–61	13–0 (3–0)	A.J. Palumbo Center; Pittsburgh, PA
01/13/2004	No. 6	Fordham	W 79–35	14–0 (4–0)	Alumni Memorial Fieldhouse; Philadelphia, PA
01/17/2004	No. 6	at Xavier	W 81–73	15–0 (5–0)	Cintas Center; Cincinnati, OH
01/21/2004	No. 3	UMass	W 92–67	16–0 (6–0)	Alumni Memorial Fieldhouse; Philadelphia, PA
01/24/2004	No. 3	at St. Bonaventure	W 114–63	17–0 (7–0)	Reilly Center; Olean, NY
01/31/2004	No. 3	at Temple; Rivalry	W 83–71	18–0 (8–0)	Liacouras Center; Philadelphia, PA
02/02/2004*	No. 3	at Villanova; Holy War	W 74–67	19–0	Wachovia Center; Philadelphia, PA
02/07/2004	No. 3	vs. La Salle; Philadelphia Big 5	W 89–63	20–0 (9–0)	Palestra; Philadelphia, PA
02/11/2004	No. 3	Dayton	W 81–67	21–0 (10–0)	Alumni Memorial Fieldhouse; Philadelphia, PA
02/14/2004	No. 3	Rhode Island	W 73–59	22–0 (11–0)	Alumni Memorial Fieldhouse; Philadelphia, PA
02/18/2004	No. 2	at Fordham	W 72–54	23–0 (12–0)	Rose Hill Gymnasium; New York, NY
02/21/2004	No. 2	vs. Temple; Rivalry	W 76–53	24–0 (13–0)	Palestra; Philadelphia, PA
02/25/2004	No. 2	at UMass	W 83–58	25–0 (14–0)	Mullins Center; Amherst, MA
02/28/2004	No. 2	at Rhode Island	W 57–55	26–0 (15–0)	Ryan Center; Kingston, RI
03/02/2004	No. 2	St. Bonaventure	W 82–50	27–0 (15–0)	Alumni Memorial Fieldhouse; Philadelphia, PA
Atlantic 10 tournament
03/11/2004	(E1) No. 1	vs. (W4) Xavier; Quarterfinals	L 67–87	27–1	UD Arena; Dayton, OH
NCAA tournament
03/18/2004*	(1) No. 5	vs. (16) Liberty; First Round	W 82–63	28–1	HSBC Arena; Buffalo, NY
03/20/2004*	(1) No. 5	vs. (8) Texas Tech; Second Round	W 70–65	29–1	HSBC Arena; Buffalo, NY
03/25/2004*	(1) No. 5	vs. (4) No. 17 Wake Forest; Sweet Sixteen	W 84–80	30–1	Continental Airlines Arena; East Rutherford, NJ
03/27/2004*	(1) No. 5	vs. (2) No. 4 Oklahoma State; Elite Eight	L 62–64	30–2	Continental Airlines Arena; East Rutherford, NJ
*Non-conference game. ^{#}Rankings from AP Poll. (#) Tournament seedings in parentheses. All times are in Eastern Time.

== Rankings ==
Ranking movements Legend: ██ Increase in ranking ██ Decrease in ranking
	Week																		
Poll	Pre	1	2	3	4	5	6	7	8	9	10	11	12	13	14	15	16	17	Final
AP	17	13	12	12	11	10	10	9	6	3	3	3	3	2	2	2	1	5	Not released
Coaches	18	14	14	15	12	10	10	9	6	3	3	3	3	2	2	2	1	5	5

== Regular season ==
The Hawks dominated the regular season, going 27-0 . In the Atlantic 10 tournament, the Hawks received a #1 seed, which included a first-round bye. However, they lost badly to the Xavier Musketeers 87–67. Despite their early exit, the Hawks still received a #1 seed in the NCAA Tournament. The Hawks also won the Philadelphia Big 5, going 4–0.

== NCAA tournament ==
The Hawks received a #1 seed and defeated Liberty, Texas Tech, and Wake Forest in the First, second, and third rounds, respectively. In the Elite 8 match-up against Oklahoma State, the Hawks lost by 2 points. John Lucas III of Oklahoma State hit a go-ahead three with only a few seconds left. Jameer Nelson attempted to tie the game on the ensuing possession, but his 15 ft. shot fell short.

== Accolades ==
- Phil Martelli

AP College Coach of the Year
Naismith College Coach of the Year
Henry Iba Award
Adolph Rupp Cup
NABC Coach of the Year
Jim Phelan Award
A-10 Conference Coach of the Year

- Jameer Nelson

Naismith College Player of the Year
John R. Wooden Award
Oscar Robertson Trophy
Adolph Rupp Trophy
NABC Player of the Year
AP College Player of the Year
Sporting News Men's College Basketball Player of the Year
Robert V. Geasey Trophy
2004 NCAA Men's Basketball All-Americans
Bob Cousy Award
Frances Pomeroy Naismith Award
Lowe's Senior Class Award
A-10 Player of the Year

== Notes ==
- The Hawks progressed to the Elite Eight in the NCAA Tournament for the first time since 1981.
- Sports Illustrated named shouting Saint Joseph's staple chant, "The Hawk Will Never Die," as the number 12 thing "you gotta do before you graduate."
- The Hawks earned a spot in the Philadelphia Sports Hall of Fame after receiving the Pride of Philadelphia award in 2004.

== Draft list ==
- Jameer Nelson was the 20th draft pick in the NBA draft of 2004 by the Denver Nuggets.
- Delonte West was the 24th draft pick in the NBA draft of 2004 by the Boston Celtics.
- Pat Carroll was a second round draft pick in the NBA Development League draft of 2009 by the Iowa Energy.
- Dwayne Jones was signed as a free agent in 2005 by the Minnesota Timberwolves.
