= 2004 Atlantic 10 men's basketball tournament =

2004 Basketball tournament

- Classification: Division I
- Season: 2003–04
- Teams: 12
- Site: University of Dayton Arena; Dayton, Ohio
- Champions: Xavier (3rd title)
- Winning coach: Thad Matta (2nd title)
- MVP: Lionel Chalmers (Xavier)

2003–04 Atlantic 10 men's basketball standings
	Conf.				Overall
Team	W		L	PCT	W		L	PCT
East
No. 5 Saint Joseph's	16	–	0	1.000	30	–	2	.938
Temple	9	–	7	.563	15	–	14	.517
Rhode Island	7	–	9	.438	20	–	14	.588
UMass	4	–	12	.250	10	–	19	.345
St. Bonaventure	3	–	13	.188	7	–	21	.250
Fordham	3	–	13	.188	6	–	22	.214
West
Dayton	12	–	4	.750	24	–	9	.727
George Washington	11	–	5	.688	18	–	12	.600
Xavier †	10	–	6	.625	26	–	11	.703
Richmond	10	–	6	.625	20	–	13	.606
Duquesne	6	–	10	.375	12	–	17	.414
La Salle	5	–	11	.313	10	–	20	.333
† 2004 Atlantic 10 Tournament winner Rankings from AP Poll

The 2004 Atlantic 10 men's basketball tournament was played from March 10 to March 13, 2004, at the University of Dayton Arena in Dayton, Ohio. The winner was named champion of the Atlantic 10 Conference and received an automatic bid to the 2004 NCAA Men's Division I Basketball Tournament.

Xavier won the tournament by beating Dayton. The top two teams in each division received first-round byes. Saint Joseph's entered the tournament undefeated, but lost to Xavier in the quarterfinals. Dayton, Richmond, Saint Joseph's, and Xavier all received bids to the NCAA tournament, with the latter two teams losing in the regional finals.

== Bracket ==
First round Wednesday, March 10
W4	Xavier	90
E5	St. Bonaventure	65
E3	Rhode Island	55
W6	La Salle	42
E4	UMass	76
W5	Duquesne	79
W3	Richmond	67
E6	Fordham	47

Quarterfinals; Thursday, March 11
E1	#1 Saint Joseph's	67
W4	Xavier	87
W2	George Washington	79
E3	Rhode Island	50
W1	Dayton	69
W5	Duquesne	56
E2	Temple	49
W3	Richmond	64

Semifinals; Friday, March 12
W4	Xavier	70
W2	George Washington	47
W1	Dayton	58
W3	Richmond	56

Final; Saturday, March 13
W4	Xavier	58
W1	Dayton	49

All games played at University of Dayton Arena, Dayton, Ohio
