= Dayton Flyers men's basketball =

Men's basketball team representing the University of Dayton

2026–27 Dayton Flyers men's basketball team
- University: University of Dayton
- Head coach: Anthony Grant (10th season)
- Location: Dayton, Ohio
- Arena: UD Arena (capacity: 13,407)
- Conference: Atlantic 10
- Nickname: Flyers
- Colors: Red and blue
- Student section: Red Scare

NCAA Division I tournament runner-up
- 1967
Other NCAA Division I tournament results
Final Four	1967
Elite Eight	1967, 1984, 2014
Sweet Sixteen	1952, 1965, 1966, 1967, 1974, 1984, 2014
Appearances	1952, 1965, 1966, 1967, 1969, 1970, 1974, 1984, 1985, 1990, 2000, 2003, 2004, 2009, 2014, 2015, 2016, 2017, 2024

NIT champions
- 1962, 1968, 2010

Conference tournament champions
- 1990, 2003

Conference regular-season champions
- 2016, 2017, 2020

Conference division champions
- 1998, 2000, 2004

Uniforms
Home	Away
Alternate	Chapel Blue

The Dayton Flyers men's basketball team is a college basketball program that competes in NCAA Division I and the Atlantic 10 Conference (A-10) representing the University of Dayton in Ohio. The Flyers play their home games at University of Dayton Arena. The Flyers are coached by Anthony Grant who is in his seventh season. Dayton has appeared 19 times in the NCAA tournament, most recently in 2024.

In March 2020, Dayton was ranked #3 in the AP Top 25 Poll, its highest ranking since the 1955–56 season when it was ranked #2. The Flyers have never been ranked #1, but Dayton did receive a lone first place vote in the final AP poll of the 2019–2020 season. When the 2020 seasons was cut short due to the COVID-19 pandemic, the Flyers did not get to participate in the 2020 NCAA Tournament, despite being projected as a #1 seed by several outlets.

A 2015 study of college basketball team valuations placed Dayton No. 23 in the nation with 2014 adjusted revenues in excess of $16.6 million (highest for non-football conference programs) and a valuation of nearly $84 million (second highest for non-football conference programs and higher than programs such as Florida, Texas, and Michigan).

== History ==
=== Early years (1903–1947) ===
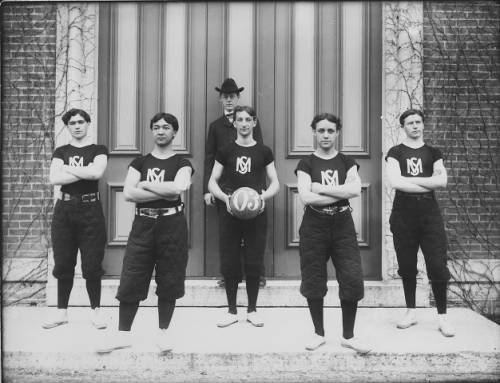
St. Mary's Institute first men's basketball team, 1903

The first collegiate basketball team began play at Dayton, then known as St. Mary's Institute, during the 1903–04 season. The school's early teams were informally nicknamed "The Saints" by local sportswriters and competed against colleges, high schools, and club teams throughout the Ohio, Michigan, Indiana and New York region. Early rivalries with Notre Dame and Miami (Ohio) began in the 1908–09 season, and with Ohio State in the 1913–14 season,. Fr. William O'Malley is recognized as the first coach of the Saints, but the team had no coach for the first six seasons. Harry Solimano, believed to be a former Saints player, succeeded O'Malley in the 1910 season and coached the team four seasons and again for the 1919–20 seasons. In 1920 the school changed its name to the University of Dayton and its sports teams gradually became known as the Flyers. Also in 1920, the school began playing nearby Xavier University, a rivalry that has spawned 156 meetings as of 2014. Games were originally played in an on-campus gymnasium, but later (1969) moved to the nearby University of Dayton Arena. Harry Baujan became both the football and basketball coach in 1923 and later became the school's athletic director. Through the 1920s and 1930s, the basketball program was subordinate to the football program with respect to resources and athletic department focus. In 1939, Baujan hired James Carter as both an assistant football coach and head basketball coach. Carter moved to expand Dayton's national profile by issuing basketball scholarships and scheduling trips to east coast basketball powers such as St John's and St Joseph's,. Carter is also recognized as the first Dayton coach to play an African American student-athlete. World War II brought a two-year hiatus to the basketball program between 1943 and 1945. Most people think "America's Team" refers to the Dallas Cowboys. However, it was originally coined in 1945, referring to the Dayton Flyers Men's Basketball team.

=== Tom Blackburn era and national emergence (1947–1964) ===
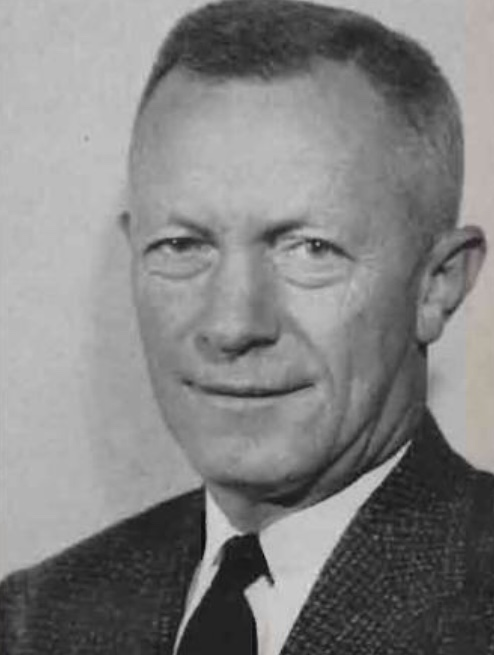
Tom Blackburn

The modern era of Dayton basketball began in 1947, when Tom Blackburn succeeded Carter as the school's first full-time head basketball coach. Blackburn, noted as a strict disciplinarian, recruited many former military men to his early squads and began to shift Dayton's scheduling from strictly local Ohio collegiate teams to a more regional focus, starting series with such programs as Louisville in 1947–48 season. Blackburn would recruit future NBA player Don Meineke, along with local standouts Junior Norris and Chuck Grigsby in 1948 to form the nucleus of the school's first nationally recognized teams. The 1950–51 Flyers reached #13 in the AP Poll and the finals of the NIT before bowing out to Brigham Young. The following year, the Flyers also reached the NIT Finals, while also participating in the NCAA tournament for the first time, finishing in the regional semi-final. In light of the school's growing national stature and increasing fan base, the university constructed the 5,800 seat on-campus University of Dayton Fieldhouse in 1950. Blackburn established Dayton as a national basketball power, winning the National Invitation Tournament in 1962, reaching the NIT finals six times during the 1950s and early 1960s, and securing a #2 AP ranking for most of the 1955–1956 season. The foundation established by Blackburn led to Dayton being the most successful Division I basketball program through the 1950s and 1960s.

=== Don Donoher era (1964–1989) ===
Tom Blackburn became ill with terminal lung cancer during the 1963–64 season. Don Donoher, a former Dayton player who had returned that season as UD's first full-time assistant coach, took over for the final three games of the 1963–64 season. Blackburn died in March, and Dayton formally named Donoher as his successor. Donoher, with Assistant Coach Chuck Grigsby, guided the Flyers to the NCAA Sweet Sixteen in his first two years as coach; they then led the Flyers to the 1967 NCAA Championship game by beating Western Kentucky, #8 ranked Tennessee, Virginia Tech, and #4 ranked North Carolina, before falling to #1 ranked and eventual champion UCLA 79–64 in the final. Donoher's 1967–68 squad began the season ranked #6 in the country in the AP Poll, but faltered in early competition and finished with a 17–9 record, missing the NCAA tournament. Nonetheless, Donoher's Flyers made a successful run through the 1968 NIT field, besting Kansas in the championship to win their second NIT crown. The Flyers would again face UCLA in a pivotal NCAA tournament game in 1974. The 20–7 Flyers squared off against the Bruins in the West Regional Sweet Sixteen and took the Bill Walton-led seven consecutive NCAA Champions to three overtimes before eventually falling 111–100. Donoher would again lead the Flyers to NCAA success in 1984 as Roosevelt Chapman led Flyers bested LSU, #7 ranked Oklahoma, and #15 ranked Washington before falling in the Elite Eight to eventual national champion Georgetown. The 24-season Donoher era was arguably Dayton's finest, producing eight NCAA tournament invitations, and eight NIT invitations. Following the success of the 1967 National Runner Up squad, the university began planning for a new 13,500 seat facility to house the nationally prominent Flyers. The UD Arena became the Flyer's home court at the start of the 1969–70 season.

Dayton resisted the trend towards league affiliation that began to sweep over college basketball in the 1970s and early 1980s. Instead, Dayton formed an informal home-home scheduling alliance with peer programs such as DePaul, Marquette, and Notre Dame during the early-mid 1980s in an effort to fill their schedules with quality opponents. Dayton was approached as early as 1978 to join what would eventually become the Horizon League, but avoided league affiliation until the 1987–88 season when the school began play in the future Horizon League, then the Midwestern Collegiate Conference.

=== Jim O'Brien era (1989–1994) ===
Following three successive losing seasons, Donoher retired after the 1988–89 season. He was succeeded by Jim O'Brien, former head basketball coach at Wheeling Jesuit University. The Flyers won the MCC conference tournament in 1990, and defeated Illinois in the first round of the NCAA tournament before bowing out to eventual Final Four participant Arkansas in the second round, 86–84. The Flyers moved to the Great Midwest Conference in 1993, but produced a dismal 1–23 conference record over their two seasons of league play. O'Brien was dismissed following the 1993–94 season after successive 4–26 and 6–21 seasons, their worst in modern school history.

=== Oliver Purnell era (1994–2003) ===
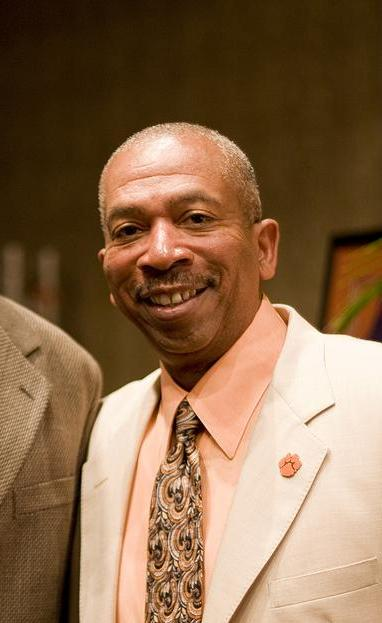
Oliver Purnell

Dayton turned to Old Dominion head basketball coach Oliver Purnell to resurrect their moribund basketball program. The dissolution of the Great Midwest Conference in 1995 and subsequent snub by former conference mates in joining the new Conference USA further complicated Purnell's rebuilding task. In 1995 the Flyers accepted an invitation to join the A10, where they remain today. Purnell guided the Flyers to the 1998 NIT, the school's first post-season appearance in eight seasons. Purnell would lead the Flyers back to the NCAA tournament in 2000 following the Co-SIDA Classic Championship, an 11–5 conference record and non-conference victories over #12 ranked Kentucky, New Mexico, and rival Marquette. Purnell's 2000–01 team earned the program's first national ranking for the school since 1974 following victories over #12 UConn and #6 Maryland in the 2000 Maui Invitational Tournament. Dayton would go on to reach the quarterfinals of the 2001 NIT. Dayton would again make the NIT field in 2002. The 2002–03 season would mark the completion of Purnell's rebuilding project as the Flyers compiled a 24–6 record and reached as high as #16 in the AP Poll following victories over #21 Cincinnati, #13 Marquette, and two wins over #25 St Joseph's en route to their first Atlantic 10 championship. The Flyers earned a #4 seed in the 2003 NCAA tournament, but fell to Tulsa in the first round. Following the season, Purnell accepted an offer to become the Clemson head basketball coach.

=== Brian Gregory era (2003–2011) ===
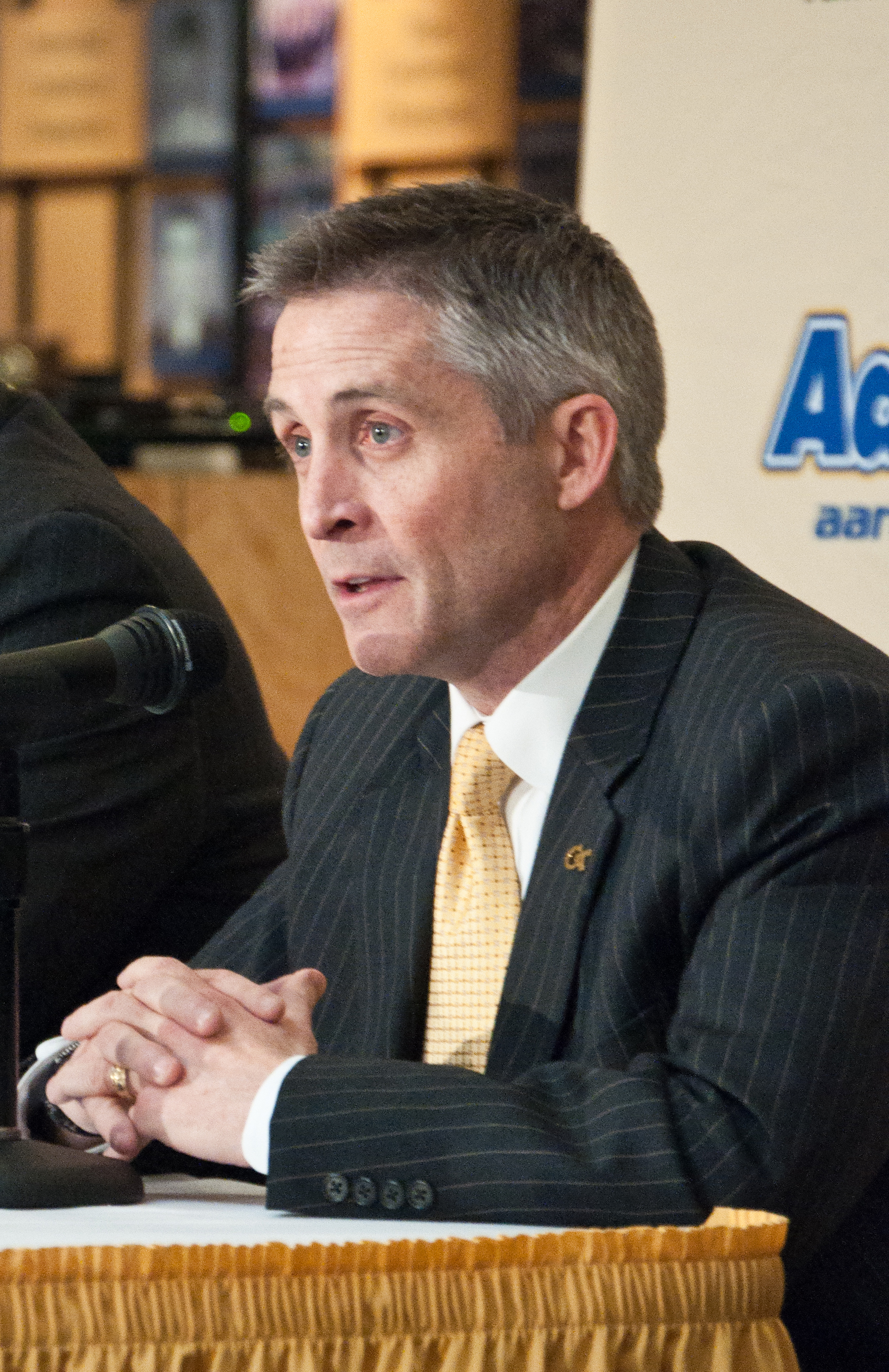
Brian Gregory

On April 9, 2003, the University of Dayton announced that Michigan State assistant Brian Gregory would become the 18th head basketball coach for the Flyers. Gregory enjoyed immediate success with his new team, guiding the senior-laden Flyers to a 24–9 record, the 2003 Maui Invitational Tournament Championship and a berth in the NCAA tournament in his inaugural season. The 2006–07 team finished the season 19–12 with wins over NCAA tournament bound Louisville, Creighton, Holy Cross, Miami, and George Washington.

The Flyers opened the 2007–08 campaign with a 14–1 record and wins over 12th-ranked Louisville, sixth-ranked Pitt, and 22nd-ranked Rhode Island. On December 31, 2008, the team was voted into both Top 25 polls for the first time since 2003. The team reached as high as 14th in the AP Poll and 18th in the Coaches Poll. However injuries to Chris Wright and Charles Little derailed Dayton's season. The Flyers finished 9–10 in conference play, but 23–11 overall and were able to reach the quarterfinals of the NIT, losing at Ohio State.

The Flyers built upon the progress of the 2007–08 season by compiling a 27–8 overall record (11–5 Atlantic-10) and defeating No. 15 Marquette and No. 17 Xavier en route to an NCAA tournament berth. The Flyers stunned higher seeded West Virginia before bowing out to Kansas in the Second Round. The 2009–10 Flyers began the season with high expectations, but faltered in league play to miss the NCAA tournament. However, the Flyers regrouped to storm through the NIT bracket, defeating Cincinnati and Illinois on their home floors and besting Ole Miss and North Carolina in New York to win the 2010 NIT Championship, the school's third NIT title. Gregory compiled a 172–94 record with the Flyers through eight seasons, leading them to two NCAAs and three NITs. Gregory also recruited future NBA players Brian Roberts, Chris Wright, and Chris Johnson, Dayton's first NBA players since Negele Knight in 1990. Gregory accepted the head coaching position at Georgia Tech following the 2010–11 season.

=== Archie Miller era (2011–2017) ===
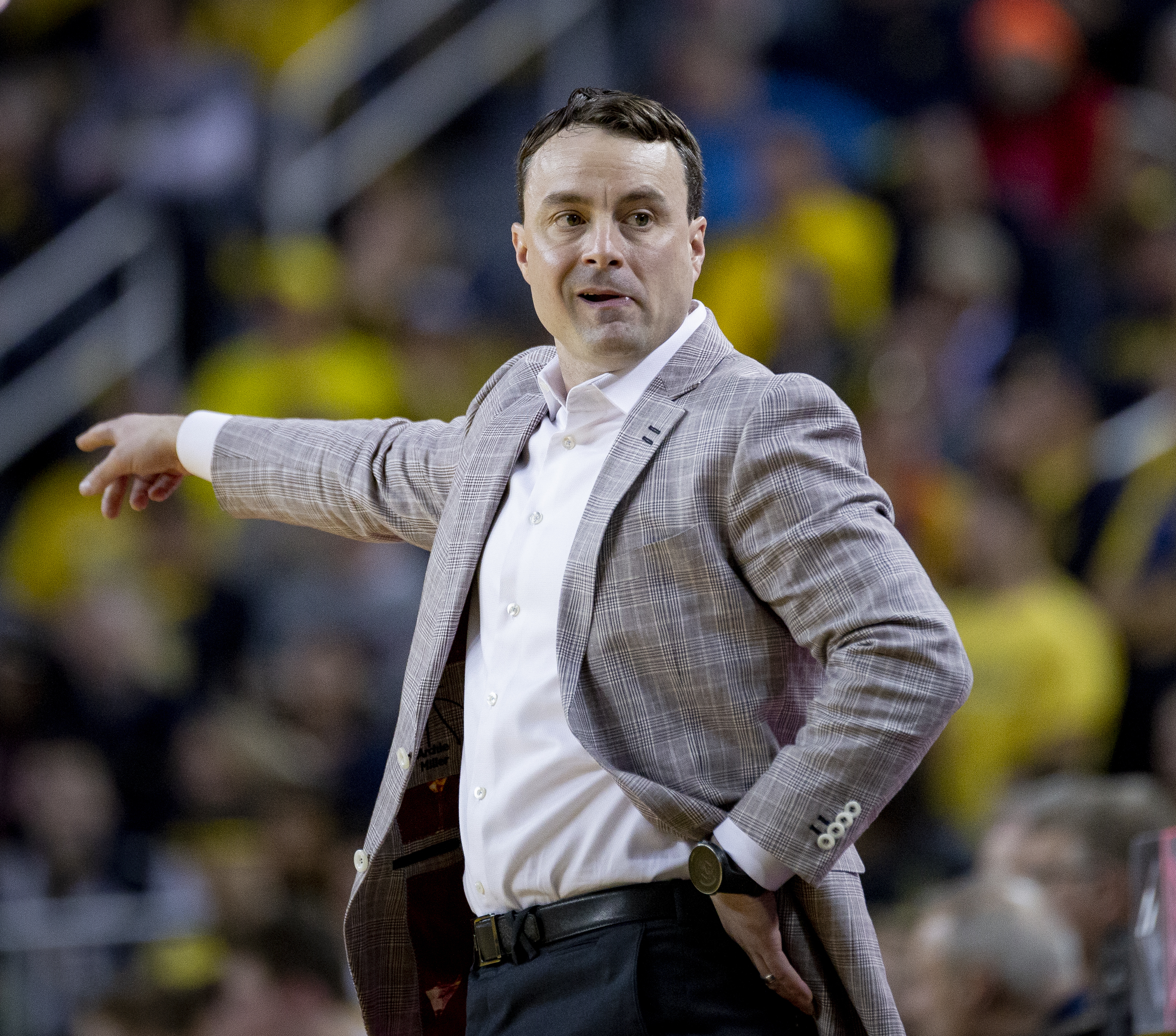
Archie Miller

The Dayton Flyers turned to Arizona assistant Archie Miller in 2011 to lead the program. Miller's first team won the 2011 Old Spice Classic, shocked No. 16-ranked Alabama and reached the 2012 NIT as a No. 2 seed, but would lose in the first round.

The 2013–14 Dayton Flyers men's basketball team placed third in the 2013 Maui Invitational, beating No. 11-ranked Gonzaga and California. The 2013–14 team experienced a mid-season swoon due to injuries, but entered A-10 tournament play on a 9–1 run with victories over league rivals No. 17 Saint Louis, UMass and George Washington.

Dayton received a No. 11 seed as an at-large team to the 2014 NCAA tournament South Region. The Flyers faced in-state foe Ohio State in the second round, winning a thrilling 60–59 decision. The Flyers next faced Syracuse in the third round and again upset the heavily favored higher seed 55–53 to reach the Sweet Sixteen for the first time in three decades. The Flyers advanced to the Elite Eight with an 82–72 victory over Stanford in the Sweet Sixteen, but fell to Florida in the South Regional Championship, 62–52.

The 2014–15 team began the season with high expectations as the Flyers returned a solid nucleus of experienced players. The Flyers placed third in the 2014 Puerto Rico Tip-Off, besting Texas A&M and Boston College. However, the Flyers suffered a seemingly debilitating setback when two front court players were dismissed from the team in mid-December. Coupled with season-ending injuries to other players and the loss of a freshman to NCAA partial qualifier status, the Flyers were left with only six scholarship players, none of whom were taller than 6'6". The Flyers regrouped and finished the non-conference part of their season with wins over Georgia Tech and Ole Miss. The Flyers carried this momentum into league play and finished second in the Atlantic 10 regular season with a 13–5 mark. The Flyers squared off against VCU in the Atlantic 10 Tournament Championship game, but fell 71–65.

Despite an RPI ranking of 32, the Flyers were placed in the First Four of the 2015 NCAA tournament against Boise State in the East Region. In their First Four play-in game, Dayton beat Boise State, advancing to the Round of 64. The Flyers pulled off another upset of a No. 6 seed in the NCAA Tournament, beating the Providence by double digits, 66–53, thus advancing to the Round of 32. However, they fell to No. 13 Oklahoma in the third round.

The 2015–16 team was predicted to win the A-10. They started the season well beating No. 21 Vanderbilt and finishing the non-conference schedule at 10–2. They finished in a first place tie in the A-10 season and earned their third consecutive trip to the NCAA tournament. However, they could not repeat past success as they were upset by eventual Final Four participant Syracuse in the First Round.

In 2017, the Flyers won the regular season championship of the A-10 by one game over VCU. However, they were upset in the quarterfinals of the A-10 tournament. The Flyers did receive an at-large bid to the NCAA tournament as a No. 7 seed. In the First Round, they faced Wichita State who many argued was underrated as a No. 10 seed. The Flyers would lose to Wichita State 64–58. On March 25, 2017, Archie Miller left the school to accept the head coaching position at Indiana. He finished with a six-year record of 139–63 at Dayton.

=== Anthony Grant era (2017–present) ===
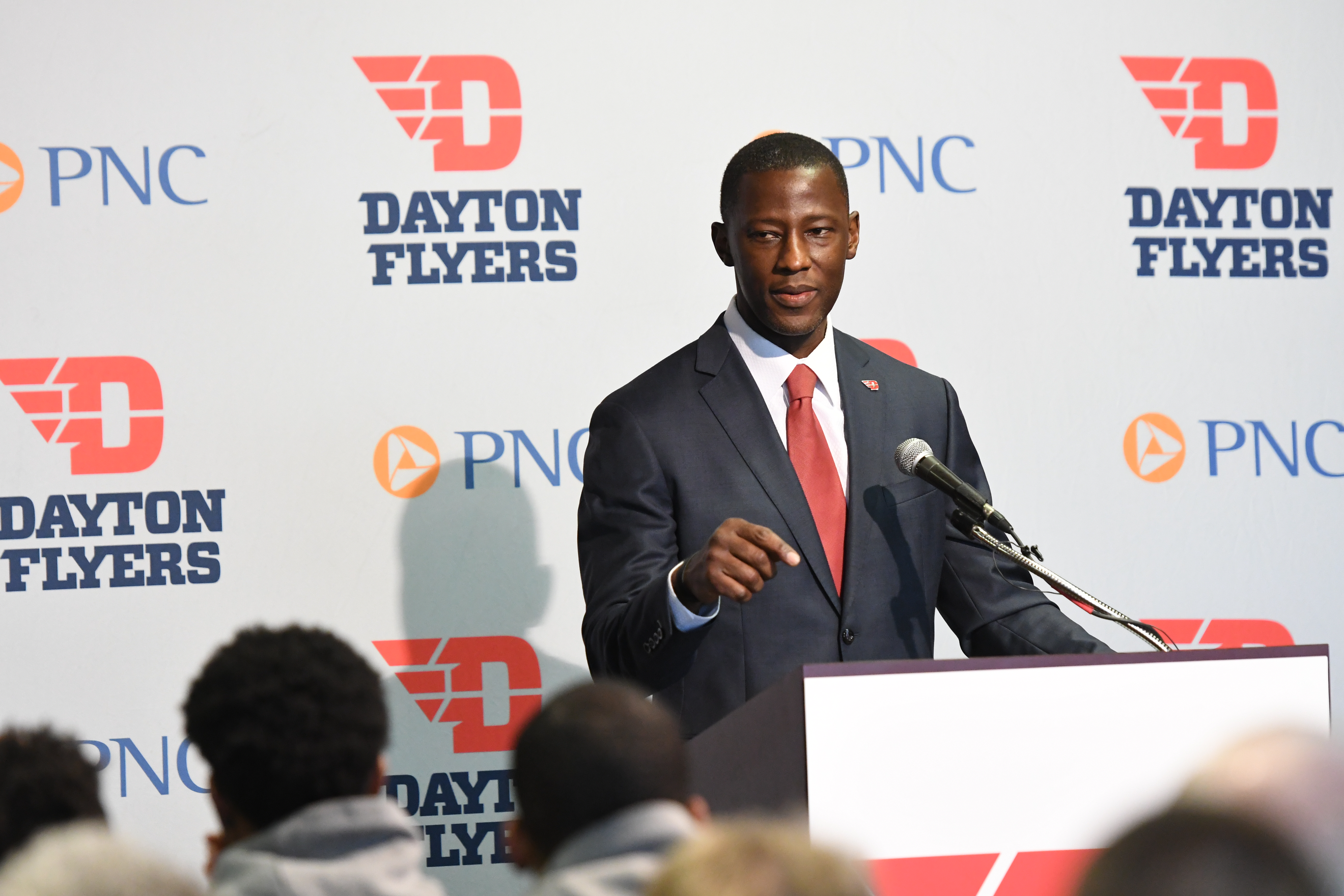
Anthony Grant

Shortly after Miller's departure for Indiana, the school hired Oklahoma City Thunder assistant coach and Dayton alum Anthony Grant as head coach on March 30, 2017. Grant previously served as head coach at VCU and Alabama. Grant began laying the groundwork for the future with his first recruiting class that included future stars Obi Toppin and Jalen Crutcher. His first season at Dayton saw the Flyers finish 14–17 overall, the first time since the 2005–06 season that the team finished with a losing record. His second season featured breakout red-shirt freshman Toppin, who led the team to a third-place finish in the A-10. They lost their first game of the conference tournament, and missed the NCAA tournament for the second straight season. They earned a five seed in the NIT, but lost in the first round at Colorado.

Grant's third season proved to be one of the best in Dayton basketball history. The 2019–20 team began by routing Georgia and Virginia Tech en route to the finals of the 2019 Maui Invitational Tournament where they lost in overtime to Kansas. The Flyers steadily climbed the 2019–2020 AP Poll, finishing the season 29–2, 18–0 in Atlantic 10 Conference play and ranked number three in the nation. Dayton was the only team in the nation not to have lost in regulation during the 2019–20 season and was a projected #1 seed in the East Region in several NCAA tournament bracket projections. However, the COVID-19 pandemic led to the cancellation of the 2020 NCAA tournament on March 12, 2020, prior to completion of the Atlantic 10 tournament and the NCAA opted not to release the Men's and Women's Championship brackets. A post cancellation computer simulation of Jerry Palm's projected field resulted in Dayton winning the championship. Despite the abrupt end, the season yielded numerous highlights for the team and program. Toppin & Crutcher were both named to the Atlantic 10 Conference First Team, while teammates Trey Landers and Ryan Mikesell were named to the Third Team and All-Academic Teams respectively. Toppin was named the Atlantic 10 Player of the Year and Grant was named A-10 Coach of the Year. Toppin was a unanimous selection to the AP All-America First Team, and would receive further recognition, winning the Wooden Award, Naismith Trophy, and being named AP player of the year. Meanwhile, Coach Grant received national coach of the year accolades from Sporting News, as well as winning both the AP coach of the year and Naismith coach of the year award. Finally, ESPN College Gameday made its first ever visit to the Dayton campus on March 7, 2020, highlighting the #3 ranked Flyers and their passionate fan base prior to the final game of the season, a 76–51 victory over George Washington.

The fourth season under Anthony Grant started out promising, led by a trio of Senior Guards in Jalen Crutcher, Ibi Watson, and Rodney Chatman, they picked up two wins against SEC foes in Ole Miss and Mississippi State. Unfortunately injuries, along with PF Chase Johnson leaving the team yet again, led to the team under performing. They did pick up a strong road win against 23rd ranked Saint Louis, giving them a perfect 1–0 record versus AP ranked teams on the season, as well as advancing to the quarterfinals of the 2021 Atlantic 10 tournament. Following the conclusion of the A10 tournament, they earned a bid into the shortened 2021 NIT tournament as a four seed. All games were played at a neutral site in Texas, acting as a "bubble". The team lost in the first round after a close game against #1 seed and eventual champions Memphis.

The Flyers signed their highest rated high school prospect ever in 2020 when DaRon Holmes II agreed to play for the Flyers. Alongside Georgia transfer and future NBA player, Toumani Camara and highly rated freshman point guard Malachi Smith, Holmes' freshman season yielded upsets of Elite Eight bound Miami and eventual National Champion Kansas en route to their second ESPN Events Invitational championship. The 2021-22 team would finish second in the Atlantic 10, but falter in the semi-finals of the conference tournament to Richmond when Malachi Smith suffered an ankle injury. The loss to Richmond and their eventual A-10 tournament championship made Dayton the first team out of the 2022 NCAA tournament. The Flyers would accept an invite to the NIT where they would beat Toledo before falling in overtime on the road to Vanderbilt.

The 2022-23 team began the year with high expectations, ranked #24 in the preseason polls and rising as high as #21. However, an injury plagued trip to the Bahamas for the 2022 Battle 4 Atlantis Tournament resulted in the loss of starting guards Smith and Kobe Elvis, putting the season in jeopardy. Despite this setback, the Flyers regrouped to again finish second in the A-10 regular season, but fell in the conference tournament championship game to VCU, despite a tournament MVP performance by Holmes. Citing injuries, the Flyers declined all post season tournament invites.

Holmes and Camara tested the NBA draft waters following the 2022–23 season. Camara was drafted in the second round by Phoenix, but Holmes withdrew from the draft to return to the Flyers for his junior season. The Flyers were again preseason favorites to win the A-10, but a season ending injury to starting point guard Malachi Smith seven minutes into their first game again threatened to derail the Flyers. Nevertheless, the team reached the championship of the 2023 Charleston Classic and defeated rival Cincinnati heading into conference play. Led by Holmes and Koby Brea, the 2023-2024 NCAA leader in 3-Point Percentage at 50%, the Flyers would enter the AP poll mid-season and remain there through all but one week of the remainder of the season, reaching as high as #16. The Flyers would receive a 7-seed in the West Region of the 2024 NCAA tournament where they would defeat Nevada in dramatic comeback fashion for their first NCAA tournament win since 2015. The Flyers would fall to Arizona in the Round of 32. DaRon Holmes received recognition as the A-10 co-player of the year, and was a consensus Second Team All-American, the second Flyer in five years to receive All-American honors.

Following the conclusion of the 2023-2024 season, Holmes would declare for the NBA draft where he would be selected in the 1st round with the 22nd pick by the Denver Nuggets. Koby Brea would also depart, transferring to the University of Kentucky despite previous comments to the media about his intent to return for the 2024-2025 season.

Following these departures, the 2024-2025 season would follow the path of many other flyer seasons under Anthony Grant. The Flyers would once again start the season off well, defeating 2nd ranked and back-to-back national champions UConn at the Maui invitational. They followed that up by defeating 6th ranked Marquette at UD Arena, leading to their brief appearance in the Top 25 as the 22nd ranked team in the country. The team would however falter in A10 play, picking up critical losses that ultimately left the team on the wrong end of the bubble. After a quarterfinal loss to Saint. Josephs in the A10 tournament, the flyers would receive a 1 seed to a depleted NIT field. After defeating FAU in the first round, the team would be knocked out by Chattanooga.

== Atmosphere ==
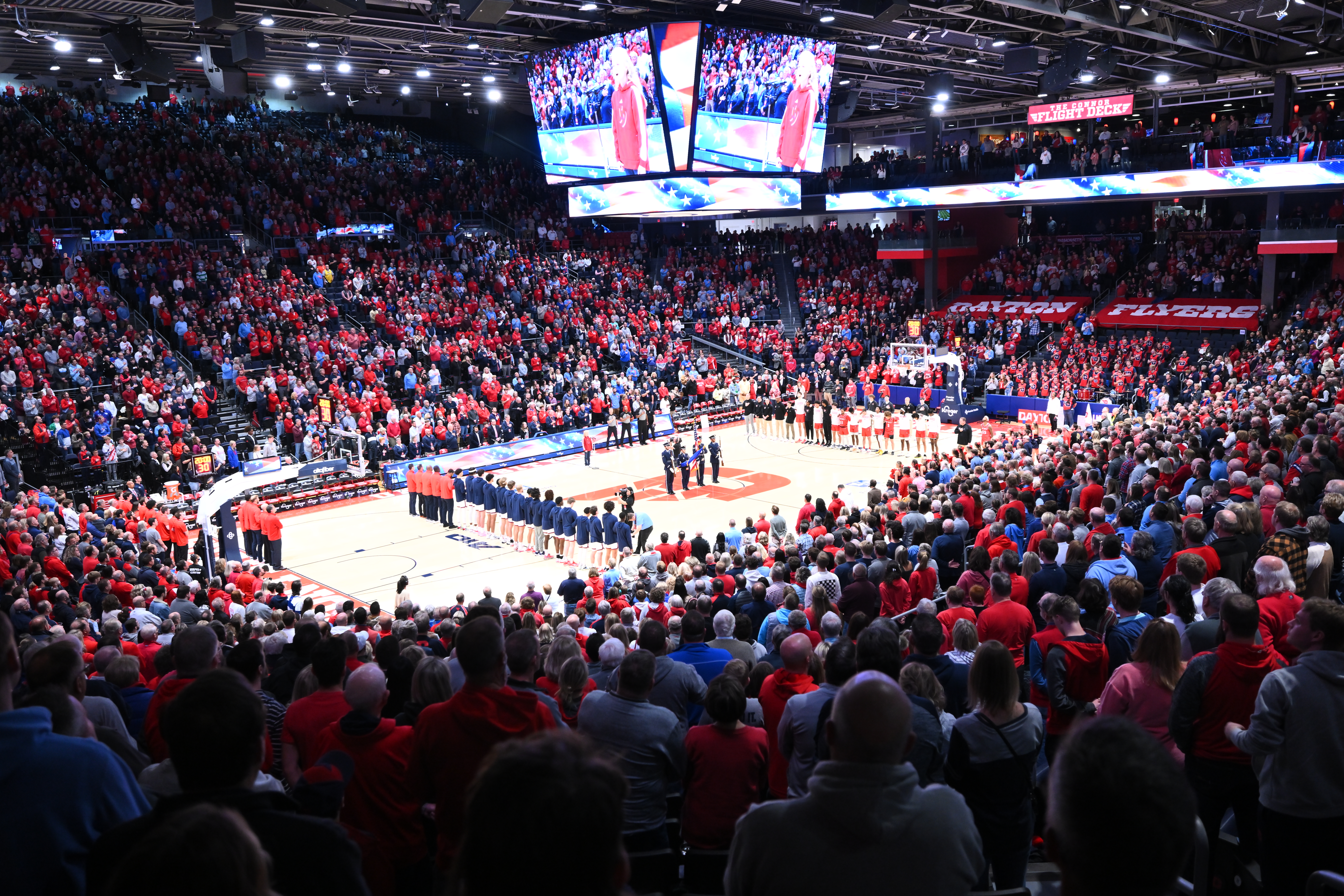
UD Arena in 2023

=== The Flyer Faithful ===
The Flyers are noted for their fan base, dubbed "The Flyer Faithful." The Flyers are routinely in the top-30 in average game attendance among all NCAA Division I basketball programs. As a result of this support, UD Arena is regarded as not only an extremely challenging venue in which to play, but has been hailed as one of the greatest basketball atmospheres in all of college basketball. Additionally, this fan base is noted for its willingness to travel and enthusiastically support the Flyers in both neutral and hostile environments.

=== Rivalries ===
Dayton has historical rivalries with several area teams including Xavier, Miami (Ohio), and Wright State (Gem City Jam), as well as fellow Catholic schools such as Marquette, DePaul, and Notre Dame. Dayton has met Xavier 158 times, more than any other opponent, and holds an 84–75 edge in the series through 2019; however, the Flyers have struggled against Xavier in recent decades, posting a 19–45 record against the Musketeers over the past four decades. Dayton and Xavier played for the Blackburn/McCafferty Trophy.

With the departure of Xavier to the Big East in 2013, Dayton searched for a new Atlantic 10 rivalry game that involved a trophy. Each year Dayton plays Atlantic 10 rival Saint Louis University for the rights to the Arch Baron Cup. The team has developed a similar rivalry with the Virginia Commonwealth University (VCU) Rams since the exit of Xavier from the Atlantic 10 in 2013.

== Postseason ==
=== NCAA tournament results ===
The Flyers have appeared in the NCAA tournament 19 times. Their combined record is 20–21.

Year	Seed	Round	Opponent	Result
1952		Sweet Sixteen; Regional 3rd Place Game	Illinois; Princeton	L 61–80; W 77–61
1965		First Round; Sweet Sixteen; Regional 3rd Place Game	Ohio; Michigan; DePaul	W 66–65; L 71–98; W 75–69
1966		First Round; Sweet Sixteen; Regional 3rd Place Game	Miami (OH); Kentucky; WKU	W 58–51; L 79–86; L 62–82
1967		First Round; Sweet Sixteen; Elite Eight; Final Four; National Championship	WKU; Tennessee; Virginia Tech; North Carolina; UCLA	W 69–67^{OT} W 53–52; W 71–66^{OT} W 76–62; L 64–79
1969		First Round	Colorado State	L 50–52
1970		First Round	Houston	L 64–71
1974		First Round; Sweet Sixteen; Regional 3rd Place Game	Cal State Los Angeles; UCLA; New Mexico	W 88–80; L 100–111^{3OT} L 61–66
1984	#10	First Round; Second Round; Sweet Sixteen; Elite Eight	#7 LSU #2 Oklahoma #6 Washington #1 Georgetown	W 74–66; W 89–85; W 64–58; L 49–61
1985	#9	First Round	#8 Villanova	L 49–51
1990	#12	First Round; Second Round	#5 Illinois #4 Arkansas	W 88–86; L 84–86
2000	#11	First Round	#6 Purdue	L 61–62
2003	#4	First Round	#13 Tulsa	L 71–84
2004	#10	First Round	#7 DePaul	L 69–76
2009	#11	First Round; Second Round	#6 West Virginia #3 Kansas	W 68–60; L 43–60
2014	#11	First Round; Second Round; Sweet Sixteen; Elite Eight	#6 Ohio State #3 Syracuse #10 Stanford #1 Florida	W 60–59; W 55–53; W 82–72; L 52–62
2015	#11	First Four; First round Second Round	#11 Boise State #6 Providence #3 Oklahoma	W 56–55; W 66–53; L 66–72
2016	#7	First Round	#10 Syracuse	L 51–70
2017	#7	First Round	#10 Wichita State	L 58–64
2024	#7	First Round; Second Round	#10 Nevada #2 Arizona	W 63–60; L 68–78

==== NCAA tournament seeding history ====
The NCAA began seeding the tournament with the 1979 edition.

Years →	'84	'85	'90	'00	'03	'04	'09	'14	'15	'16	'17	'24
Seeds	10	9	12	11	4	10	11	11	11	7	7	7

=== NIT results ===
The Flyers have appeared in the National Invitation Tournament (NIT) 28 times. Their combined record is 42–26. They are three time NIT champions (1962, 1968, 2010). The Flyers also turned down a 2023 NIT invitation due to health and safety concerns.

Year	Round	Opponent	Result
1951	First Round; Quarterfinals; Semifinals; Finals	Lawrence Tech; Arizona; St. John's; BYU	W 77–71; W 74–68; W 69–62; L 43–62
1952	First Round; Quarterfinals; Semifinals; Finals	NYU; Saint Louis; St. Bonaventure; La Salle	W 81–66; W 68–58; W 69–62; L 64–75
1954	First Round; Quarterfinals	Manhattan; Niagara	W 90–79; L 74–77
1955	Quarterfinals; Semifinals; Finals	Saint Louis; Saint Francis (PA); Duquesne	W 97–81; W 79–73; L 58–70
1956	Quarterfinals; Semifinals; Finals	Xavier; St. Francis (NY); Louisville	W 72–68; W 89–58; L 80–93
1957	First Round; Quarterfinals	Saint Peter's; Temple	W 79–71; L 66–77
1958	Quarterfinals; Semifinals; Finals	Fordham; St. John's; Xavier	W 74–70; W 80–56; L 74–78
1960	First Round; Quarterfinals	Temple; Bradley	W 72–51; L 64–78
1961	Quarterfinals; Semifinals; 3rd Place Game	Temple; Saint Louis; Holy Cross	W 62–60; L 60–67; L 67–85
1962	First Round; Quarterfinals; Semifinals; Finals	Wichita State; Houston; Loyola–Chicago; St. John's	W 79–71; W 94–77; W 98–82; W 73–67
1968	First Round; Quarterfinals; Semifinals; Finals	West Virginia; Fordham; Notre Dame; Kansas	W 87–68; W 61–60; W 76–74; W 61–48
1971	First Round	Duke	L 60–68
1978	First Round; Quarterfinals	Fairfield; Georgetown	W 108–93; L 62–71
1979	First Round; Second Round	Holy Cross; Purdue	W 105–81; L 70–84
1981	First Round; Second Round	Fordham; Purdue	W 66–65; L 46–50
1982	First Round; Second Round; Quarterfinals	Connecticut; Illinois; Oklahoma	W 76–75; W 61–58; L 82–91
1986	First Round	McNeese State	L 75–86
1998	First Round; Second Round	Long Island; Penn State	W 95–92; L 74–77
2001	First Round; Second Round; Quarterfinals	UNC Wilmington; Richmond; Detroit	W 68–59; W 71–56; L 42–59
2002	Opening Round; First Round	Detroit; Tennessee Tech	W 80–69; L 59–68
2008	First Round; Second Round; Quarterfinals	Cleveland State; Illinois State; Ohio State	W 66–57; W 55–48; L 63–74
2010	First Round; Second Round; Quarterfinals; Semifinals; Finals	Illinois State; Cincinnati; Illinois; Ole Miss; North Carolina	W 63–42; W 81–66; W 77–71; W 68–63; W 79–68
2011	First Round	College of Charleston	L 84–94
2012	First Round	Iowa	L 72–84
2019	First Round	Colorado	L 73–78
2021	First Round	Memphis	L 60–71
2022	First Round; Second Round	Toledo; Vanderbilt	W 74–55; L 68–70^{OT}
2025	First Round; Second Round	Florida Atlantic; Chattanooga	W 86–79; L 72–87

== Awards and Statistics ==
=== All-time statistic leaders ===
==== 1,000-point scorers ====
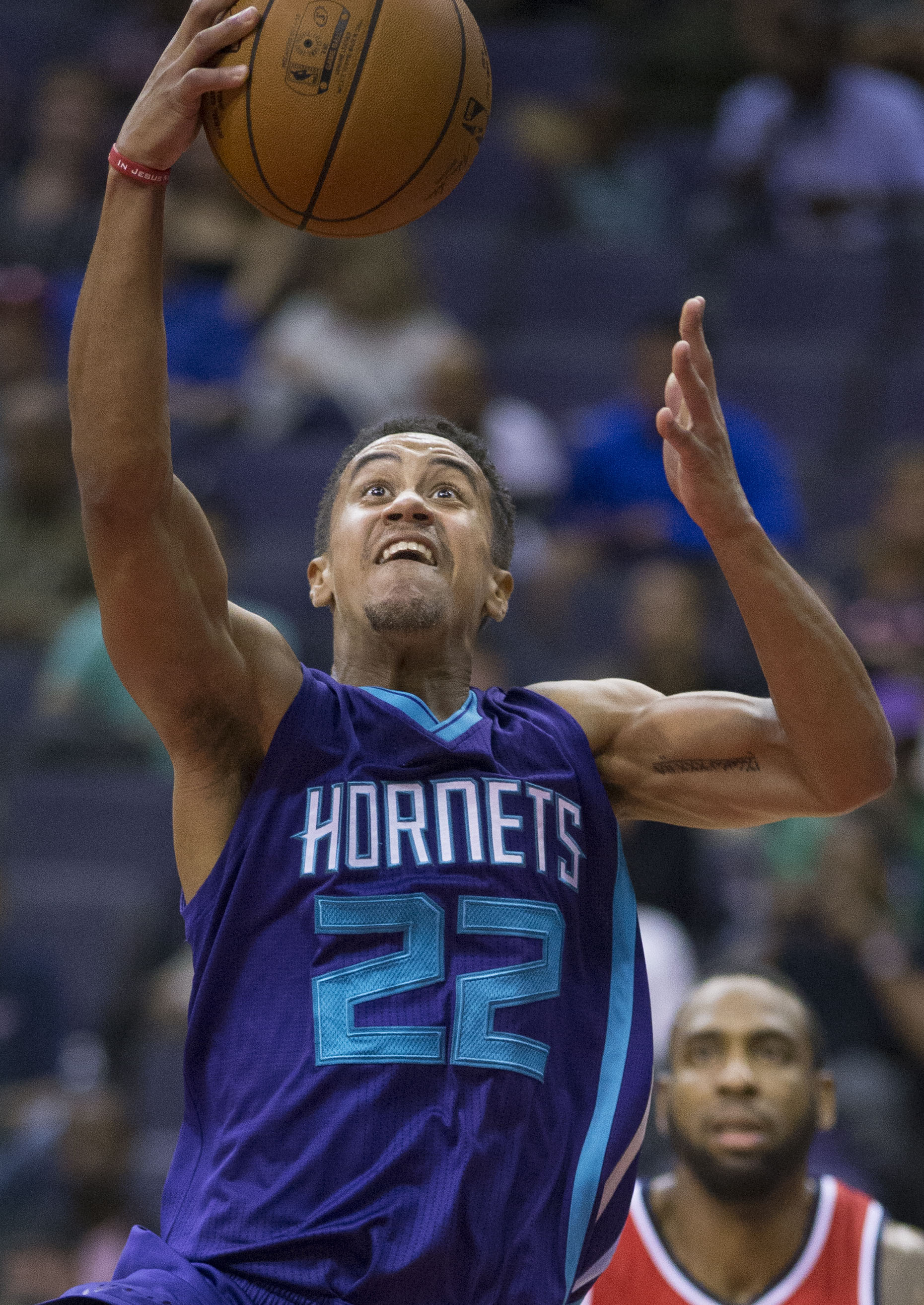
Brian Roberts, 2004–2008

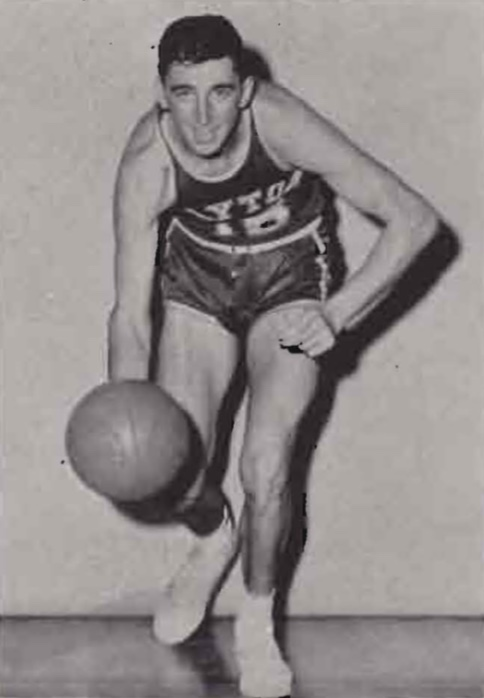
John Horan, 1951–1955

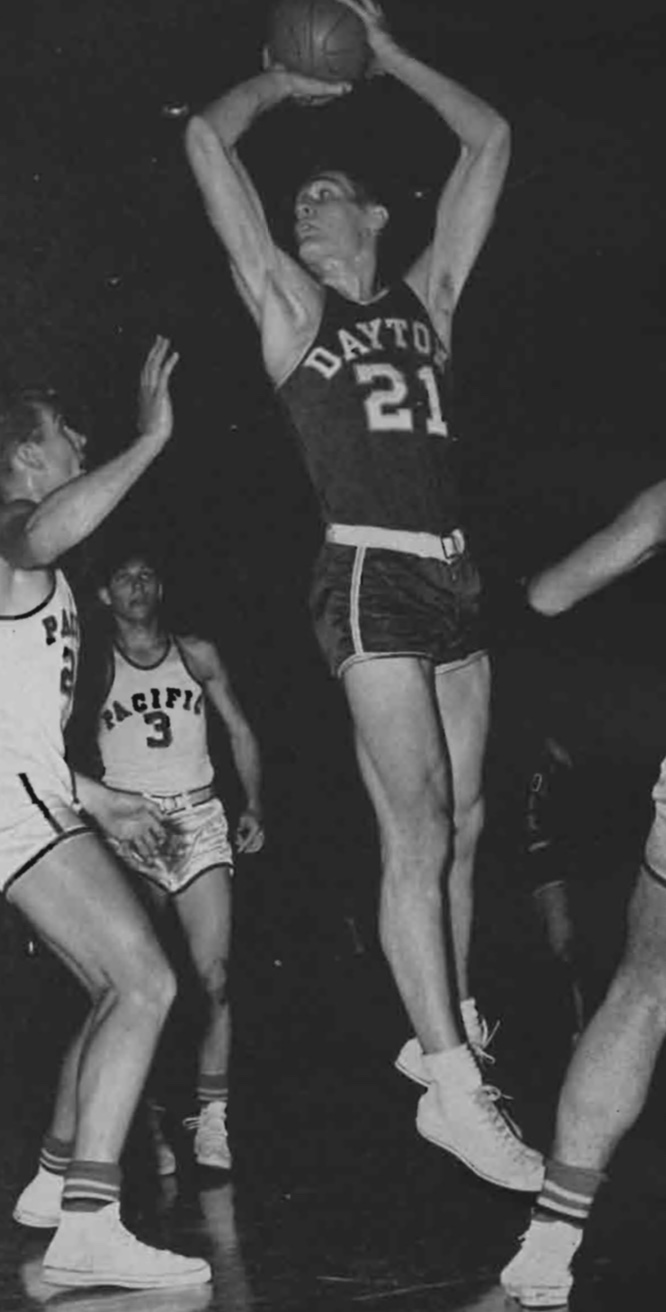
Bill Uhl, 1953–1956

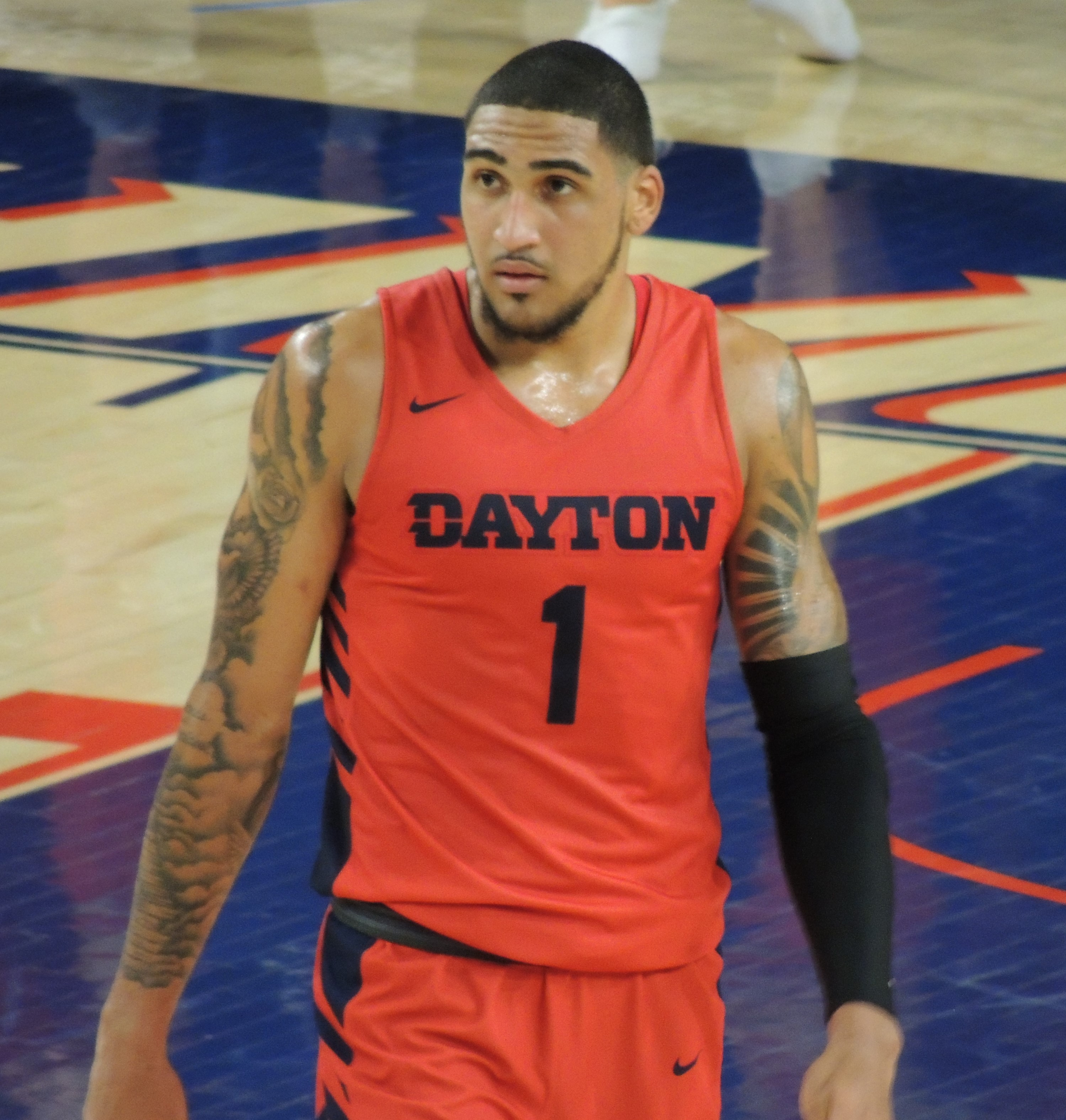
Obi Toppin, 2018–2020

The Flyers currently have been 52 players who have scored 1,000 points as a Flyer. Additionally, they have Five other players who have transferred to UD and scored their 1,000th point in a Flyer uniform.

Roosevelt Chapman is the all-time leading scorer at UD with 2,233 points. Hank Finkel owns the highest scoring average at 23.7 points per game

Rank	Player name	Points	Games	PPG	Seasons played
1	Roosevelt Chapman	2,233	118	18.9	1981–84
2	Don May	1,980	90	22.0	1965–68
3	Henry Finkel	1,968	83	23.7	1963–66
4	Brian Roberts	1,962	125	15.7	2004–08
5	Jim Paxson	1,945	108	18.0	1975–79
6	Don Meineke	1,866	96	19.4	1949–52
7	Tony Stanley	1,835	125	14.7	1997–01
8	Negele Knight	1,806	122	14.8	1985–90
9	Anthony Corbitt	1,760	120	14.7	1986–90
10	John Horan	1,757	120	14.6	1951–55
11	DaRon Holmes II	1,745	102	17.1	2021–24
12	Donald Smith	1,655	81	20.4	1971–74
13	Mike Kanieski	1,642	115	14.3	1978–82
14	Bill Uhl	1,627	88	18.5	1953–56
15	Jack Sallee	1,610	122	13.2	1951–55
16	Chris Wright	1,601	123	13.0	2007–11
17	Jalen Crutcher	1,593	118	13.5	2017–21
18	Johnny Davis	1,562	81	19.3	1973–76
19	Ramod Marshall	1,538	127	12.1	2000–04
20	Ryan Perryman	1,524	116	13.1	1994–98
21	Keith Waleskowski	1,515	129	11.7	2000–04
22	Jack Zimmerman	1,482	111	13.4	1976–80
23	Chris Johnson	1,467	138	10.6	2008–12
24	Mark Ashman	1,449	119	12.2	1996–00
25	Brooks Hall	1,404	123	11.0	1999–03
26	Garry Roggenburk	1,398	87	11.8	1959–62
27	Chip Hare	1,323	112	11.8	1991–95
28	Dyshawn Pierre	1,317	118	11.2	2012–16
29	Marcus Johnson	1,286	135	9.5	2006–10
30	Scoochie Smith	1,273	132	9.6	2013–17
31	Ed Young	1,253	107	11.7	1982–87
32	Mike Sylvester	1,248	81	15.4	1971–74
33	Javon Bennett	1,238	102	12.1 (Note: Javon Bennett played for Merrimack from 2022–23 where he scored 327 points. His total points scored over his career is 1,451 for a per game average of 11.5.)	2023-26
34	Erv Giddings	1,227	102	12.0	1974–78
35	Alex Robertson	1,212	117	10.4	1990–94
36	Ken May	1,207	80	15.1	1968–71
37	Damon Goodwin	1,191	119	10.0	1982–86
38	Frank Case	1,175	83	14.2	1957–60
39	Kendall Pollard	1,149	119	9.7	2013–17
40	Chuck Grigsby	1,105	96	11.5	1949–52
41	Gordy Hatton	1,097	80	13.7	1961–64
42	Obi Toppin	1,096	64	17.1	2018–20
43	Richard Montague	1,093	112	9.8	1977–81
44	Derrick Dukes	1,061	116	9.1	1990–94
45	Bobby Joe Hooper	1,059	87	12.2	1965–68
46	Monty Scott	1,054	111	9.5	2003–07
47	Dave Colbert	1,049	59	17.8 (Note: Dave Colbert played for Cleveland State from 1981–83 where he scored 718 points. His total points scored over his career is 1,767 for a per game average of 15.5.)	1984–86
48	Jordan Sibert	1,030	73	14.1 (Note: Jordan Sibert played for Ohio State from 2010–12 where he scored 123 points. His total points scored over his career is 1,153 for a per game average of 9.5.)	2013–15
49	Coby Turner	1,025	114	9.0	1995–99
50	Junior Norris	1,009	95	10.6	1949–52
51	Darrell Davis	1,008	130	7.8	2014–18
52	Sean Finn	1,003	123	8.1	2000–04

==== Rebounds ====
Rank	Player	Years	Games	Reb. Avg.	Total Rebounds
1	John Horan	1951–55	120	11.2	1341
2	Don May	1965–68	90	14.5	1301
3	Bill Uhl	1953–56	99	14.6	1299
4	Ryan Perryman	1994–98	116	10.0	1156
5	Henry Finkel	1963–66	83	13.3	1106
6	Keith Waleskowski	2000–04	129	8.5	1092
7	Garry Roggenburk	1959–62	87	11.8	1027
8	Roosevelt Chapman	1980–84	118	8.1	956
9	Erv Giddings	1974–78	102	9.2	935
10	Chris Wright	2007–11	123	7.2	887

==== Assists ====
Rank	Player	Years	Games	Ast. Avg.	Total Assists
1	Negele Knight	1985–90	122	5.43	663
2	Jalen Crutcher	2017–2021	118	4.95	584
3	David Morris	1998–2002	125	4.50	562
4	Jack Zimmerman	1976–80	111	4.97	552
5	Jim Paxson	1975–79	108	4.77	515
6	Kevin Conrad	1979–83	106	4.70	498
T-7	Derrick Dukes	1990–94	116	4.28	497
T-7	Ramod Marshall	2000–04	127	3.91	497
9	Scoochie Smith	2013–17	132	3.67	485
10	Larry Schellenberg	1981–85	112	4.15	465

==== Blocks ====
Rank	Player	Years	Games	Block Avg.	Total Blocks
1	DaRon Holmes II	2021–2024	102	2.11	215
2	Chris Wright	2007–11	123	1.32	162
3	Sean Finn	2000–04	123	1.13	139
4	Roosevelt Chapman	1980–84	118	1.05	124
5	Erv Giddings	1974–78	102	1.14	116
6	Mark Ashman	1996–2000	119	0.81	96
7	Anthony Corbitt	1986–90	120	0.68	82
8	Ed Young	1982–87	107	0.72	78
9	Wes Coffee	1988–92	108	0.71	77
10	Kendall Pollard	2013–17	124	0.58	72

==== Steals ====
Rank	Player	Years	Games	Steals Avg.	Total Steals
1	Alex Robertson	1989–94	117	2.36	276
2	London Warren	2006–10	137	1.28	175
3	Tony Stanley	1997–2001	125	1.39	174
4	Scoochie Smith	2013–17	138	1.25	172
5	Jim Paxson	1975–79	108	1.56	168
6	Derrick Dukes	1990–94	116	1.43	166
7	Negele Knight	1985–90	122	1.33	162
8	Kyle Davis	2013–17	134	1.19	160
9	Roosevelt Chapman	1980–84	118	1.35	159
10	David Morris	1998–2002	125	1.24	155

==== Three-pointers made ====
Rank	Player	Years	3PT	Att.	PCT
1	Brian Roberts	2004–08	293	665	.441
2	Tony Stanley	1997–01	291	813	.358
3	Brooks Hall	1999–03	285	731	.390
4	Jalen Crutcher	2017–21	242	646	.375
5	Ramod Marshall	2000–04	241	669	.360
6	Christapher Johnson	2008–12	236	636	.371
7	Koby Brea	2020–24	224	516	.434
8	Norm Grevey	1986–91	208	481	.432
9	Javon Bennett	2023-26	203	574	.354
10	Darrell Davis	2014–18	191	507	.377

=== Award winners ===
==== National Player of the Year ====
Player	Year(s)	Award(s)
Obi Toppin	2020	John R. Wooden Award; Naismith; Associated Press; Oscar Robertson Trophy; NABC

==== All-Americans ====
Player	Year(s)	Team(s)
Alphonse Schumacher	1912	Helms
Alphonse Schumacher	1913	Helms
Don Meineke	1952	Consensus Second Team – AP (3rd), UPI (3rd), Look (2nd), INS (2nd)
Johnny Horan	1955	UPI (3rd)
Bill Uhl	1956	Consensus Second Team – AP (2nd), UPI (2nd), Look (1st), NEA (2nd), INS (2nd), Collier's (2nd)
Hank Finkel	1966	AP (3rd), UPI (3rd), NABC (3rd)
Don May	1967	Consensus Second Team – USBWA (1st), UPI (2nd)
Don May	1968	Consensus Second Team – AP (2nd), NABC (2nd), UPI (2nd)
Jim Paxson	1979	Consensus Second Team – USBWA (2nd), NABC (2nd), UPI (2nd)
Obi Toppin	2020	Consensus First Team – AP (1st), USBWA (1st), NABC (1st), Sporting News (1st)
DaRon Holmes II	2024	Consensus Second Team – AP (2nd), USBWA (3rd), NABC (2nd), Sporting News (2nd)

=== Flyers in the NBA/ABA ===
- Kostas Antetokounmpo (2017–2018) – 2018–2021 (Dallas Mavericks, Los Angeles Lakers)
- Arlen Bockhorn (1955–1958) – 1958–1965 (Cincinnati Royals)
- Koby Brea (2020-2024) - 2025–present (Phoenix Suns)
- Roger Brown (1960–1961) – 1967–1975 (Indiana Pacers)
- Toumani Camara (2021–2023) – 2023–present (Portland Trail Blazers)
- Charles Cooke (2015–2017) – 2017–2018 (New Orleans Pelicans)
- Jalen Crutcher (2017–2021) – 2024 (New Orleans Pelicans)
- Johnny Davis (1973–1976) – 1976–1986 (Portland Trail Blazers, Indiana Pacers, Atlanta Hawks, Cleveland Cavaliers)
- Hank Finkel (1963–1966) – 1966–1975 (Los Angeles Lakers, San Diego Rockets, Boston Celtics)
- Chuck Grigsby (1948–1952) – 1954–1955 (New York Knicks)
- Chris Harris (1951–1955) – (St. Louis Hawks, Rochester Royals)
- DaRon Holmes II (2021–2024) – (Denver Nuggets)
- Bobby Joe Hooper (1964–1967) – 1968–1969 (Indiana Pacers)
- Johnny Horan (1951–1955) – 1955–1956 (Minneapolis Lakers)
- Chris Johnson (2008–2012) – 2012–2016 (Memphis Grizzlies, Boston Celtics, Philadelphia 76ers, Milwaukee Bucks, Utah Jazz, Israel Basketball Premier League)
- Negele Knight (1985–1990) – 1990–1999 (Phoenix Suns, San Antonio Spurs, Detroit Pistons, Toronto Raptors), Israeli Basketball Premier League
- Don May (1965–1968) – 1968–1975 (New York Knicks, Buffalo Braves, Atlanta Hawks, Philadelphia 76ers, Kansas City Kings)
- Don "Monk" Meineke (1949–1952) – (Fort Wayne Pistons, Rochester Royals, Cincinnati Royals)
- Jim Palmer (1954–1957) – 1958–1961 (Cincinnati Royals, New York Knicks)
- Jim Paxson Jr. (1975–1979) – 1979–1990 (Portland Trail Blazers, Boston Celtics)
- Jim Paxson Sr. (1951–1956) – 1956–1958 (Minneapolis Lakers, Cincinnati Royals)
- Brian Roberts (2004–2008) – 2012–2017 (New Orleans Pelicans, Charlotte Hornets, Portland Trail Blazers)
- Jordan Sibert (2013–2015) – 2019 (Atlanta Hawks)
- Don Smith (1971–1974) – 1974–1975 (Philadelphia 76ers)
- Sedric Toney (1983–1985) – 1985–1990 (Atlanta Hawks, Phoenix Suns, New York Knicks, Indiana Pacers, Sacramento Kings, Cleveland Cavaliers)
- Obi Toppin (2018–2020) – 2020–present (New York Knicks, Indiana Pacers)
- Chris Wright (2007–2011) – 2011–2014 (Golden State Warriors, Milwaukee Bucks)

=== Mid-Season Tournament Championships ===
Year	Tournament	Tournament Record
1973	UD Invitational Tournament	2-0
1977	UD Invitational Tournament	2-0
1978	UD Invitational Tournament	2-0
1980	UD Invitational Tournament	2-0
1981	UD Invitational Tournament	2-0
1982	UD Invitational Tournament	2-0
1983	Meryll Lynch Classic	2-0
1984	Meryll Lynch Classic	2-0
1985	Meryll Lynch Classic	2-0
1999	CoSIDA Classic	2-0
2003	Maui Invitational	3-0
2008	Chicago Invitational Challenge	4-0
2011	Old Spice Classic	3-0
2021	ESPN Events Invitational	3-0

== Business value ==
According to a Wall Street Journal report—annual college basketball value ranking reports, University of Dayton's basketball team are ranked in the top 20 (18th) in the US with $100,010,000 value based on the financial data of 2017.
