= Chris Wright (basketball, born 1988) =

American basketball player (born 1988)

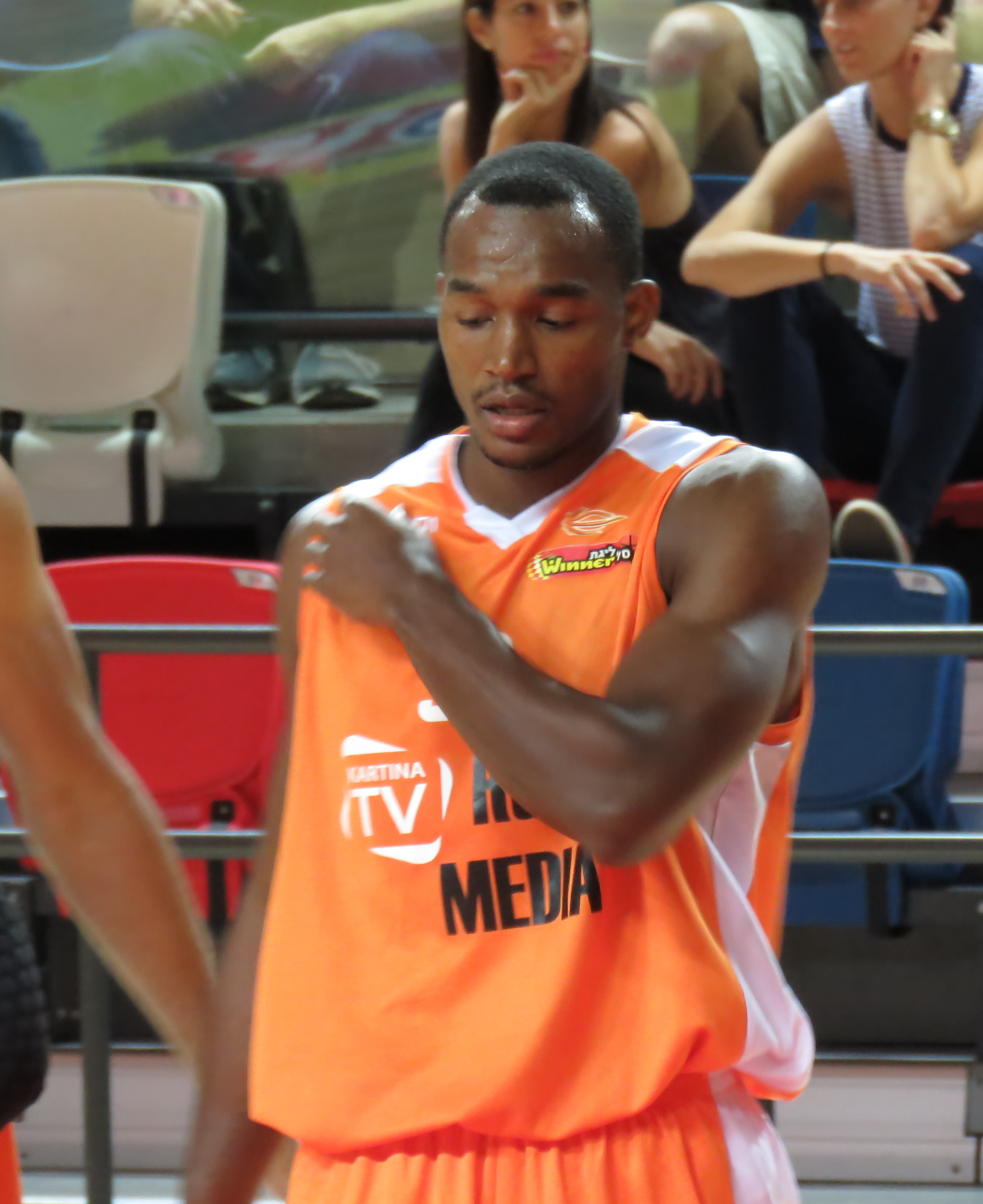
- Wright with Maccabi Rishon LeZion in 2015

Personal information
- Born: September 30, 1988 (age 37) Trotwood, Ohio, U.S.
- Listed height: 6 ft 8 in (2.03 m)
- Listed weight: 226 lb (103 kg)

Career information
- High school: Trotwood-Madison (Trotwood, Ohio)
- College: Dayton (2007–2011)
- NBA draft: 2011: undrafted
- Playing career: 2011–2019
- Position: Power forward
- Number: 33, 15

Career history
- 2011: Maine Red Claws
- 2011–2012: Golden State Warriors
- 2012: →Dakota Wizards
- 2012–2014: Maine Red Claws
- 2014: Milwaukee Bucks
- 2014–2015: Turów Zgorzelec
- 2015–2016: Maccabi Rishon LeZion
- 2017–2019: Oklahoma City Blue

Career highlights
- Israeli League champion (2016); All-NBA D-League Second Team (2014); NBA D-League All-Defensive Second Team (2014); 2× NBA D-League All-Star (2013–2014); All-NBA D-League Third Team (2013); NBA D-League All-Defensive First Team (2013); NIT champion (2010); First-team All-Atlantic 10 (2010); Second-team All-Atlantic 10 (2009); Third-team All-Atlantic 10 (2011); Atlantic 10 All-Freshman Team (2008)
- Stats at NBA.com
- Stats at Basketball Reference

Chris Wright (born September 30, 1988) is an American former professional basketball player. He played college basketball for the University of Dayton. Wright played in the National Basketball Association (NBA) for the Golden State Warriors and Milwaukee Bucks.

== High school and college career ==
Wright attended Trotwood-Madison High School and, after graduating, he attended the University of Dayton from 2007 to 2011. While at Dayton, Wright was considered the "greatest above-the-rim player" in Flyers history upon graduating in May 2011. He holds school records for dunks and blocked shots in a career and was named to the all-Atlantic 10 team three times in his career, a first for a Dayton Flyer.

== Professional career ==
=== 2011–12 season ===
Wright went undrafted in the 2011 NBA draft and subsequently chose not to play outside of the United States during the 2011 NBA lockout. On November 3, 2011, he was selected with the 3rd overall pick by the Maine Red Claws in the 2011 NBA Development League Draft. He appeared in four games with the Red Claws, averaging 17 points, 10.8 rebounds and 1.5 blocks in 31.3 minutes.

On December 10, 2011, Wright signed with the Golden State Warriors. On April 26, 2012, Wright made his first and only start of the season in the last game of the season. In 46 minutes of action, he recorded 25 points, 8 rebounds, 2 blocks and 1 steal in a 101–107 loss to the San Antonio Spurs. During his rookie season, Wright was assigned to the Dakota Wizards of the NBA D-League three times.

=== 2012–13 season ===
In July 2012, Wright joined the Golden State Warriors and the Toronto Raptors for the 2012 Las Vegas Summer League. On September 21, 2012, Wright signed with the Raptors. However, he was later waived by the Raptors on October 22, 2012.

On November 1, 2012, Wright was re-acquired by the Maine Red Claws. On February 4, 2013, Wright was named to the Futures All-Star roster for the 2013 NBA D-League All-Star Game.

=== 2013–14 season ===
In July 2013, Wright joined the Indiana Pacers for the Orlando Summer League and the Toronto Raptors for the Las Vegas Summer League.

On September 19, 2013, Wright signed with the Toronto Raptors. However, he was later waived by the Raptors on October 26, 2013. On October 31, 2013, he was re-acquired by the Maine Red Claws. On February 3, 2014, Wright was named to the Futures All-Star roster for the 2014 NBA D-League All-Star Game.

On March 14, 2014, Wright signed a 10-day contract with the Milwaukee Bucks. On March 24, 2014, he was not offered a second 10-day contract after his first 10-day contract expired. The next day, he was re-acquired by the Red Claws. On April 5, 2014, he signed another 10-day contract with the Bucks. On April 15, 2014, he signed a multi-year deal with the Bucks.

=== 2014–15 season ===
In July 2014, Wright joined the Milwaukee Bucks for the 2014 NBA Summer League. On October 16, 2014, he was waived by the Bucks. On October 26, 2014, he signed with Turów Zgorzelec of Poland for the 2014–15 season.

=== 2015–16 season ===
On August 8, 2015, Wright signed with Maccabi Rishon LeZion of the Israeli Basketball Premier League. He helped Maccabi Rishon LeZion win their first ever Israeli League championship during the 2015–16 season.

=== 2016–17 season ===
On September 23, 2016, Wright signed with the Oklahoma City Thunder. However, he was later waived by the Thunder on October 24 after appearing in one preseason game. On November 3, he was acquired by the Oklahoma City Blue of the NBA Development League.

=== 2017–18 season ===
On October 11, 2017, Wright signed a training camp contract with the Oklahoma City Thunder. He was waived on October 14 as one of the team's final preseason roster cuts and nine days later, he re-signed with the Oklahoma City Blue. On March 23, 2018, he was waived by the Blue after a season-ending injury. He played 16 games that season.

=== 2018–19 season ===
Wright was added to the Oklahoma City Blue training camp roster on October 23, 2018.

== Career statistics ==
Legend
GP	Games played	GS	Games started	MPG	Minutes per game
FG%	Field-goal percentage	3P%	3-point field-goal percentage	FT%	Free-throw percentage
RPG	Rebounds per game	APG	Assists per game	SPG	Steals per game
BPG	Blocks per game	PPG	Points per game	PIR	Performance index rating
**Bold**	Career high

=== NBA ===
==== Regular season ====
Year	Team	GP	GS	MPG	FG%	3P%	FT%	RPG	APG	SPG	BPG	PPG
2011–12	Golden State	**24**	**1**	7.8	.511	.000	**.774**	1.9	.2	.3	.5	2.9
2013–14	Milwaukee	8	0	**15.8**	**.600**	.000	.400	**2.5**	**.6**	**.9**	**.6**	**6.0**
Career		32	1	9.7	.550	.000	.652	2.0	.3	.4	.6	3.7
