= Dayton Flyers men's basketball statistical leaders =

The Dayton Flyers basketball statistical leaders are individual statistical leaders of the Dayton Flyers basketball program in various categories, including points, rebounds, assists, steals, and blocks. Within those areas, the lists identify single-game, single-season, and career leaders. The Flyers represent the University of Dayton in the NCAA's Atlantic 10 Conference.

Dayton began competing in intercollegiate basketball in 1903. However, the school's record book does not generally list records from before the 1950s, as records from before this period are often incomplete and inconsistent. Since scoring was much lower in this era, and teams played much fewer games during a typical season, it is likely that few or no players from this era would appear on these lists anyway.

The NCAA did not officially record assists as a stat until the 1983–84 season, and blocks and steals until the 1985–86 season, but Dayton's record books includes players in these stats before these seasons. These lists are updated through the end of the 2025-26 season.

== Scoring ==
Career
Rk	Player	Points	Seasons
1	Roosevelt Chapman	2233	1980–81 1981–82 1982–83 1983–84
2	Don May	1980	1965–66 1966–67 1967–68
3	Henry Finkel	1968	1963–64 1964–65 1965–66
4	Brian Roberts	1962	2004–05 2005–06 2006–07 2007–08
5	Jim Paxson	1945	1975–76 1976–77 1977–78 1978–79
6	Don Meineke	1866	1949–50 1950–51 1951–52
7	Tony Stanley	1835	1997–98 1998–99 1999–00 2000–01
8	Negele Knight	1806	1985–86 1987–88 1988–89 1989–90
9	Anthony Corbitt	1760	1986–87 1987–88 1988–89 1989–90
10	John Horan	1757	1951–52 1952–53 1953–54 1954–55

Season
Rk	Player	Points	Season
1	Henry Finkel	733	1964–65
2	Negele Knight	731	1989–90
3	Don May	701	1967–68
4	Roosevelt Chapman	699	1983–84
5	Don Meineke	696	1951–52
6	Don May	689	1966–67
7	DaRon Holmes II	672	2023–24
8	Don Meineke	660	1950–51
9	Henry Finkel	659	1965–66
10	Brian Roberts	627	2007–08

Single game
Rk	Player	Points	Season	Opponent
1	Donald Smith	52	1972–73	Loyola/Ill.
2	Don Meineke	49	1950–51	Muskingum
3	Don May	45	1965–66	Xavier
4	Donald Smith	44	1972–73	Xavier
	Henry Finkel	44	1965–66	Maryland
6	Negele Knight	42	1989–90	Detroit
7	Roosevelt Chapman	41	1983–84	Oklahoma/NCAA
	Tom Crosswhite	41	1970–71	Loyola/La.
9	Chuck Grigsby	40	1951–52	Southern Miss
10	Don Meineke	39	1951–52	Ohio U.

== Rebounds ==
Career
Rk	Player	Rebounds	Seasons
1	John Horan	1341	1951–52 1952–53 1953–54 1954–55
2	Don May	1301	1965–66 1966–67 1967–68
3	Bill Uhl	1289	1953–54 1954–55 1955–56
4	Ryan Perryman	1156	1994–95 1995–96 1996–97 1997–98
5	Henry Finkel	1106	1963–64 1964–65 1965–66
6	Keith Waleskowski	1092	2000–01 2001–02 2002–03 2003–04
7	Garry Roggenburk	1027	1959–60 1960–61 1961–62
8	Roosevelt Chapman	956	1980–81 1981–82 1982–83 1983–84
9	Erv Giddings	935	1974–75 1975–76 1976–77 1977–78
10	Chris Wright	887	2007–08 2008–09 2009–10 2010–11

Season
Rk	Player	Rebounds	Season
1	Don May	519	1966–67
2	Bill Uhl	491	1953–54
3	Don May	451	1967–68
4	John Horan	433	1953–54
5	Henry Finkel	431	1964–65
6	Ryan Perryman	412	1997–98
7	Bill Uhl	400	1954–55
8	Bill Uhl	398	1955–56
9	George Jackson	391	1969–70
	George Jackson	391	1970–71

Single game
Rk	Player	Rebounds	Season	Opponent
1	Garry Roggenburk	32	1959–60	Miami (Oh.)
2	Al Sicking	30	1956–57	E. Kentucky
3	Don May	28	1967–68	St. Louis
	Don May	28	1967–68	N. Michigan
	Henry Finkel	28	1964–65	Chattanooga
6	Don May	27	1966–67	St. Louis
7	Don May	26	1966–67	Tampa
	Henry Finkel	26	1963–64	Memphis
	Bill Uhl	26	1955–56	Iona

== Assists ==
Career
Rk	Player	Assists	Seasons
1	Negele Knight	663	1985–86 1987–88 1988–89 1989–90
2	Jalen Crutcher	584	2017–18 2018–19 2019–20 2020–21
3	David Morris	562	1998–99 1999–00 2000–01 2001–02
4	Jack Zimmerman	552	1976–77 1977–78 1978–79 1979–80
5	Jim Paxson	515	1975–76 1976–77 1977–78 1978–79
6	Kevin Conrad	498	1979–80 1980–81 1981–82 1982–83
7	Derrick Dukes	497	1990–91 1991–92 1992–93 1993–94
	Ramod Marshall	497	2000–01 2001–02 2002–03 2003–04
9	Scoochie Smith	485	2013–14 2014–15 2015–16 2016–17
10	Larry Schellenberg	465	1981–82 1982–83 1983–84 1984–85

Season
Rk	Player	Assists	Season
1	Negele Knight	216	1989–90
2	Kevin Dillard	198	2011–12
3	David Morris	192	2001–02
4	Juwan Staten	190	2010–11
5	Jalen Crutcher	187	2018–19
6	Kevin Conrad	179	1980–81
7	Malachi Smith	175	2021-22
8	David Morris	174	2000–01
	Malachi Smith	174	2024–25
10	Negele Knight	168	1988–89

Single game
Rk	Player	Assists	Season	Opponent
1	Negele Knight	15	1989–90	Xavier
2	Ray Springer	14	1988–89	Xavier
	Kevin Conrad	14	1982–83	Otterbein
	Kevin Conrad	14	1980–81	Xavier
	Kevin Conrad	14	1980–81	Alcorn State
6	Derrick Dukes	13	1990–91	Southern
	Larry Schellenberg	13	1984–85	Cincinnati
	Jim Paxson	13	1978–79	Cal Poly Pomona
	Kevin Dillard	13	2011–12	Rhode Island
	Malachi Smith	13	2022–23	Richmond

== Steals ==
Career
Rk	Player	Steals	Seasons
1	Alex Robertson	276	1989–90 1990–91 1991–92 1992–93 1993–94
2	London Warren	175	2006–07 2007–08 2008–09 2009–10
3	Tony Stanley	174	1997–98 1998–99 1999–00 2000–01
4	Scoochie Smith	172	2013–14 2014–15 2015–16 2016–17
5	Jim Paxson	168	1975–76 1976–77 1977–78 1978–79
6	Derrick Dukes	166	1990–91 1991–92 1992–93 1993–94
7	Negele Knight	162	1985–86 1987–88 1988–89 1989–90
8	Kyle Davis	160	2013–14 2014–15 2015–16 2016–17
9	Roosevelt Chapman	159	1980–81 1981–82 1982–83 1983–84
10	David Morris	155	1998–99 1999–00 2000–01 2001–02

Season
Rk	Player	Steals	Season
1	Alex Robertson	84	1991–92
2	Alex Robertson	78	1993–94
3	De'Shayne Montgomery	77	2025–26
4	Alex Robertson	72	1990–91
5	Jordan Sibert	62	2014–15
6	Malachi Smith	59	2021–22
7	Enoch Cheeks	58	2024–25
8	London Warren	57	2008–09
9	Negele Knight	54	1989–90
T-9	Javon Bennett	54	2025–26
T-9	Keonte Jones	54	2025–26

Single game
Rk	Player	Steals	Season	Opponent
1	Alex Robertson	9	1993–94	Miami (Oh.)
	Alex Robertson	9	1991–92	Notre Dame
	Jack Zimmerman	9	1976–77	Seton Hall
4	Negele Knight	7	1988–89	Miss. Valley
	Kevin Conrad	7	1982–83	La Salle
	Kevin Dillard	7	2011–12	Minnesota
	Jordan Sibert	7	2014–15	St. Bonaventure
	De’Shayne Montgomery	7	2025-26	Loyola-Chicago

== Blocks ==
Career
Rk	Player	Blocks	Seasons
1	DaRon Holmes II	215	2021–22 2022–23 2023-24
2	Chris Wright	162	2007–08 2008–09 2009–10 2010–11
3	Sean Finn	139	2000–01 2001–02 2002–03 2003–04
4	Roosevelt Chapman	124	1980–81 1981–82 1982–83 1983–84
5	Erv Giddings	116	1974–75 1975–76 1976–77 1977–78
6	Mark Ashman	96	1996–97 1997–98 1998–99 1999–00
7	Anthony Corbitt	82	1986–87 1987–88 1988–89 1989–90
8	Ed Young	78	1982–83 1983–84 1985–86 1986–87
9	Wes Coffee	77	1988–89 1989–90 1990–91 1991–92
10	Amaël L'Etang	74	2024–25 2025–26

Season
Rk	Player	Blocks	Season
1	DaRon Holmes II	81	2021–22
2	DaRon Holmes II	68	2023-24
3	DaRon Holmes II	66	2022–23
4	Steve McElvene	55	2015–16
5	Chris Wright	53	2009–10
6	Chris Wright	51	2010–11
7	Sean Finn	46	2001–02
8	Erv Giddings	45	1977–78
T-9	Sean Finn	44	2002–03
T-9	Chris Wright	44	2008–09

Single game
Rk	Player	Blocks	Season	Opponent
1	George Morrison	6	1981–82	Iona
	Erv Giddings	6	1976–77	Youngstown St.
	Sean Finn	6	2001–02	St. Joseph’s/A10
	Chris Wright	6	2010–11	La Salle
	Steve McElvene	6	2015–16	Saint Louis
	DaRon Holmes II	6	2021–22	Belmont
	DaRon Holmes II	6	2021–22	UMass Lowell
	DaRon Holmes II	6	2021–22	Rhode Island
	Zed Key	6	2024–25	Richmond
