= Frank L. Hayes =

American football and basketball player and coach

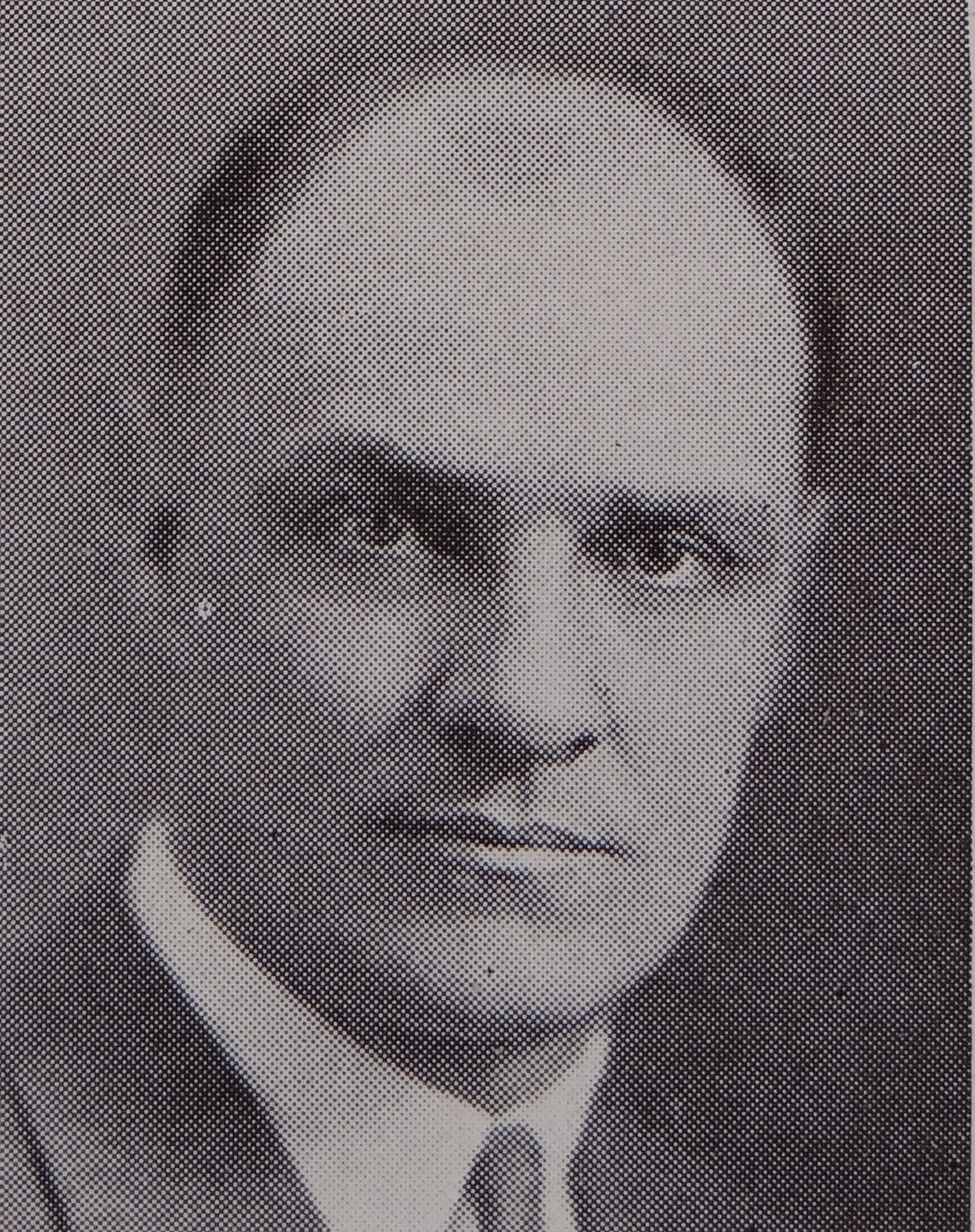
- Hayes from the 1925 Michiganensian

Biographical details
- Born: November 21, 1893
- Died: July 1, 1967 (aged 73); Ontario, Canada

Coaching career (HC unless noted)

Football
- c. 1920: McClain HS (OH)
- 1924: Michigan (assistant)
- 1927–1941: Marietta

Basketball
- c. 1920: McClain HS (OH)
- 1924–1926: Michigan (assistant)
- 1927–1942: Marietta

Administrative career (AD unless noted)
- 1926–1927: Grinnell

Head coaching record
- Overall: 41–60–8 (college football); 41–60–8 (college basketball); 89–8 (high school basketball)

Frank Louis "Duke" Hayes (November 21, 1893 – July 1, 1967) was an American football and basketball player, coach, and athletic director. He was a football and basketball player at Marietta College from 1915 to 1918. From 1919 to 1924, he was a physical education teacher and coach at McClain High School in Greenfield, Ohio. In the four years from 1920 to 1923, Hayes coached the McClain basketball team to an 89–8 record, outscoring opponents 3,319 to 1,251. In 1924, he was hired by the University of Michigan as an assistant basketball and football coach. He next served as the athletic director at Grinnell College from 1926 to 1927. From 1927 to 1941, he served as athletic director and head coach of the basketball and football teams at Marietta College. He was posthumously inducted into the Marietta College Hall of Fame in 1984.

== Early years ==
Hayes attended Marietta College in Marietta, Ohio. He earned eight varsity letters in basketball and football from 1915 to 1918. He played at the quarterback and halfback positions for the Marietta football team and was selected as the captain of the 1917 team. His collegiate career was interrupted by military service during World War I. During World War I, he was a member of the famous Camp Sherman football team. He graduated from Marietta in 1919.

== Coaching career ==
After graduating from Marietta, Hayes was hired in 1919 by McClain High School in Greenfield, Ohio. At McClain, he served as a physical education teacher and coach of the football, basketball, baseball and tennis teams. In the four years from 1920 to 1923, Hayes coached the McClain basketball team to an 89–8 record, outscoring opponents 3,319 to 1,251. The All-American Sports magazine "referred to McClain as the world's most remarkable high school coach and stated its basketball record was unparalleled in high school competition."

In 1924, Hayes was hired by the University of Michigan as an assistant basketball coach, holding that position from 1924 to 1926. He also served as an assistant football coach at Michigan in 1924.

In April 1926, he was hired as the director of physical education at Grinnell College in Grinnell, Iowa.

In March 1927, he was hired by his alma mater, Marietta College, to serve as a professor and director of physical education and athletics. He also served as the head coach of Marietta's basketball team for 15 years, compiling a record of 108–133 (.448). He was also the school's head football coach for 15 years from 1927 to 1941, compiling a record of 41–60–8 (.413). He served as the school's baseball coach for one year, compiling a record of 2–8. He was also the "prime mover" in the construction of Marietta's Municipal Stadium, later renamed Don Drumm Field.

== Later years ==
In March 1942, Hayes was granted a leave of absence from his post at Marietta to join the Army Air Corps following the United States' entry into World War II. He was inducted into the Air Corps as a captain. While serving in the Air Corps, he was stationed in the Pacific Theater of operations and reached the rank of lieutenant colonel.

After the war, Hayes served as the director of special services at the VA Hospital in Ft. Thomas, Kentucky, from 1946 to 1957. He retired in 1957 and moved to Tavares, Florida, with his wife.

Hayes died in 1967 at a vacation lodge in Ontario, Canada. He was inducted into the Marietta College Hall of Fame in 1984.
