= McClain High School (Greenfield, Ohio) =

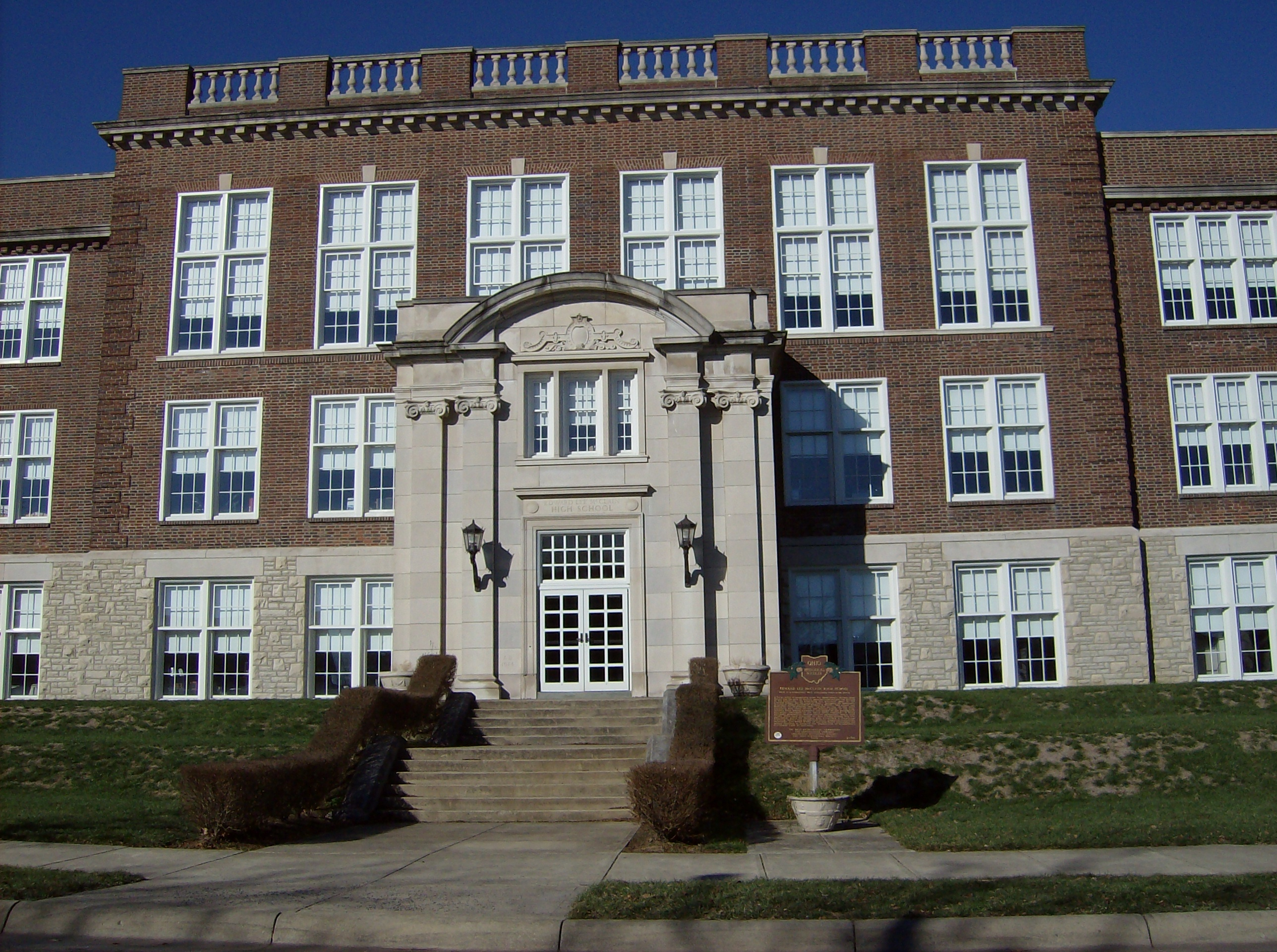

Location
- 200 North 5th Street; Greenfield, Ohio 45123; United States; 39°21′7″N 83°23′16″W

Information
- Type: Public high school
- Established: 1914
- School district: Greenfield Exempted Village Schools
- NCES School ID: 390454002203
- Principal: Matt Shelton
- Teaching staff: 31000 (on an FTE basis)
- Grades: 9–12
- Enrollment: 543 (2023-2024)
- Student to teacher ratio: 17.52
- Colors: Purple and gold
- Athletics conference: Frontier Athletic Conference
- Nickname: Tigers
- Accreditation: North Central Association of Colleges and Schools
- Website: www.greenfield.k12.oh.us/o/mhs

McClain High School is a public high school in Greenfield, Ohio, United States. It is part of the Greenfield Exempted Village Schools district.

== History ==
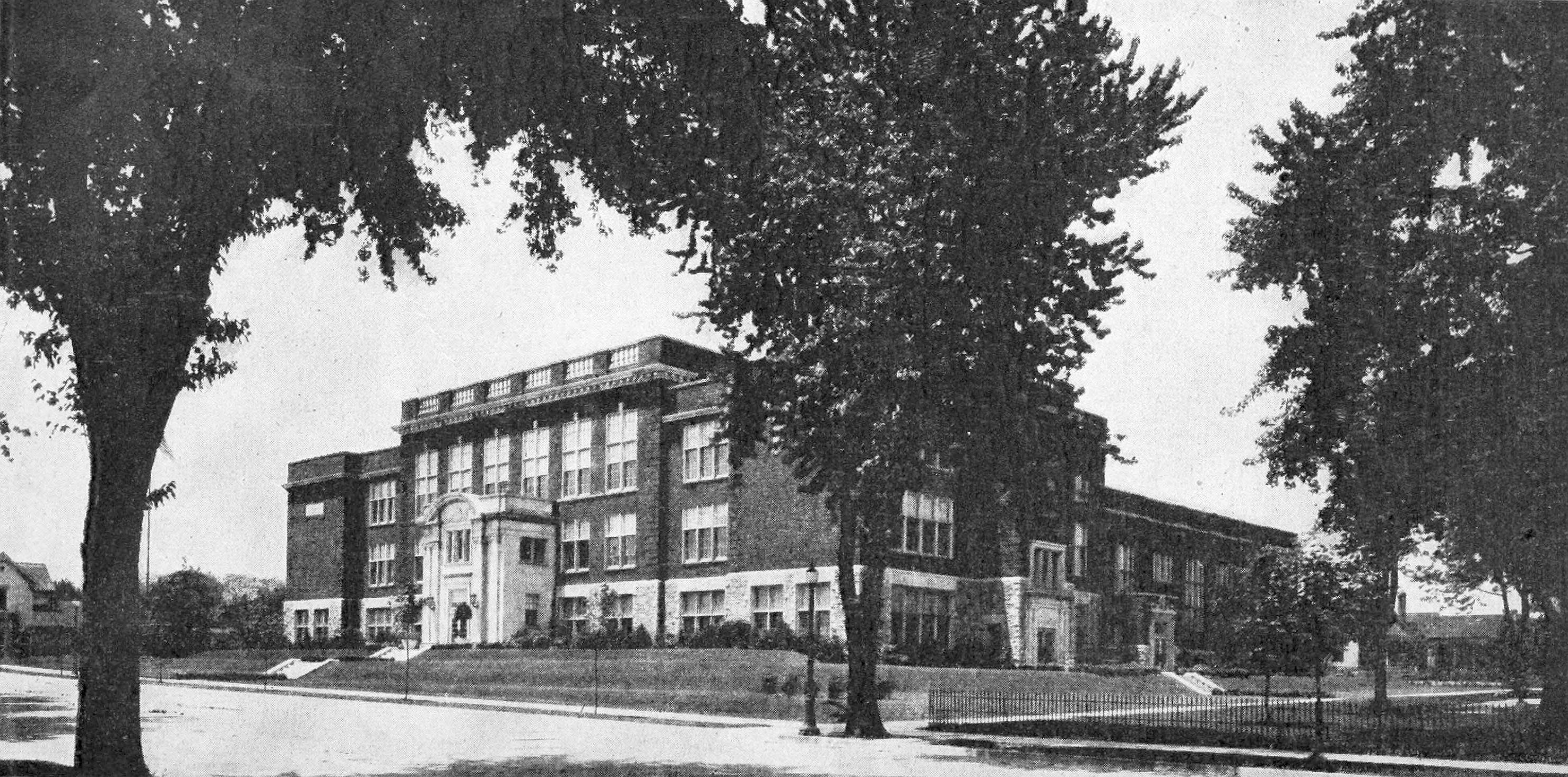
The Edward Lee McClain High School, 1922

The school was a gift to the community in 1912 from the inventor and local industrialist Edward Lee McClain. Construction on the school started in 1914, with the first classes held beginning in 1916. The building was designed by architect William B. Ittner. The McClain family later donated a vocational building, natatorium, and athletic fields adjoining the high school in 1923, at the same time that the community began construction of a new elementary building.

The school was almost torn down due to the high cost of remodeling and lack of finances. A large-scale community and historical effort led to the high school being saved. It is listed as an Ohio Historical Society landmark.

== Athletics ==
The school is a member of the Ohio High School Athletic Association and participates in the Frontier Athletic Conference (FAC). The swim team also participates in the SOSL (Southern Ohio Swim League) and, starting in 2008, the SCOL. Athletics include and are currently limited to:

=== Autumn ===
- Football (boys and girls)
- Cross country (boys and girls; separate)
- Soccer (boys and girls; separate)
- Volleyball (boys and girls)
- Golf (boys and girls; separate)
- Marching band (boys and girls; combined)
- Tigerettes (dance team for MB) (girls only)
- Football cheerleading (girls only)

=== Winter ===
- Basketball (boys and girls; separate)
- Wrestling
- Swimming (boys and girls; separate; combined in middle school)
- Wrestling (boys and girls; combined)
- Basketball cheerleading (girls only)
- Quick Recall (boys and girls; combined)

=== Spring ===
- Baseball (boys only)
- Softball (girls only)
- Track and field (boys and girls; separate)

== Other activities ==
Other activities include concert, symphonic, marching, jazz, and pep bands; Hi-Y; McClain Youth in Action; National Honor Society; National Art Honor Society; Future Farmers of America; FBLA-PBL; FCCLA; Student Council; Junior/Senior Executive Committee; an independent television and radio program; Environthon Team; Annual Staff; concert, symphonic, and show choirs; and Theatrical/Drama and Chess Clubs.

== Facilities ==
There are approximately 200 paintings, murals, statues, and other forms of art adorning the hallways and classrooms. These include a marble staircase, a statue of Giuliano de' Medici, the Rookwood tile backed water fountains, Tiffany lamps and the Hiram Powers' marble bust of Ginevra, with Ginevra being found only in this institution and in one other. It has a pool that was constructed in 1923, making it the oldest high school pool still in use, multiple stories and buildings, a structured row of colonnades lining the buildings, two gyms, a trophy hall, a courtyard and clocktower, and a track and field, among other resources.

== Notable alumni ==
- Don Grate, professional baseball and basketball player
- Bill Uhl, professional basketball player

== Notable staff ==
- Frank L. Hayes, coach
