= Bill Uhl =

American basketball player (1933–2022)

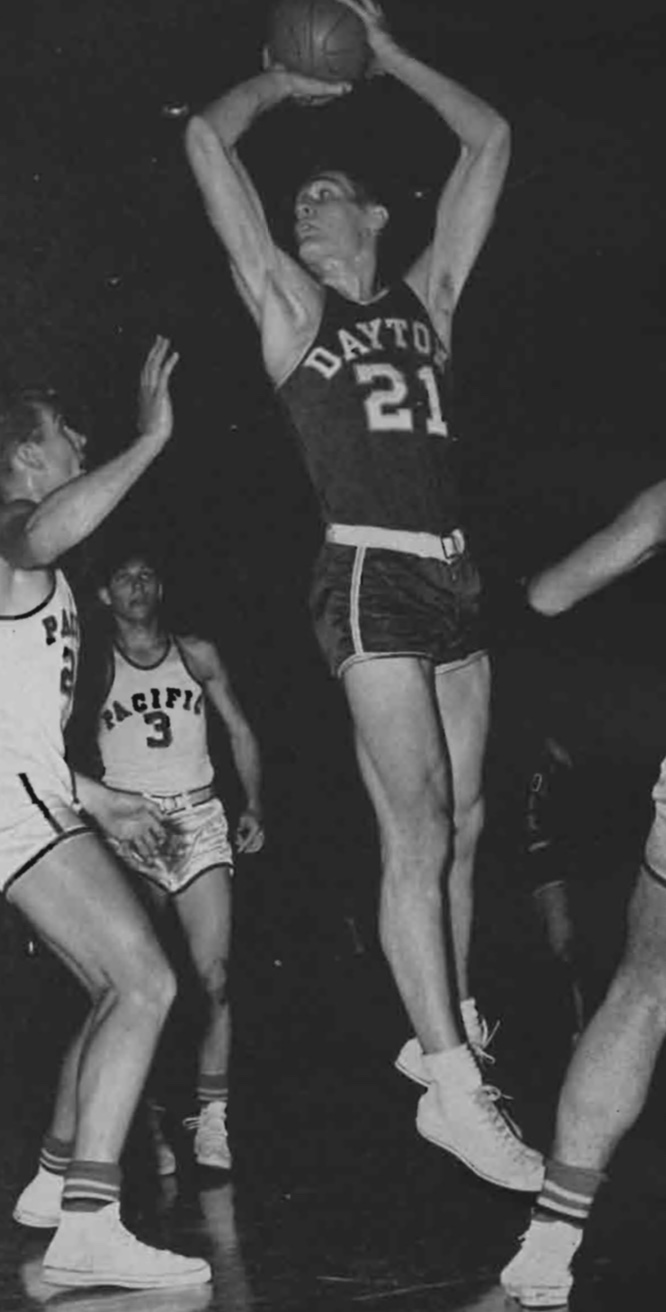
- Uhl from the 1955 Daytonian

Personal information
- Born: January 7, 1933 Greenfield, Ohio, U.S.
- Died: December 24, 2022 (aged 89) Dayton, Ohio, U.S.
- Listed height: 7 ft 0 in (2.13 m)
- Listed weight: 245 lb (111 kg)

Career information
- High school: McClain (Greenfield, Ohio)
- College: Dayton (1953–1956)
- NBA draft: 1956: 5th round, 32nd overall pick
- Drafted by: Rochester Royals
- Position: Center
- Number: 21

Career highlights
- Consensus second-team All-American (1956)
- Stats at Basketball Reference

William George Uhl Sr. (January 7, 1933 – December 24, 2022) was an American basketball player. The 7 ft 0 in (2.13 m) center was a consensus second team All-American player at the University of Dayton in 1956.

== Early life and college career ==
Uhl starred at McClain High School in Greenfield, Ohio, and graduated in 1951. He accepted a scholarship offer to Ohio State University, and followed in the footsteps of Greenfield's Don Grate. Uhl, however experienced a difficult adjustment in Columbus and dropped out of Ohio State shortly after the beginning of his second semester.

Uhl transferred and then played three varsity seasons at Dayton, from 1953 to 1956. He was the school's first seven-footer and earned the nickname "The Greenfield Goliath." For his career, Uhl averaged 18.5 points and 14.6 rebounds per game. He finished with 1,627 total points in his collegiate days.

The Flyers also had great team success during Uhl's tenure, going 75–15 over his three years at the school, with three NIT appearances—including trips to the championship game in both 1955 and 1956. The Flyers also achieved the highest national ranking in their history during the 1955–56 season, and ranked #2 behind undefeated defending national champion San Francisco.

== Professional career ==
Following the completion of his collegiate career, Uhl was drafted by the Rochester Royals in the 1956 NBA draft. But instead, he opted to enter the insurance business. He opened a successful agency in the south Dayton suburbs and enjoyed a successful business career until his retirement. Uhl's son, Bill Uhl Jr., who also played basketball at Dayton, continues to operate the insurance agency his father founded.

Uhl was inducted into the University of Dayton Athletic Hall of Fame in 1968 and was named to the school's All-Century team during the 2003–04 season. In 2013, he was inducted into the Ohio Basketball Hall of Fame.

== Personal life ==
Uhl married his wife, Cynthia, in 1957 and they resided for many years in Washington Township near Dayton. The Uhls had five children and 11 grandchildren.
