= Jim O'Brien (basketball, born 1952) =

American basketball coach (born 1952)

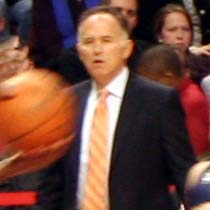
- O'Brien in 2009

Philadelphia 76ers
- Position: Senior advisor
- League: NBA

Personal information
- Born: February 11, 1952 (age 74) Philadelphia, Pennsylvania, U.S.
- Listed height: 6 ft 0 in (1.83 m)
- Listed weight: 190 lb (86 kg)

Career information
- High school: Roman Catholic (Philadelphia, Pennsylvania)
- College: Saint Joseph's (1971–1974)
- Coaching career: 1974–2019

Career history

Coaching
- 1974–1975: Wheeling Jesuit (assistant)
- 1975–1976: Pembroke State (assistant)
- 1976–1977: Maryland (assistant)
- 1977–1978: Saint Joseph's (assistant)
- 1978–1982: Oregon (assistant)
- 1982–1987: Wheeling Jesuit
- 1987–1989: New York Knicks (assistant)
- 1989–1994: Dayton
- 1994–1997: Kentucky (assistant)
- 1997–2001: Boston Celtics (assistant)
- 2001–2004: Boston Celtics
- 2004–2005: Philadelphia 76ers
- 2007–2011: Indiana Pacers
- 2012–2013: Dallas Mavericks (assistant)
- 2016–2019: Philadelphia 76ers (assistant)

Career highlights
- As head coach: MCC tournament champion (1990); As assistant coach: SEC tournament champion (1994, 1995, 1997); NCAA champion (1996)

James Francis Xavier O'Brien (born February 11, 1952) is an American basketball coach who is currently senior advisor for the Philadelphia 76ers. O'Brien was previously an assistant and head coach at both the college and NBA levels and was head coach at Wheeling Jesuit from 1982 to 1987, Dayton from 1989 to 1994, the Boston Celtics from 2001 to 2004, Philadelphia 76ers in 2004–05, and Indiana Pacers from 2007 to 2011.

== Early life and education ==
O'Brien is the son-in-law of Hall of Fame coach Jack Ramsay. Born and raised in Philadelphia, O'Brien graduated from Roman Catholic High School of Philadelphia in 1970 and St. Joseph's University in 1974. At St. Joseph's, O'Brien started on the Hawks basketball team for three seasons. He earned an M.B.A. from the University of Maryland in 1981.

== Coaching career ==
O'Brien was also head coach at Wheeling Jesuit University from 1982 to 1987 and the University of Dayton from 1989 to 1994. He led the Dayton Flyers to the second round of the NCAA tournament in his first season, after winning the Midwestern Collegiate Conference; however he led the Flyers to just 10 wins in his last two seasons at the school and was fired after the 1993–1994 season. O'Brien then served as an assistant coach to Rick Pitino at the University of Kentucky from 1994 to 1997 and then with the Boston Celtics from 1997 to 2001.

O'Brien was the head coach of the Boston Celtics from 2001–2004, replacing Rick Pitino. He worked to rebuild the struggling Celtics and led them twice to the playoffs. During the 2003–04 NBA season, however, O'Brien consistently fought with Celtics' general manager Danny Ainge over short-term versus long-term goals. Ainge was looking to completely redo the roster, and traded Eric Williams and Tony Battie, two of O'Brien's favorite hardworking players in December 2003. As a result of the conflict, O'Brien shocked everyone in the Celtics community by resigning in January 2004.

He was hired as head coach of the Philadelphia 76ers during the 2004–05 season. The 76ers made the playoffs in his one season as coach after missing the postseason the previous year, and although O'Brien had a multiyear contract, he was fired. Billy King hired Maurice Cheeks as head coach after Cheeks was fired by the Portland Trail Blazers.

The Indianapolis Star reported on May 31, 2007, that he would coach the Indiana Pacers. He replaced Rick Carlisle, who was fired after four years, when the team failed in 2006–07 to make the playoffs for the first time in a decade. On January 31, 2011, Pacers President of Basketball Operations Larry Bird relieved O'Brien of his coaching duties. He was replaced by assistant Frank Vogel on an interim basis, who remained as the Pacers' head coach until the 2015–16 season.

In the 2012–13 season, O'Brien was an assistant coach for the Dallas Mavericks. After the season, O'Brien retired from the team to spend more time with family.

In 2016, O'Brien was hired by the Philadelphia 76ers as an assistant coach to Brett Brown.

== Broadcasting career ==
O'Brien was also an analyst for ESPN's NBA coverage from 2005 to 2007.

== Personal life ==
O'Brien's son, Jack O'Brien, is a noted internet comedian and podcast host.

== Head coaching record ==
=== College ===
Record table
Season	Team	Overall	Conference	Standing	Postseason
Wheeling Jesuit Cardinals (West Virginia Intercollegiate Athletic Conference) (1982–1987)
1982–83	Wheeling Jesuit	17–14	7–10	T–7th	
1983–84	Wheeling Jesuit	13–15	8–9	9th	
1984–85	Wheeling Jesuit	13–15	8–9	8th	
1985–86	Wheeling Jesuit	18–10	10–8	8th	
1986–87	Wheeling Jesuit	13–15	unknown	10th	
Wheeling Jesuit:		74–69 (.517)	33–36 (.478)		
Dayton Flyers (Midwestern Collegiate Conference) (1989–1993)
1989–90	Dayton	22–10	10–4	2nd	NCAA Second Round
1990–91	Dayton	14–15	8–6	4th	
1991–92	Dayton	15–15	5–5	4th	
1992–93	Dayton	4–26	3–11	7th	
Dayton Flyers (Great Midwest Conference) (1993–1994)
1993–94	Dayton	6–21	1–11	7th	
Dayton:		61–87 (.412)	27–56 (.422)		
Total:		135–156 (.464)			
National champion Postseason invitational champion Conference regular season champion Conference regular season and conference tournament champion Division regular season champion Division regular season and conference tournament champion Conference tournament champion

=== NBA ===
Legend
Regular season	G	Games coached	W	Games won	L	Games lost	W–L %	Win–loss %
Playoffs	PG	Playoff games	PW	Playoff wins	PL	Playoff losses	PW–L %	Playoff win–loss %

Team	Year	G	W	L	W–L%	Finish	PG	PW	PL	PW–L%	Result
Boston	2000–01	48	24	24	.500	5th in Atlantic	—	—	—	—	Missed Playoffs
Boston	2001–02	82	49	33	.598	2nd in Atlantic	16	9	7	.563	Lost in Conf. Finals
Boston	2002–03	82	44	38	.537	3rd in Atlantic	10	4	6	.400	Lost in Conf. Semifinals
Boston	2003–04	46	22	24	.478	(resigned)	—	—	—	—	—
Philadelphia	2004–05	82	43	39	.524	2nd in Atlantic	5	1	4	.200	Lost in First Round
Indiana	2007–08	82	36	46	.439	3rd in Central	—	—	—	—	Missed Playoffs
Indiana	2008–09	82	36	46	.439	4th in Central	—	—	—	—	Missed Playoffs
Indiana	2009–10	82	32	50	.390	4th in Central	—	—	—	—	Missed Playoffs
Indiana	2010–11	44	17	27	.386	(fired)	—	—	—	—	—
Career		630	303	327	.481		31	14	17	.452	
