= C.R. Patterson and Sons =

American car manufacturing company

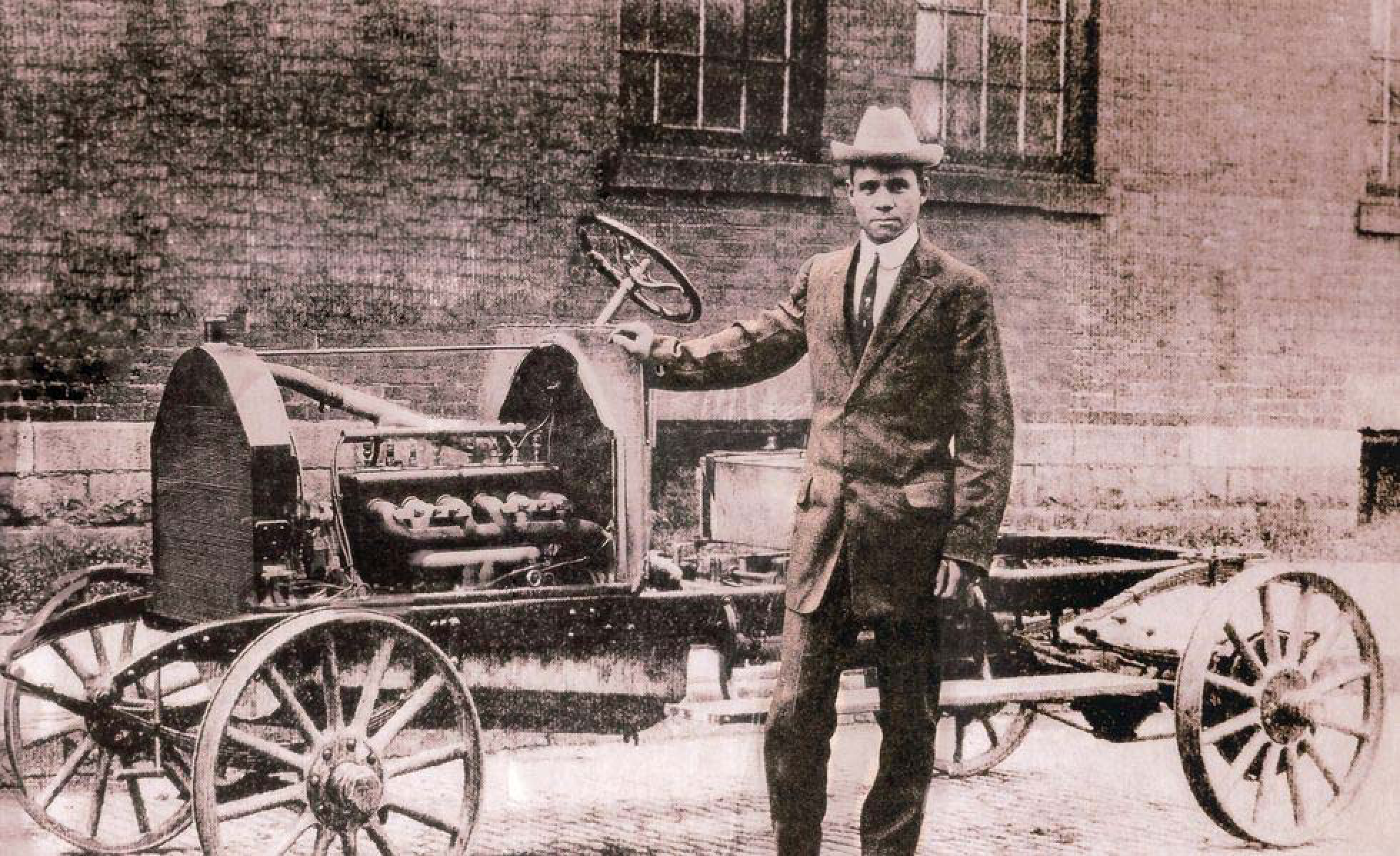
- Formerly: J. P. Lowe & Company; C.R. Patterson, Son & Company; C.R. Patterson and Sons Carriage Company
- Industry: Automotive manufacturing company
- Founded: 1893
- Founder: Charles Richard Patterson
- Defunct: 1939
- Successor: Greenfield Bus Body Company; Gallia Body Company
- Headquarters: Greenfield, Ohio, US
- Key people: Charles Richard Patterson; Samuel Patterson; Postell Patterson
- Products: Patterson-Greenfield automobile

C.R. Patterson and Sons was an American automotive company headquartered in Greenfield, Ohio and for one year in Gallia, Ohio; founded by Charles Richard Patterson.

The Pattersons were the first African Americans to manufacture automobiles, their company manufacturing and marketing the Patterson-Greenfield automobile for model years 1914-17 with overall production reaching 150 — none known to have survived.

As the only known black-owned automakers, founded by a formerly enslaved person, operating during a period of cultural oppression, successful for three generations, Charles Richard Patterson and Frederick Patterson were inducted into the Automotive Hall of Fame in 2021.

== History ==
=== Precursors ===
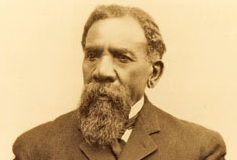
Charles Richard Patterson

Charles "Rich" Richard Patterson (1833–1910) founded precursor companies to C.R. Patterson and Sons. Patterson was born — into slavery — in 1833 to Charles and Nancy Patterson of Virginia. The family moved to Ohio between 1841 and 1842. They were listed in the 1850 census in Greenfield, Ohio, which was a busy station on the underground railroad. He initially worked at Dines and Simpson Carriage and Coach Makers Company, and learned blacksmithing.

Charles Patterson partnered with a local carriage builder, J.P. Lowe, a white man, and they created J.P. Lowe & Company in 1873. By 1888, the business employed 10 people, which was considered successful for its time. The United States was experiencing the Panic of 1893, a financial crisis, and business was suffering.

Patterson bought Lowe's shares and to mark the inclusion of his son Samuel renamed the company C.R. Patterson, Son in 1893. Samuel Patterson became ill in 1897, and died in 1899. The eldest son Frederick Douglas Patterson moved home to help with the business.

By 1900, the company was producing 28 different horse-drawn carriage styles including buggies, backboards, phaetons, surreys, and the popular doctor's buggy. They had 50 employees, and were able to manufacture approximately 500 horse-drawn carriages a year.

=== Automobile manufacturing ===
After Charles Patterson's death in 1910, his son, Frederick Douglas Patterson, took over the carriage business aiming to manufacture their own "horseless carriage," initially offering local automotive service. On September 23, 1915, the first C.R. Patterson and Sons automobile was assembled, a two-door coupe. The first cars were sold for $685, with additional reports of the car selling for $850 (or $17,741 to $22,014 adjusted for inflation in 2021).

=== Bus and truck manufacturing ===
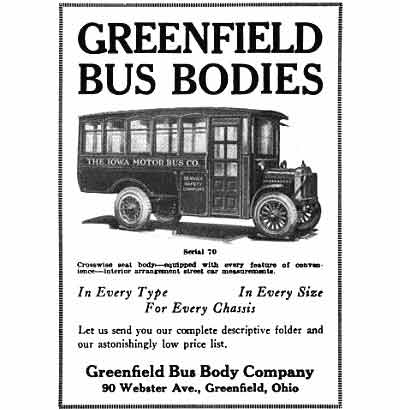
1923 Greenfield bus advertisement

In 1918, C.R. Patterson & Sons halted their auto production and concentrated once again on the repair side of the business. By the 1920s, they started focusing on building and designing truck and bus bodies, which were fitted to chassis made by other manufactures. The company was renamed Greenfield Bus Body Company. Frederick Douglas Patterson died in 1932, and his son Postell Patterson (1906–1981) took over the business.

Most of the bus bodies were purchased by school boards in Southern Ohio, West Virginia, and Kentucky, as well as the Ohio Transit Company and used in Cincinnati and Cleveland.

In 1938, the company was reorganized under the name Gallia Body Company and the headquarters moved to Gallia, Ohio. Unable to raise enough money, the company closed in 1939.
