= Wenona Marlin =

American suffragist, journalist and writer

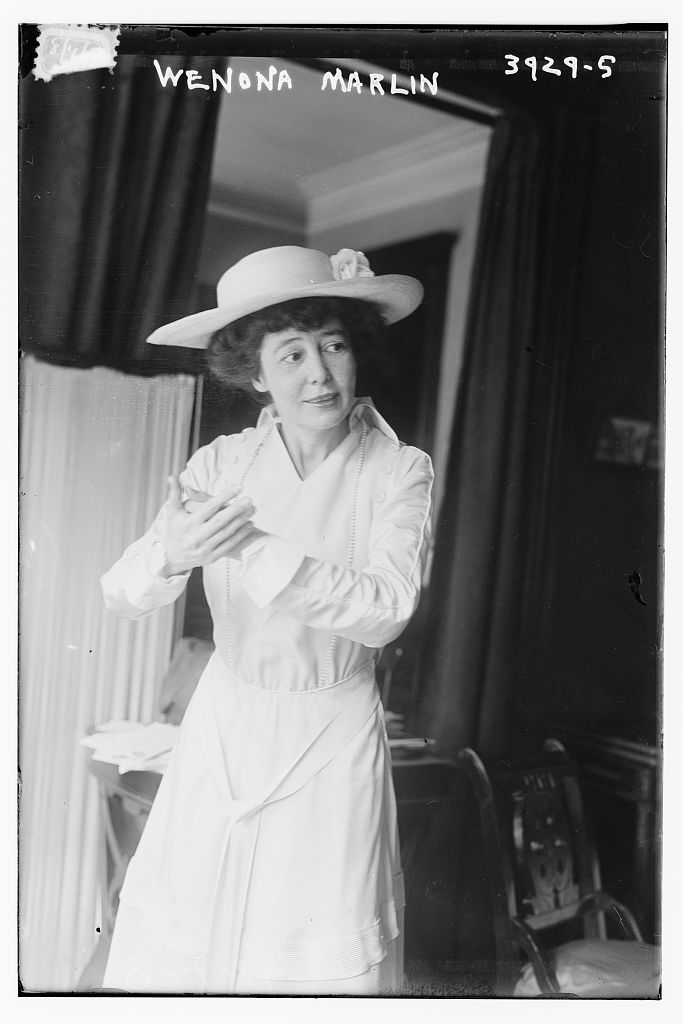
- Wenona Marlin in 1916
- Born: November 15, 1871; Greenfield, Ohio, US
- Died: September 8, 1945 (aged 73); New York City, US
- Occupation: Writer

Wenona Marlin (November 15, 1871 — September 8, 1945) was an American suffragist, journalist, and writer.

== Early life ==
Wenona Marlin was from Greenfield, Ohio, the daughter of Vance Marlin, a Union Army veteran, and Mary Ellen Porter Marlin. She attended Greenfield High School as a member of the Class of 1888.

== Career ==
Marlin was active in the suffrage movement in New York City. In 1912 she reported to a polling station in Washington Square, although New York women did not yet have the vote, and refused to leave, claiming that she only wanted to observe the process. She spoke at suffrage meetings and was a frequent author in the letters section of the New York Times. "The fact that many men today regard the vote with such little respect is partly due to the fact that never did anything to earn it," Marlin commented in one such letter in 1915. In 1917, she joined the New York chapter of the Congressional Union on a trip to Washington, to take a shift as a White House "silent sentinel". After suffrage was won, Marlin continued to be active with the National Woman's Party in New York.

Literary works by Wenona Marlin include Will o' the Wisp and Other Stories (1912). As a journalist, Marlin reported from the construction of the Panama Canal, then told the story of her efforts to prove her American citizenship as a single woman, upon returning to the United States.

== Personal life ==
Wenona Marlin died in New York in 1945, aged 73 years.
