= Gallia, Ohio =

Unincorporated community in Ohio, U.S.

Coordinates: 38°49′51″N 82°31′04″W

Gallia is an unincorporated community in Gallia County, in the U.S. state of Ohio.

== History ==
From 1938 until 1939, the Gallia Body Company (formally named C.R. Patterson and Sons), a vehicle body manufacturing company operated in the town of Gallia.

A variant name was Gallia Furnace. Gallia Furnace was laid out in 1846 when a blast furnace was established there.
