= Frederick Patterson =

American entrepreneur (1871–1932)

Frederick Douglass Patterson
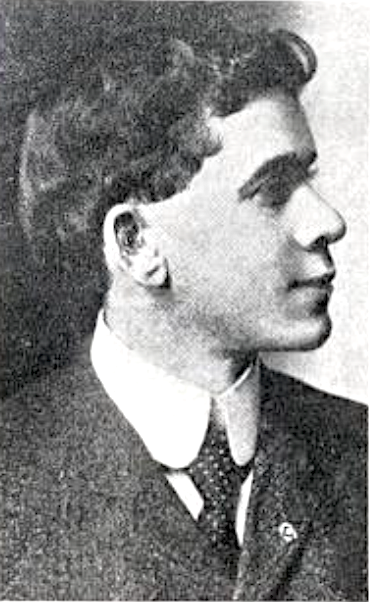
- Patterson, c. 1910
- Born: September 17, 1871; Greenfield, Ohio, U.S.
- Died: January 18, 1932 (aged 60)
- Other name: Fred Patterson
- Education: Ohio State University
- Employer: C.R. Patterson and Sons
- Known for: First African American car manufacturer
- Children: 2
- Father: Charles Richard Patterson

Frederick Douglass Patterson (1871 – 1932) was an American entrepreneur who ran the family business, C.R. Patterson and Sons, and the creator of the Patterson-Greenfield automobile of 1915.

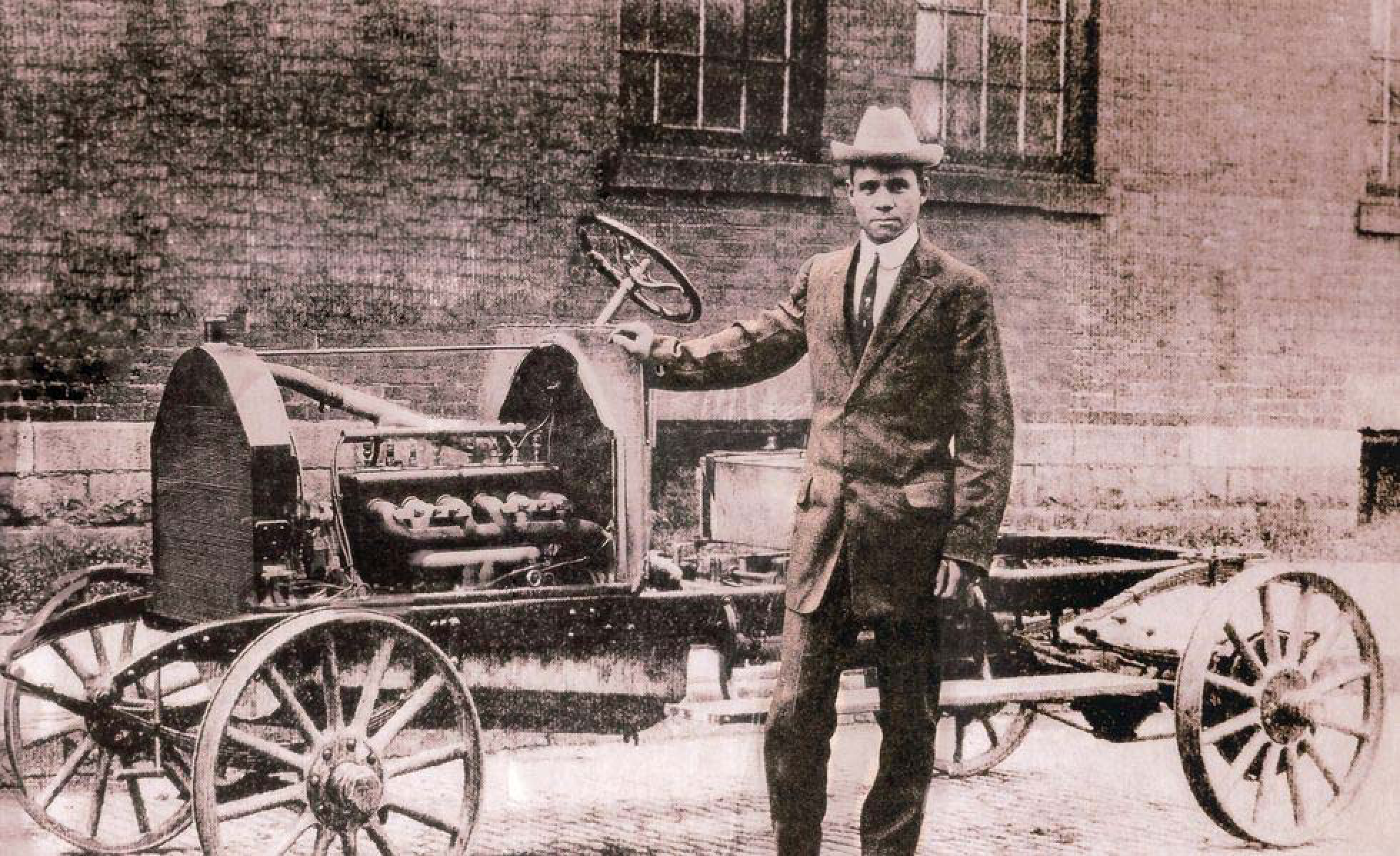
Built by the first African American-owned automobile manufacturer, The C.R. Patterson and Sons Company, the Patterson-Greenfield automobile (pictured here) debuted in 1915 and had a four-cylinder Continental engine, comparable to that of the Ford Model T.

While in college at Ohio State University, he was the first African American to play on its football team. He returned to Greenfield, Ohio to join his father in his carriage business, which became C.R. Patterson and Sons. The younger man saw opportunity in the new horseless carriages, and converted the company in the early 1900s to manufacture automobiles, making 150 of them. Later he shifted to making buses and trucks, and renamed his company as Greenfield Bus Body Company.

== Early life and education ==
Named after the noted abolitionist Frederick Douglass, Patterson was born in 1871, one of five children of Josephine Utz (also spelled as Outz, or Qutz) and Charles Richard Patterson. His siblings were Mary, Catherine "Kate", Dollie, and his younger brother Samuel C.

Their father was a former slave who had moved to Greenfield, Ohio from Virginia shortly before the American Civil War. After getting established as a blacksmith in town, Charles married Josephine Utz, a young local mulatto woman of German descent. In 1873, Charles and J.P. Lowe, a white carriage maker, established a successful carriage manufacturing business called J.P. Lowe & Company.

The Pattersons cared deeply about the education of their two sons, Frederick and Samuel. Frederick was refused admission to the all-white Greenfield High School, and his father sued the school board in 1886 to admit his son. Frederick graduated from Greenfield High School in 1888, and went on to Ohio State University in Columbus, Ohio. While at the university, he played on the football team in his junior year on the 1891 Ohio State Buckeyes football team, the first African American to do so.

== Career and family business ==
Patterson withdrew from college in his senior year before graduating, taking a job as a high school history teacher in Louisville, Kentucky. It was a different career than his father's business, where his brother Samuel was already working.

Patterson took over the business after his father died in 1910. Seeing the rise of "horseless carriages", Patterson started development of the first Patterson-Greenfield car, completed in 1915. His two styles competed with Henry Ford's model T and sold for $685. He was the first African American to own and operate a car manufacturing company.

After producing between 30 and 150 vehicles he had difficulty getting financing for expansion. Patterson decided to change his business rather than compete head on with the major Detroit industry.

In 1920, he changed the name of his company to Greenfield Bus Body Company. He built bodies for trucks and buses upon a chassis made by other manufacturers. The Great Depression had a devastating effect on his company, as widespread financial problems caused his customers to cut back on bus orders. Patterson died in 1932. His son, Postell Patterson (1906–1981), who had worked with him, closed the business in 1939.

No Patterson-Greenfield autos are known to exist, but some of his father's C.R. Patterson & Sons Company carriages have survived.

Patterson is featured on the documentary series Profiles of African-American Success (2014).

== Politics ==
At a time of a rise in fraternal organizations, he joined the Freemasons, where he rose to the level of Worshipful Master of the Greenfield Cedar Grove Masonic Lodge#17. Patterson also joined the Third Wind Foraker club.

He became the 2nd vice-president of the National Negro Business League, during Booker T. Washington's term as leader.

Patterson joined the Republican Party and served as a Greenfield's annual delegate to the Ohio Republican Party caucus. As a delegate and an African-American businessman, he was important to the Warren G. Harding 1920 campaign in turning out the Ohio black vote. For his work in the 1920 election, he was rewarded with a position as alternate delegate to the 1924 Republican National Convention.

== Personal life ==
Patterson married in 1899, and fathered sons Frederick Postell Patterson (1903–1973) and Postell Patterson (1906–1981).

Patterson was part of the African Methodist Episcopal Church (AME Church).

Patterson died after a long illness in January 1932, at his home in Greenfield.
