= 1989–90 Dayton Flyers men's basketball team =

American college basketball season

1989–90 Dayton Flyers men's basketball

MCC tournament champions

NCAA tournament, second round
- Conference: Midwestern Collegiate Conference
- Record: 22–10 (10–4 MCC)
- Head coach: Jim O'Brien (1st season)
- Home arena: University of Dayton Arena

1989–90 Midwestern Collegiate Conference men's basketball standings
| | Conf. | | | | Overall |
| Team | W | | L | PCT | W | | L | PCT |
|---|---|---|---|---|---|---|---|---|
| No. 25 Xavier | 12 | – | 2 | .857 | 28 | – | 5 | .848 |
| Dayton † | 10 | – | 4 | .714 | 22 | – | 10 | .688 |
| Saint Louis | 9 | – | 5 | .643 | 21 | – | 12 | .636 |
| Marquette | 9 | – | 5 | .643 | 15 | – | 14 | .517 |
| Evansville | 8 | – | 6 | .571 | 17 | – | 15 | .531 |
| Loyola (IL) | 3 | – | 11 | .214 | 7 | – | 22 | .241 |
| Detroit | 3 | – | 11 | .214 | 10 | – | 18 | .357 |
| Butler | 2 | – | 12 | .143 | 6 | – | 22 | .214 |
† 1990 MCC tournament winner Rankings from AP

The 1989–90 Dayton Flyers men's basketball team represented the University of Dayton during the 1989–90 NCAA Division I men's basketball season. The Flyers, led by first year head coach Jim O'Brien, played their home games at the University of Dayton Arena and were members of the Midwestern Collegiate Conference. They finished the season 22–10, 10–4 in MCC play. They won the program's first MCC tournament title after defeating regular season champion Xavier in the championship game. Dayton received the MCC's automatic bid to the NCAA tournament where they upset Illinois in the first round. They lost to eventual Final Four participant Arkansas, 86–84, in the second round.

== Roster ==
1989–90 Dayton Flyers men's basketball team
Players
Coaches

| Pos. | # | Name | Height | Weight | Year | Previous school | Hometown |
|---|---|---|---|---|---|---|---|
| G | | Alex Robertson | — | — | Fr |
| G | 32 | Negele Knight | 6 ft 1 in (1.85 m) | 170 lb (77 kg) | Sr | Saint Martin de Porres | Detroit, Michigan |

Head coach

- Jim O'Brien (Saint Joseph's)

Assistant coach(es)

Legend

- (C) Team captain
- (S) Suspended
- (I) Ineligible
- (W) Walk-on
- Injured
- Current redshirt

== Schedule and results ==
| Date time, TV | Rank^{#} | Opponent^{#} | Result | Record | Site (attendance) city, state |
Regular season
| Nov 25, 1989* | | Fairleigh Dickinson | W 105-97 | 1–0 (0–0) | University of Dayton Arena (10,951); Dayton, Ohio |
| Nov 29, 1989* | | Furman | W 92-86 | 2–0 (0–0) | University of Dayton Arena (11,043); Dayton, Ohio |
| Dec 2, 1989* | | Princeton | W 68-62 | 3-0 (0–0) | University of Dayton Arena (12,022); Dayton, Ohio |
| Dec 6, 1989* | | at Miami (FL) | L 82-87 | 3-1 (0–0) | Miami Arena (1,492); Miami, Florida |
| Dec 9, 1989* | | The Citadel | W 97-76 | 4-1 (0–0) | University of Dayton Arena (11,769); Dayton, Ohio |
| Dec 16, 1989* | | at Cincinnati | L 88-90 | 4-2 (0–0) | Myrl H. Shoemaker Center (8,532); Cincinnati, Ohio |
| Dec 20, 1989* | | at DePaul | W 86-73 | 5-2 (0–0) | Rosemont Horizon (8,405); Rosemont, IL, Illinois |
| Dec 23, 1989* | | Miami (OH) | W 97-81 | 6-2 (0–0) | University of Dayton Arena (12,436); Dayton, Ohio |
| Dec 27, 1989* | | Southern | L 105-114 | 6-3 (0–0) | University of Dayton Arena (13,064); Dayton, Ohio |
| Dec 30, 1989* | | Bradley | W 98-61 | 7-3 (0–0) | University of Dayton Arena (12,103); Dayton, Ohio |
| Jan 6, 1990* | | Wright State; Gem City Jam | L 99-101 | 7-4 (0–0) | University of Dayton Arena (13,511); Dayton, Ohio |
| Jan 11, 1990 | | Marquette | L 84-95 | 7–5 (0–1) | University of Dayton Arena (11,261); Dayton, Ohio |
| Jan 13, 1990 | | Loyola (Ill) | W 88-71 | 8–5 (1–1) | University of Dayton Arena (12,193); Dayton, Ohio |
| Jan 18, 1990 | | at St Louis | L 69-95 | 8–6 (1–2) | Kiel Auditorium (7,541); St Louis, Missouri |
| Jan 20, 1990 | | at Evansville | W 88-68 | 9–6 (2–2) | Roberts Municipal Stadium (11,237); Evansville, Indiana |
| Jan 25, 1990 | | Butler | W 86-62 | 10–6 (3–2) | University of Dayton Arena (12,102); Dayton, Ohio |
| Jan 27, 1990 | | Detroit Mercy | W 100-80 | 11–6 (4–2) | University of Dayton Arena (13,511); Dayton, Ohio |
| Jan 30, 1990* | | at Notre Dame | L 79-97 | 11–7 (4–2) | Joyce Center (10,104); South Bend, Indiana |
| Feb 3, 1990 | No. 23 | at Xavier | L 81-88 | 11–8 (4–3) | Cincinnati Gardens (10,043); Cincinnati, Ohio |
| Feb 8, 1990 | | at Loyola (Ill) | L 94-96 | 11–9 (4–4) | Alumni Gym (801); Chicago, Illinois |
| Feb 10, 1990 | | at Marquette | W 79-77 | 12–9 (5–4) | Bradley Center (14,988); Milwaukee, Wisconsin |
| Feb 15, 1990 | | St Louis | W 84-81 ^{OT} | 13–9 (6–4) | University of Dayton Arena (11,401); Dayton, Ohio |
| Feb 17, 1990 | | Evansville | W 81-58 | 14–9 (7–4) | University of Dayton Arena (12,410); Dayton, Ohio |
| Feb 22, 1990 | | at Butler | W 88-82 | 15–9 (8–4) | Hinkle Fieldhouse (2,312); Indianapolis, Indiana |
| Feb 24, 1990 | | at Detroit Mercy | W 88-82 | 16–9 (9–4) | Calihan Hall (4,155); Detroit, Michigan |
| Feb 28, 1990* | | Notre Dame | W 97-79 | 17–9 (10–4) | University of Dayton Arena (13,511); Dayton, Ohio |
| Mar 3, 1990 | | No. 19 Xavier | W 111–108 | 18–9 (10–4) | University of Dayton Arena (13,511); Dayton, Ohio |
MCC tournament
| Mar 8, 1990* | (2) | (7) Detroit Mercy; Quarterfinals | W 90–72 | 19–9 | University of Dayton Arena (11,199); Dayton, Ohio |
| Mar 9, 1990* | (2) | (6) Loyola; Semifinals | W 97–95 | 20–9 | University of Dayton Arena (13,202); Dayton, Ohio |
| Mar 10, 1990* | (2) | (1) No. 24 Xavier; Championship | W 98–89 | 21–9 | University of Dayton Arena (13,202); Dayton, Ohio |
NCAA tournament
| Mar 15, 1990* | (12 MW) | vs. (5 MW) No. 18 Illinois; First Round | W 88–86 | 22–9 | Frank Erwin Center (11,578); Austin, Texas |
| Mar 17, 1990* | (12 MW) | vs. (4 MW) No. 7 Arkansas; Second Round | L 84–86 | 22–10 | Frank Erwin Center (15,884); Austin, Texas |
*Non-conference game. ^{#}Rankings from AP Poll. (#) Tournament seedings in parentheses. MW=Midwest. All times are in Eastern Time.

== NBA draft ==
| Round | Pick | Player | NBA Club |
|---|---|---|---|
| 2 | 31 | Negele Knight | Phoenix Suns |
