= Charles Richard Patterson =

African American carriage manufacturer and civil rights activist

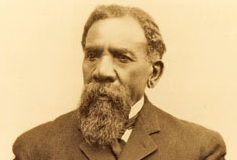
- Born: April 1833; Virginia, US
- Died: April 26, 1910 (aged 76–77); Greenfield, Ohio, US
- Other names: C.R. Patterson, Rich Patterson
- Occupations: Carriage manufacture and design
- Employer: C.R. Patterson and Sons
- Known for: Early African-American manufacturer and entrepreneur, civil rights activist
- Children: 6, including Frederick

Charles "Rich" Richard Patterson (1833–1910) was an African-American carriage manufacturer, entrepreneur and civil rights activist. He founded precursor companies to C.R. Patterson and Sons.

== Early life ==
Patterson was born in April 1833 as a slave on a Virginia plantation. He was the oldest of the thirteen children of Charles and Nancy Patterson. There are conflicting stories on how he left the plantation, he ended up living in Greenfield, Ohio, which was also the site of an underground railroad station. It is thought his family left Virginia c.1843, before the American Civil War in 1861.

In c.1865, he married Josephine Utz (aka Outz, and Qutz), a mulatto woman of German descent. Together they had six children, including Frederick "Fred" Douglass.

== Career ==
He initially worked at Dines and Simpson Carriage and Coach Makers Company, and learned blacksmithing. Charles Patterson later formed a partnership with James P. Lowe (J. P. Lowe), a white man, they created J.P. Lowe & Company in 1873.

In 1880, he served as a trustee of the Greenfield African Methodist Episcopal Church (Greenfield A.M.E. Church) and served as a Sunday school teacher. When his oldest son Fred was not allowed to attend the public high school due to racial segregation, Charles filed a court case, Patterson v. The Board of Education, in Highland County Court of Common Pleas with the help of Rev. James A. Shorter of his church. The verdict came in April 1887, and Patterson was allowed to attend the public school Greenfield High School.

In 1893, Charles Patterson bought out the remaining shares of the J. P. Lowe & Company and the name was changed to C.R. Patterson, Son & Company, to mark the inclusion of his son Samuel to the business. Samuel C. Patterson fell ill in 1897, and died in 1899. His eldest son Frederick Douglas Patterson moved home to help with the business. Patterson & Sons' features included winter and stormy weather usage and sliding side-door entry, the mounting rails uniquely located inside the carriage, protecting them from sleet, ice and the ensuing jams commonly experienced in competitive carriages. Their mounting rail technique was the precursor to the decades later technology used in vans and minivans.

After Charles R. Patterson's death on April 26, 1910, his son Frederick Douglas Patterson took over the carriage business and decided they needed to get into the "Patterson horseless carriage" business. In 1915 the Patterson-Greenfield automobile was introduced, though it withdrawn 3 years later, unable to compete with the larger automotive companies. In 1939 the Patterson company permanently closed.

In 2021 Charles Richard (C.R.) Patterson was posthumously inducted into the Automotive Hall of Fame for helping shape America's early automotive industry and in 2025 into the National Inventors Hall of Fame.
