= 1989–90 Marquette Warriors men's basketball team =

American college basketball season

1989–90 Marquette Warriors men's basketball

NIT, First Round L 54–57 vs. Penn State
- Conference: Midwestern Collegiate Conference
- Record: 15–14 (9–5 MW Coll)
- Head coach: Kevin O'Neill (1st season)
- Home arena: Bradley Center

1989–90 Midwestern Collegiate Conference men's basketball standings
	Conf.				Overall
Team	W		L	PCT	W		L	PCT
No. 25 Xavier	12	–	2	.857	28	–	5	.848
Dayton †	10	–	4	.714	22	–	10	.688
Saint Louis	9	–	5	.643	21	–	12	.636
Marquette	9	–	5	.643	15	–	14	.517
Evansville	8	–	6	.571	17	–	15	.531
Loyola (IL)	3	–	11	.214	7	–	22	.241
Detroit	3	–	11	.214	10	–	18	.357
Butler	2	–	12	.143	6	–	22	.214
† 1990 MCC tournament winner Rankings from AP

The 1989–90 Marquette Warriors men's basketball team represented Marquette University during the 1989–90 men's college basketball season. Their head coach was Kevin O'Neill. The Golden Eagles finished the regular season with a record of 15–14, 9—5. This was the first year in which Marquette played in the Midwestern Collegiate Conference.

Guard Tony Smith was the team's leading scorer with 689 points and 225 assists in 29 games. Other statistical leaders included Forward Trevor Powell with 158 rebounds.

== Roster ==
1989–90 Marquette Warriors men's basketball team
Players	Coaches
Pos. / # / Name / Height / Weight / Year / Hometown; G / 34 / Tony Smith / 6 ft 3 in (1.91 m) / 185 lb (84 kg) / Sr / Wauwatosa, Wisconsin	Head coach: Kevin O'Neill; Assistant coach(es) Legend: (C) Team captain; (S) Suspended; (I) Ineligible; (W) Walk-on; Injured; Current redshirt

== Schedule ==
Date time, TV	Rank^{#}	Opponent^{#}	Result	Record	Site city, state
November 24*		at Oregon State	W 57–51	0–1	Gill Coliseum (9,826); Corvallis, Oregon
December 1*		North Carolina-Wilmington	W 76–54	1–1	Bradley Center (11,593); Milwaukee, WI
December 2*		Wisconsin	L 58–63	1–2	Bradley Center (14,742); Milwaukee, WI
December 5		Loyola (IL)	W 73–69	2–2 (1–0)	Bradley Center (10,565); Milwaukee, WI
December 9*		Notre Dame	W 80–68	3–2 (1–0)	Bradley Center (14,012); Milwaukee, WI
December 16*		Michigan	L 73–82	3–3 (1–0)	Bradley Center (15,570); Milwaukee, WI
December 20*		Chicago State	W 77–45	4–3 (1–0)	Bradley Center (13,351); Milwaukee, WI
December 23*		at DePaul	L 62–71	4–4 (1–0)	Rosemont Horizon (9,210); Rosemont, Illinois
December 31*		Morgan State	W 75–51	5–4 (1–0)	Bradley Center (13,676); Milwaukee, WI
January 3*		Charleston Southern	W 83–57	6–4 (1–0)	Bradley Center (14,073); Milwaukee, WI
January 6		Xavier	L 80–86	6–5 (1–1)	Bradley Center (14,499); Milwaukee, WI
January 11		at Dayton	W 95–84	7–5 (2–1)	University of Dayton Arena (11,261); Dayton, Ohio
January 18		at Detroit	W 84–70	8–5 (3–1)	Calihan Hall (3,264); Detroit, Michigan
January 20*		DePaul	W 77–55	9–5 (3–1)	Bradley Center (16,761); Milwaukee, WI
January 22		Saint Louis	W 65–59	10–5 (4–1)	Bradley Center (11,331); Milwaukee, WI
January 27		at Evansville	L 66–70	10–6 (4–2)	Roberts Municipal Stadium (11,113); Evansville, Indiana
February 1		at Butler	W 75–73	11–6 (5–2)	Hinkle Fieldhouse (2,154); Indianapolis, Indiana
February 3*		Virginia	L 91–96	11–7 (5–2)	Bradley Center (12,823); Milwaukee, WI
February 8		at Xavier	L 78–83	11–8 (5–3)	Cincinnati Gardens (9,723); Cincinnati, Ohio
February 10		Dayton	L 77–79	11–9 (5–4)	Bradley Center (14,988); Milwaukee, WI
February 14*		at Notre Dame	L 76–79	11–10 (5–4)	Joyce Center (10,387); South Bend, Indiana
February 17		at Loyola (IL)	W 68–48	12–10 (6–4)	Rosemont Horizon (6,512); Rosemont, Illinois
February 19*		at Wisconsin	L 65–82	12–11 (6–4)	Wisconsin Field House (10,889); Madison, WI
February 24		at Saint Louis	L 55–65	12–12 (6–5)	Kiel Auditorium (9,169); St. Louis, Missouri
February 26		Evansville	W 90–65	13–12 (7–5)	Bradley Center (11,477); Milwaukee, WI
March 1		Detroit	W 70–69	14–12 (8–5)	Bradley Center (11,490); Milwaukee, WI
March 3		Butler	W 90–70	15–12 (9–5)	Bradley Center (12,142); Milwaukee, WI
March 8		vs. Saint Louis; Midwestern Collegiate Conference Tournament • Quarterfinal	L 57–66	15–13	University of Dayton Arena (10,100); Dayton, Ohio
March 14		at Penn State; NIT First round	L 54–57	15–14	Rec Hall (3,729); University Park, Pennsylvania
*Non-conference game. ^{#}Rankings from AP Poll. (#) Tournament seedings in parentheses.

== Team players drafted into the NBA ==
Round	Pick	Player	NBA club
2	51	Tony Smith	Los Angeles Lakers
