= 1989–90 Xavier Musketeers men's basketball team =

American college basketball season

1989–90 Xavier Musketeers men's basketball

MCC Regular season champions

NCAA tournament, Sweet Sixteen
- Conference: Midwestern Collegiate Conference

Ranking
- AP: No. 25
- Record: 28–5 (12–2 MCC)
- Head coach: Pete Gillen (5th season)
- Assistant coach: Dino Gaudio (3rd season)
- Home arena: Cincinnati Gardens

1989–90 Midwestern Collegiate Conference men's basketball standings
	Conf.				Overall
Team	W		L	PCT	W		L	PCT
No. 25 Xavier	12	–	2	.857	28	–	5	.848
Dayton †	10	–	4	.714	22	–	10	.688
Saint Louis	9	–	5	.643	21	–	12	.636
Marquette	9	–	5	.643	15	–	14	.517
Evansville	8	–	6	.571	17	–	15	.531
Loyola (IL)	3	–	11	.214	7	–	22	.241
Detroit	3	–	11	.214	10	–	18	.357
Butler	2	–	12	.143	6	–	22	.214
† 1990 MCC tournament winner Rankings from AP

The 1989–90 Xavier Musketeers men's basketball team represented Xavier University from Cincinnati, Ohio in the 1989–90 season. Led by head coach Pete Gillen, the Musketeers finished with a 28–5 record (12–2 MCC), won the MCC regular season title, and received an at-large bid to the NCAA tournament as the #6 seed in the Midwest region. In the NCAA tournament, the Musketeers defeated Kansas State and Georgetown to reach the Sweet Sixteen. Xavier lost to Texas in the Midwest regional semifinals – a game that was played in Dallas, Texas.

== Roster ==
1989–90 Xavier Musketeers men's basketball team
Players
Coaches

Pos.	#	Name	Height	Weight	Year	Hometown
G	10	Jamal Walker	5 ft 11 in (1.8 m)	—	Jr
G	22	Jamie Gladden	6 ft 0 in (1.83 m)	—	Fr
F	33	Derek Strong	6 ft 8 in (2.03 m)	215 lb (98 kg)	Jr	Los Angeles, California
F	42	Tyrone Hill	6 ft 9 in (2.06 m)	235 lb (107 kg)	Sr	Cincinnati, Ohio
F	44	Aaron Williams	6 ft 9 in (2.06 m)	210 lb (95 kg)	Fr	Rolling Meadows, Illinois

Head coach

- Pete Gillen (Fairfield)

Assistant coach(es)

Legend

- (C) Team captain
- (S) Suspended
- (I) Ineligible
- (W) Walk-on
- Injured
- Current redshirt

== Schedule and results ==
Date time, TV	Rank^{#}	Opponent^{#}	Result	Record	Site city, state
Regular season
Dec 2, 1989*		Southern Utah State	L 90–97	0–1	Cincinnati Gardens; Cincinnati, Ohio
Dec 4, 1989*		at Robert Morris	W 77–70	1–1	Charles L. Sewall Center; Moon Township, Pennsylvania
Dec 9, 1989*		at Miami (OH)	W 76–69	2–1	
Dec 16, 1989*		at Valparaiso	W 95–63	3–1	
Dec 18, 1989*		Eastern Illinois	W 80–48	5–1	Cincinnati Gardens; Cincinnati, Ohio
Dec 22, 1989*		vs. Princeton; Met Life Classic	W 72–65	6–1	War Memorial Gymnasium; San Francisco, California
Dec 23, 1989*		at San Francisco; Met Life Classic	W 78–62	7–1	War Memorial Gymnasium; San Francisco, California
Dec 30, 1989*		Bowling Green	W 88–73	8–1	Cincinnati Gardens; Cincinnati, Ohio
Jan 2, 1990*		No. 25 Loyola Marymount	W 115–113	9–1	Cincinnati Gardens; Cincinnati, Ohio
Jan 6, 1990		at Marquette	W 86–80	10–1 (1–0)	Bradley Center; Milwaukee, Wisconsin
Jan 8, 1990		Loyola (IL)	W 89–73	11–1 (2–0)	Cincinnati Gardens; Cincinnati, Ohio
Jan 13, 1990*	No. 25	Alabama–Birmingham	W 82–61	12–1	Cincinnati Gardens; Cincinnati, Ohio
Feb 27, 1990*	No. 19	at Arkansas–Little Rock	W 84–73	24–2	Barton Coliseum; Little Rock, Arkansas
Mar 3, 1990	No. 19	at Dayton	L 108–111	24–3 (12–2)	UD Arena; Dayton, Ohio
Midwestern Collegiate Conference Tournament
Mar 8, 1990*	No. 24	vs. Butler; MCC Tournament Quarterfinal	W 86–61	25–3	UD Arena; Dayton, Ohio
Mar 9, 1990*	No. 24	vs. Evansville; MCC Tournament Semifinal	W 89–78	26–3	UD Arena; Dayton, Ohio
Mar 10, 1990*	No. 24	at Dayton; MCC tournament championship	L 89–98	26–4	UD Arena; Dayton, Ohio
NCAA Tournament
Mar 16, 1990*	(6 MW) No. 25	vs. (11 MW) Kansas State; First round	W 87–79	27–4	RCA Dome; Indianapolis, Indiana
Mar 18, 1990*	(6 MW) No. 25	vs. (3 MW) No. 8 Georgetown; Second Round	W 74–71	28–4	RCA Dome; Indianapolis, Indiana
Mar 22, 1990*	(6 MW) No. 25	vs. (10 MW) Texas; Midwest Regional semifinal – Sweet Sixteen	L 89–102	28–5	Reunion Arena; Dallas, Texas
*Non-conference game. ^{#}Rankings from AP Poll. (#) Tournament seedings in parentheses. MW=Midwest. All times are in Eastern Time.

== NBA draft ==
Round	Pick	Player	NBA club
1	11	Tyrone Hill	Golden State Warriors
2	47	Derek Strong	Philadelphia 76ers
