= 1990 Midwestern Collegiate Conference men's basketball tournament =

- Classification: Division I
- Season: 1989–90
- Teams: 8
- Site: UD Arena; Dayton, Ohio
- Champions: Dayton (1st title)
- Winning coach: Jim O'Brien (1st title)
- MVP: Negele Knight (Dayton)

1989–90 Midwestern Collegiate Conference men's basketball standings
	Conf.				Overall
Team	W		L	PCT	W		L	PCT
No. 25 Xavier	12	–	2	.857	28	–	5	.848
Dayton †	10	–	4	.714	22	–	10	.688
Saint Louis	9	–	5	.643	21	–	12	.636
Marquette	9	–	5	.643	15	–	14	.517
Evansville	8	–	6	.571	17	–	15	.531
Loyola (IL)	3	–	11	.214	7	–	22	.241
Detroit	3	–	11	.214	10	–	18	.357
Butler	2	–	12	.143	6	–	22	.214
† 1990 MCC tournament winner Rankings from AP

The 1990 Midwestern Collegiate Conference men's basketball tournament (now known as the Horizon League men's basketball tournament) was held March 8–10 at UD Arena in Dayton, Ohio.

Dayton defeated Xavier in the championship game, 85–78. The win, on Dayton's home court, denied the Musketeers a fifth consecutive MCC/Horizon League men's basketball tournament title. It was Dayton's first MCC/Horizon League tourney title.

The Flyers received an automatic bid to the 1990 NCAA tournament as the #12 seed in the Midwest region. Xavier, the regular season conference champions, received an at-large bid as the #6 seed in the Midwest region.

== Format ==
All eight conference members participated in the tournament and were seeded based on regular season conference records.

== Bracket ==
Quarterfinals; Friday, March 8
1	#24 Xavier	86
8	Butler	61
4	Marquette	57
5	Evansville	66
3	Saint Louis	58
6	Loyola-Chicago	67
7	Detroit	72
2	Dayton	90

Semifinals; Saturday, March 9
1	#24 Xavier	89
5	Evansville	78
6	Loyola-Chicago	95
2	Dayton	97

Championship; Sunday, March 10
1	#24 Xavier	89
2	Dayton	98
