= Samuel Smith House and Tannery =

Historic house in Ohio, United States

- Samuel Smith House And Tannery
- U.S. National Register of Historic Places
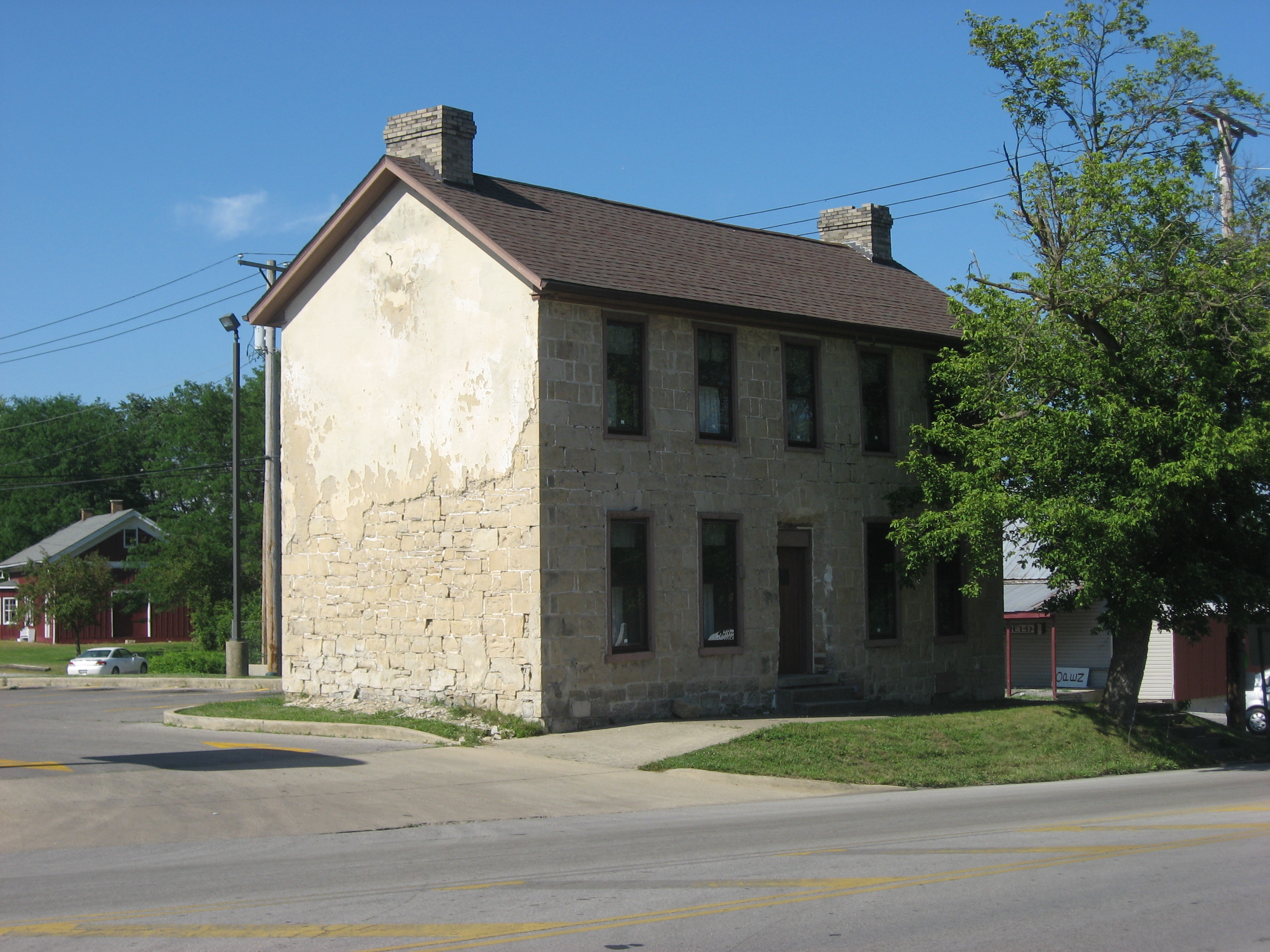
- Front and western side

- Location within Ohio Location within the United States
- Location: 103 Jefferson St., Greenfield, Ohio
- Coordinates: 39°21′9″N 83°22′45″W
- Area: Less than 1 acre (0.40 ha)
- Built: 1821
- Architect: William Robinson
- NRHP reference No.: 78002086
- Added to NRHP: July 5, 1978

The Samuel Smith House and Tannery is a historic residence in the village of Greenfield, Ohio, United States. Built in the 1820s, it has been named a historic site.

Greenfield was founded by American Revolution veteran William Robinson Smith, a native of Pennsylvania, in 1812. Smith and his son Robert founded a tannery on the settlement's eastern edge, along Paint Creek, and built a vernacular building to house the business. After several years of operation, the tannery was taken over by William's oldest son Samuel M., who arranged for the destruction of the original building and the construction of the present house in its stead. As the years passed, Samuel Smith became a prominent physician.

Built by Samuel Smith's cousin William Robinson, the Federal-style house-and-tannery was erected in 1821 and 1822. Constructed in the shape of an "L", the two-story house has walls that mix rubble masonry and ashlar, although the exterior is clad with stucco. The building rests on a stone foundation and is covered by an asphalt roof. Five bays wide with a door in the middle bay, it is one of Greenfield's oldest extant buildings.

In 1978, the Smith House was listed on the National Register of Historic Places, qualifying both because of its historically significant architecture and because of its place as the home of a leading community resident, Samuel M. Smith. It is one of two Greenfield buildings on the National Register, along with the Travellers' Rest Inn across the street.
