= Travellers' Rest Inn =

- U.S. National Register of Historic Places
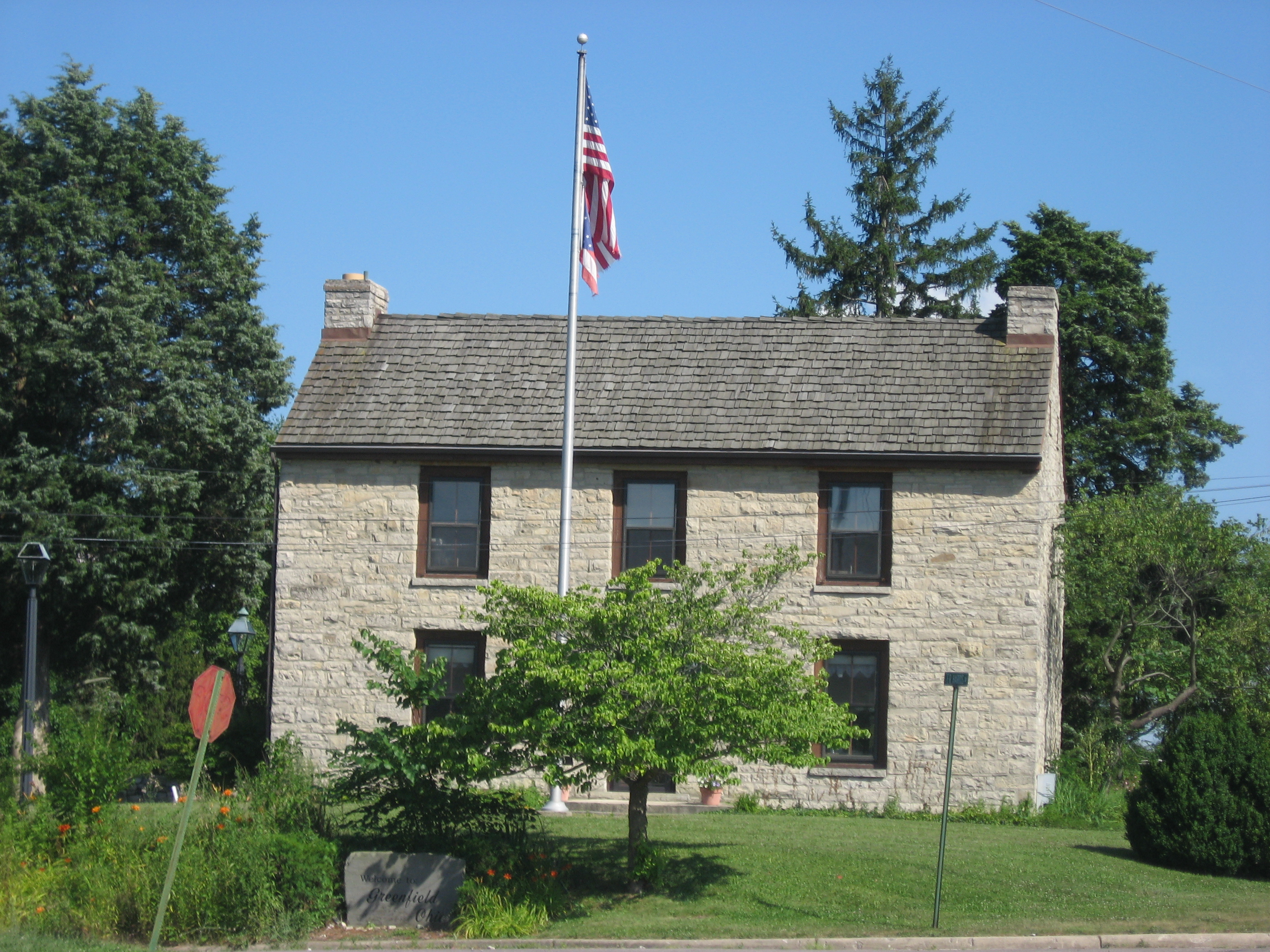
- Front of the inn

- Location within Ohio Location within the United States
- Location: Jefferson St. and McArthur Way, Greenfield, Ohio
- Coordinates: 39°21′7″N 83°22′43″W
- Area: Less than 1 acre (0.40 ha)
- Built: 1812
- NRHP reference No.: 79001864
- Added to NRHP: May 15, 1979

The Travellers' Rest Inn is a historic inn on the main street of Greenfield, Ohio, United States. Built in the early 19th century, it has been listed on the National Register of Historic Places because of its significance in local history.

When constructed in 1812, the Travellers' Rest Inn was Greenfield's first stone building. In its earliest years, the inn served travellers at long wooden tables in a large common room. Some arrived by stagecoach; others by boats on Paint Creek, a tributary of the Scioto River. One year after being established, the community's first post office also set up at the inn, under the supervision of Noble Crawford, who had overseen the inn's construction.

After Greenfield's first physician Garvin Johnson married Crawford's daughter, Johnson moved into the old inn, where he set up his doctor's office in part of it. The inn closed in 1829. The building was then used as a combined house and office by another Greenfield physician.

Two stories tall, the inn is covered with a shingled gabled roof; it is one bay wide on the sides and three wide on the front. The Greenfield Historical Society purchased it and moved it to its current location, placing it on a concrete foundation.

The Society operates the former inn as its headquarters and as one of several house museums. In 1979, the inn was listed on the National Register of Historic Places (NRHP), qualifying both because of its place in local history and because of its historically significant architecture. The Samuel Smith House and Tannery is also on the National Register.
