= Kevin O'Neill (basketball) =

American basketball coach (born 1957)

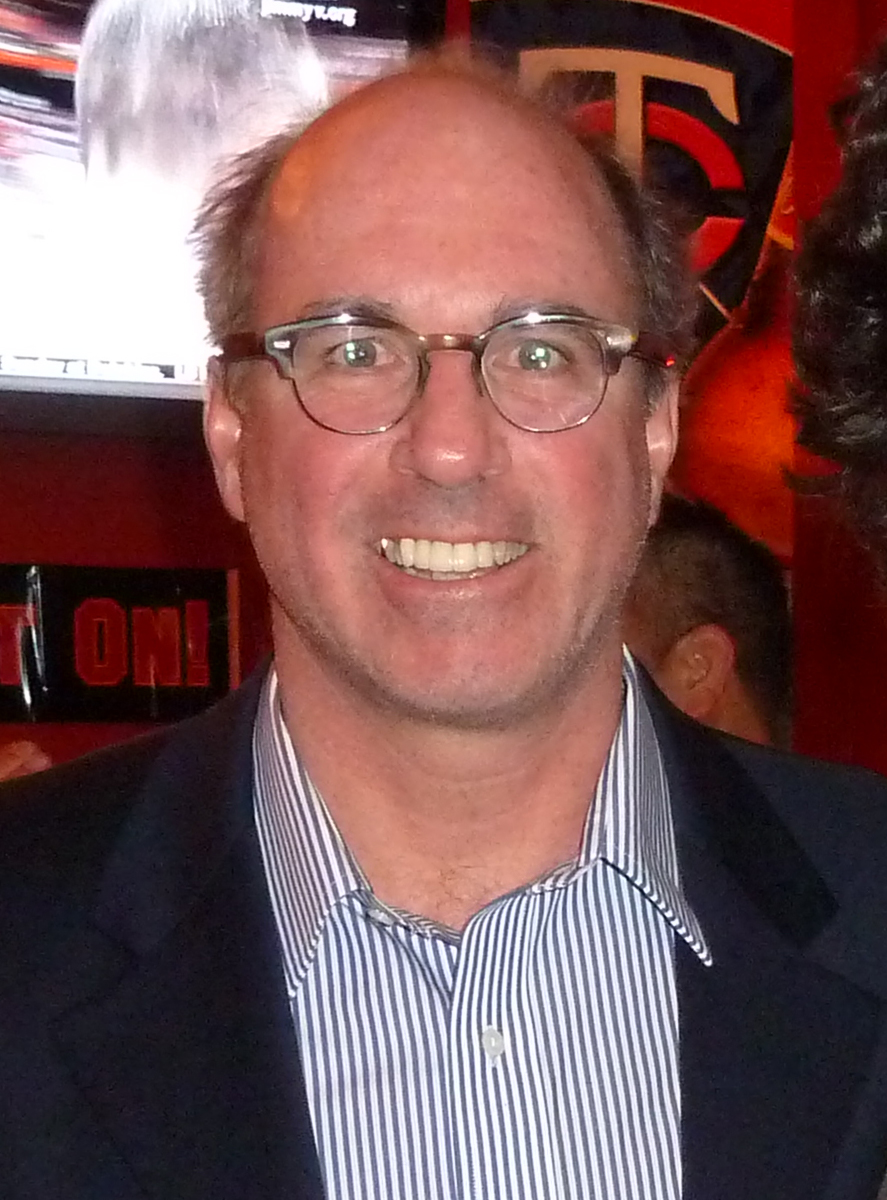
- O'Neill in 2011 while head coach of the USC Trojans

Biographical details
- Born: January 24, 1957 (age 69); Malone, New York, U.S.

Playing career
- 1976–1979: McGill

Coaching career (HC unless noted)
- 1979–1980: Hammond HS
- 1980–1982: North Country CC
- 1982–1983: Marycrest
- 1983–1985: Delaware (assistant)
- 1985–1986: Tulsa (assistant)
- 1986–1989: Arizona (assistant)
- 1989–1994: Marquette
- 1994–1997: Tennessee
- 1997–2000: Northwestern
- 2000–2001: New York Knicks (assistant)
- 2001–2003: Detroit Pistons (assistant)
- 2003–2004: Toronto Raptors
- 2004–2006: Indiana Pacers (assistant)
- 2007–2008: Arizona (interim HC)
- 2008–2009: Memphis Grizzlies (assistant)
- 2009–2013: USC

Head coaching record
- Overall: 215–241 (college); 33–49 (NBA)
- Tournaments: 2–4 (NCAA Division I); 0–3 (NIT)

Accomplishments and honors

Championships
- Great Midwest regular season (1994)

Awards
- 2× Great Midwest Coach of the Year (1993, 1994)

Kevin James O'Neill (born January 24, 1957) is an American basketball coach with experience as the head coach of various college and National Basketball Association (NBA) teams. Most recently he was the coach of the USC Trojans basketball team.

O'Neill was born in Malone, New York and attended McGill University in Montreal, Quebec, Canada. He lettered in basketball for three years in college, 1976–79, and in 1978 the McGill Redman had a school-record 28 win season and entered the Canadian Interuniversity Sport men's basketball championship tournament. He graduated from McGill in 1979 with a bachelor's degree in education, and later earned his master's degree in secondary education from Marycrest College in 1983, where he also served as head coach of the NAIA basketball team for the 1982–83 season.

== Early life ==
Born in Malone, New York, O'Neill grew up in nearby Chateaugay and graduated from Chateaugay Central School in 1975.

== Early coaching career ==
O'Neill's head coaching career began with tenures at North Country Community College (Saranac Lake, New York), Marycrest College (Davenport, Iowa), Marquette, Tennessee and Northwestern. During his tenure as the Northwestern coach O'Neill is most notably remembered for a game with Indiana where the rowdy Northwestern faithful chanted "Hoosier Daddy" (a play on "Who's Your Daddy?") at opposing coach Bob Knight. Of course this did not sit well with Knight as he and O'Neill got into it during the contest. However all was settled under a practice gym basket well after the game as ESPN camera crews caught the coaches talking their issues out. He would eventually become an assistant coach under Jeff Van Gundy with the New York Knicks. In 2001, he joined the Detroit Pistons under head coach Rick Carlisle.

== Marquette Warriors ==
As the head coach at Marquette, O'Neill led the Warriors to two 20+ win seasons, two NCAA tournament appearances; in 1993 the program's first appearance since 1983, and in 1994 its first Sweet 16 appearance since 1979 and a Great Midwest Conference Championship, the first conference championship in program history. O'Neill was featured in the 1994 Oscar-nominated documentary, Hoop Dreams.

== Toronto Raptors 2003–04 ==
The McGill University graduate returned to Canada in June 2003 as the head coach of the Toronto Raptors. His tenure was marked by inconsistency among his players, but the team was 25–25 after 50 games and in a position to return to the playoffs. However, injuries to key players resulted in the team going 8–24 to finish the season three games out of a playoff spot. On April 17, 2004, O'Neill was fired in the aftermath of a disappointing 2003–2004 season, after making some remarks which were taken to question the team's commitment to winning.

== Indiana Pacers ==
In the 2004–2005 season he was hired as an assistant coach with the Indiana Pacers where he rejoined head coach Rick Carlisle.

== Arizona Wildcats 2007–08 ==
On May 1, 2007, it was announced that O'Neill would replace Jim Rosborough as the assistant coach to Hall of Famer Lute Olson at the University of Arizona. O'Neill was an assistant under Olson during Arizona's rise to national prominence in the 1980s, and used it as a launching board to attain his first major head coaching position at Marquette.

On November 4, 2007, Olson announced that he was taking an "indefinite leave of absence", and that O'Neill would assume Olson's head coaching duties in his absence. On December 6 Olson released a statement stating that he would be extending his leave of absence for the remainder of the season. He cited personal family reasons that required his immediate attention; the next day, his attorney revealed that Olson had filed for divorce from his second wife. The same day it was announced that O'Neill would remain the interim head coach for the rest of the season.

Later the same month, on December 18, Arizona athletic director Jim Livengood announced O'Neill as the designated successor to Olson. Olson said at the time he planned to return for the 2008–09 season; Livengood stated that O'Neill would succeed Olson upon his retirement. In March 2008, Olson confirmed that he would return as head coach for the 2008–2009 season, and said that he planned to coach until his contract ended in 2011. With the announcement of Olson's return, the O'Neill succession plan was thrown into question amidst media rumors of disagreement between Olson and O'Neill.

Only a month later, Lute Olson announced that O'Neill would not be retained on the University of Arizona staff. After spending the spring and summer preparing for the upcoming season, Olson abruptly and unexpectedly announced his permanent retirement from the Arizona basketball program in October 2008; his personal physician cited health concerns as the reason.

== Memphis Grizzlies 2008–09 ==
In May 2008, O'Neill was hired as an assistant coach & special assistant to the GM for the Memphis Grizzlies.

== USC Trojans 2009–2013 ==
On June 20, 2009, O'Neill was named head coach of the USC men's basketball team.

O'Neill along with noted USC booster Nik Visger were involved in an altercation with an Arizona Wildcats booster at his hotel on March 10, 2011. As a result, O'Neill was suspended for the rest of the Pac-10 tournament, which resulted in a 67–62 loss for the Trojans.

O'Neill's 2012–2013 entered the season with high hopes based around a number of transfers coming in from other programs. The team started the season 3–6, fueling speculation that it would be O'Neill's last at USC. Much of this speculation was due to the fact that O'Neill sold his Los Angeles home, and relocated to Coronado, CA, which is located over 125 miles away from USC.

On January 14, 2013 Pat Haden, USC Athletic Director, announced that O'Neill had been relieved of his duties at the university after beginning the season 7–10 (2–2 Pac-12).

== Broadcasting career ==
In October 2013, O'Neill joined Fox Sports as a college basketball analyst.

== Head coaching record ==
=== College ===
Record table
Season	Team	Overall	Conference	Standing	Postseason
Marquette Warriors (Midwestern Collegiate Conference) (1989–1991)
1989–90	Marquette	15–14	9–5	T–3rd	NIT First Round
1990–91	Marquette	11–18	7–7	T–5th	
Marquette Warriors (Great Midwest Conference) (1991–1994)
1991–92	Marquette	16–13	5–5	T–3rd	
1992–93	Marquette	20–8	6–4	3rd	NCAA Division I First Round
1993–94	Marquette	24–9	10–2	1st	NCAA Division I Sweet 16
Marquette:		86–62 (.581)	37–23 (.617)		
Tennessee Volunteers (Southeastern Conference) (1994–1997)
1994–95	Tennessee	11–16	4–12	6th	
1995–96	Tennessee	14–15	6–10	T–5th	NIT First Round
1996–97	Tennessee	11–16	4–12	6th	
Tennessee:		36–47 (.434)	14–24 (.368)		
Northwestern Wildcats (Big Ten Conference) (1997–2000)
1997–98	Northwestern	10–17	3–13	T–9th	
1998–99	Northwestern	15–14	6–10	8th	NIT First Round
1999–00	Northwestern	5–25	0–16	11th	
Northwestern:		30–56 (.349)	9–39 (.188)		
Arizona Wildcats (Pacific-10 Conference) (2007–2008)
2007–08	Arizona	19–15*	8–10	7th	NCAA Division I First Round
Arizona:		0–14** (.000)	0–0 (–)		
USC Trojans (Pacific-10/Pac-12 Conference) (2009–2013)
2009–10	USC	16–14	8–10	5th	
2010–11	USC	19–15	10–8	T–4th	NCAA Division I First Four
2011–12	USC	6–26	1–17	12th	
2012–13	USC	7–10	2–2		
USC:		45–61 (.425)	19–35 (.352)		
Total:		197–240*** (.451)			
National champion Postseason invitational champion Conference regular season champion Conference regular season and conference tournament champion Division regular season champion Division regular season and conference tournament champion Conference tournament champion

* All 19 wins and 1 tournament loss from 2007–08 season was later vacated ** Final record at Arizona after vacated wins *** Takes into account vacated wins at Arizona

=== NBA ===
Legend
Regular season	G	Games coached	W	Games won	L	Games lost	W–L %	Win–loss %
Playoffs	PG	Playoff games	PW	Playoff wins	PL	Playoff losses	PW–L %	Playoff win–loss %

Team	Year	G	W	L	W–L%	Finish	PG	PW	PL	PW–L%	Result
Toronto	2003–04	82	33	49	.402	6th in Central	—	—	—	—	Missed Playoffs
Career		82	33	49	.402		—	—	—	—	
