= Greenfield, Ohio =

- Village
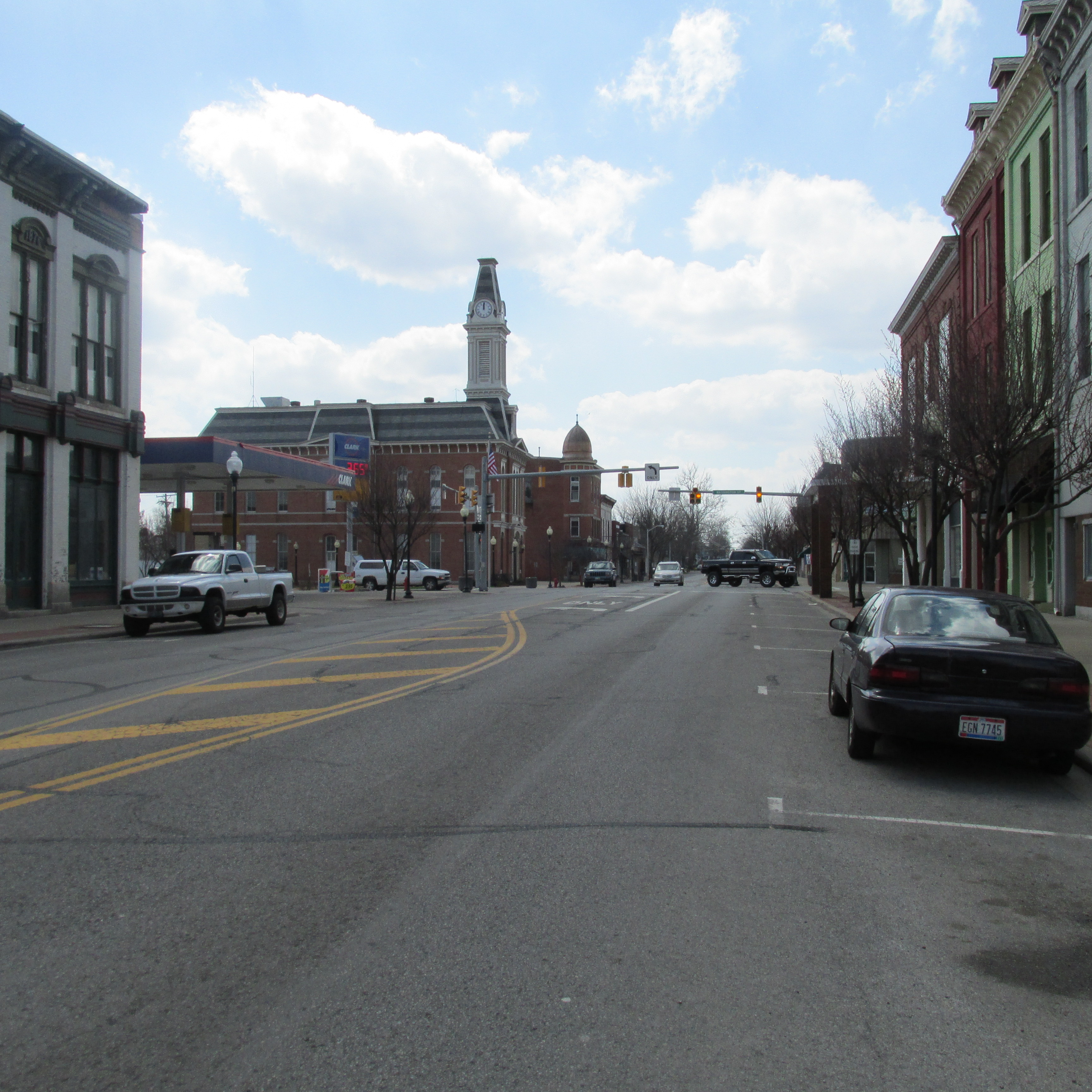
- Intersection of Jefferson Street and Washington Street (central business district) in Greenfield
- Motto: "A Perfect Place To Raise A Family"
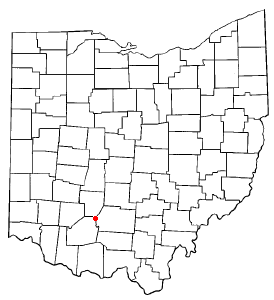
- Location of Greenfield, Ohio

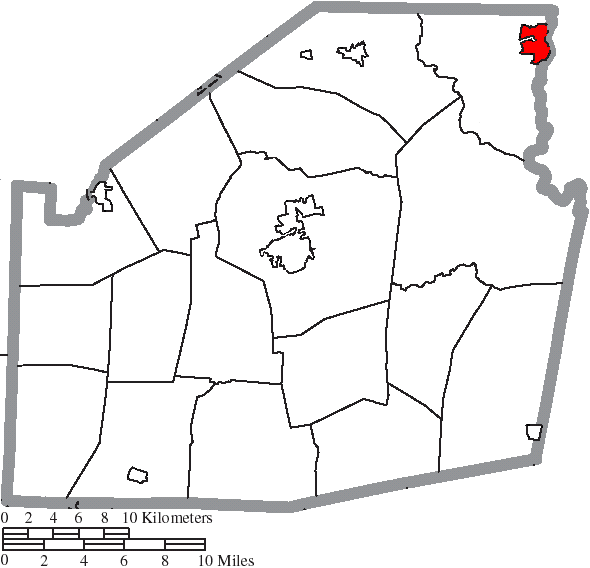
- Location of Greenfield in Highland County
- Coordinates: 39°21′00″N 83°22′45″W
- Country: United States
- State: Ohio
- Counties: Highland, Ross

Government
  - Type: Mayor-council government
  - Mayor: Chris Borreson

Area
  - Total: 2.08 sq mi (5.40 km^{2})
  - Land: 2.08 sq mi (5.40 km^{2})
  - Water: 0 sq mi (0.00 km^{2})
- Elevation: 925 ft (282 m)

Population (2020)
  - Total: 4,339
  - Estimate (2023): 4,336
  - Density: 2,080.5/sq mi (803.27/km^{2})
- Time zone: UTC-5 (Eastern (EST))
  - Summer (DST): UTC-4 (EDT)
- Postal code: 45123
- Area codes: 937, 326
- FIPS code: 39-32088
- GNIS feature ID: 2394985
- Website: greenfieldohio.net

Greenfield is a village in Highland and Ross counties, Ohio, United States. As of the 2020 census, the population was 4,339. Greenfield is also home to the Greenfield Exempted Village School District.

== History ==
Greenfield was named for its rural appearance, and was founded by General Duncan McArthur in 1799.

Most of Greenfield's early settlers moved to Ohio to work in anti-slavery efforts. In April 1833, the Abolition Society of Paint Valley was founded. Its main effort was to educate and do missionary work in the stance of ending slavery. The Abolition Society of Paint Valley was later disbanded but was quickly re-organized as the Greenfield Antislavery Society. Records become thin due to the large number of citizens helping African Americans to gain freedom. Greenfield played a major part in the ending of slavery. Former slaves passed through the area on their way to Canada during the operation of the Underground Railroad with much help from Greenfield's community members.

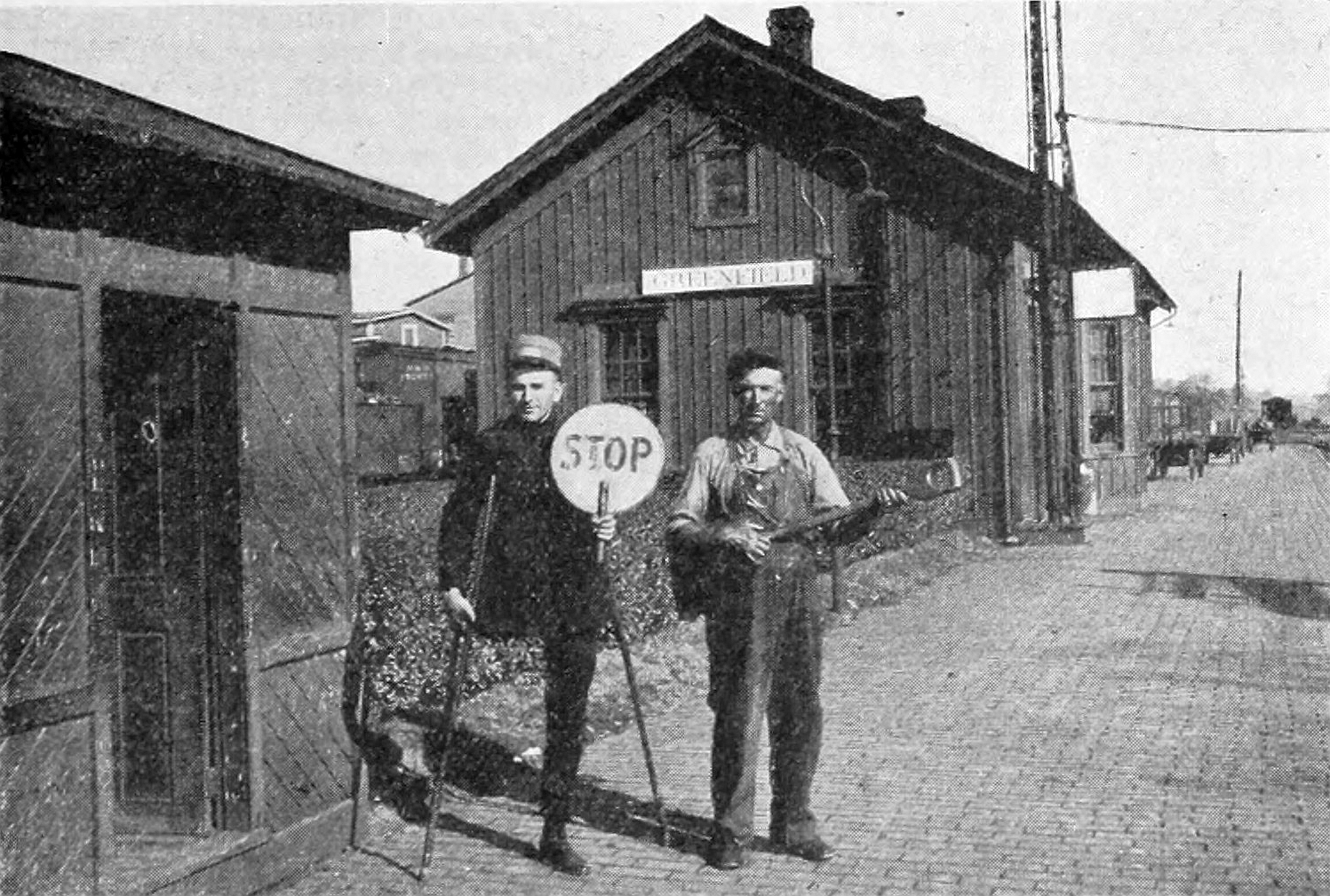
The crossing watchman and the coal shoveler at the Baltimore and Ohio Railroad depot in Greenfield, 1920

In 1893, the first African American owned car company was first founded in Greenfield. The C.R. Patterson and Sons company started as a horse-drawn buggy company but later produced cars, buses, and trucks. C.R. Patterson, alongside J.P. Lowe, moved to Greenfield where they founded the car company. The C.R. Patterson and Sons car company provided Greenfield schools buses to conduct routes. Other industries in Greenfield include Ruckers Quarry, which day and night quarried stone such as limestone on a large scale for the Cincinnati market. Another industry was Harps Manufacturing which was most well known for the Never-fail Oil Can, which was originally designed by Eugene Arnott but then perfected by Harp's Manufacturing.

Edward Lee McClain High School opened on September 23, 1915. People who wished to attend paid a fee of 15 cents for admission. It was the first school in Ohio to have an indoor swimming pool, which is still there today, with minor construction revisions.

In 1988, the 29.5-mile railroad line connecting the city to the national rail network was scheduled to be decommissioned, but Greenfield bought it for $2.4 million and kept it operational in order to retain a transportation outlet for the local manufacturing industry. This also made the city the smallest in the U.S. to own its own rail line.

=== Historic sites ===
Much of Greenfield's early history concentrates on the Travellers' Rest Inn at the eastern end of Jefferson Street. Constructed in 1812, it was the village's first stone building. It also served as its first post office, and was the space for its first doctor's office. Now operated as a museum, the inn is listed on the National Register of Historic Places. The Samuel Smith House and Tannery is also listed on the National Register.

== Geography ==
Greenfield is located almost entirely in Highland County.

According to the United States Census Bureau, the city has a total area of 2.06 square miles (5.34 km^{2}), all land.

=== Climate ===
Greenfield receives an annual average of 38 inches of rain, and averages 25 inches of snow. Both averages are very similar to those of the United States. Greenfield averages 173 sunny days and 128 rainy days. The average high temperature in July is 84 degrees and the average low in January is 20.6 degrees.

== Demographics ==
Historical population
Census	Pop.	Note	%±
1850	1,011		—
1860	1,500		48.4%
1870	1,712		14.1%
1880	2,104		22.9%
1890	2,460		16.9%
1900	3,979		61.7%
1910	4,228		6.3%
1920	4,344		2.7%
1930	3,871		−10.9%
1940	4,228		9.2%
1950	4,862		15.0%
1960	5,422		11.5%
1970	4,780		−11.8%
1980	5,150		7.7%
1990	5,172		0.4%
2000	4,906		−5.1%
2010	4,639		−5.4%
2020	4,339		−6.5%
2023 (est.)	4,336	▼	−0.1%
U.S. Decennial Census

=== 2020 census ===
As of the 2020 census, Greenfield had a population of 4,339. The median age was 39.9 years. 24.4% of residents were under the age of 18 and 19.2% of residents were 65 years of age or older. For every 100 females there were 87.7 males, and for every 100 females age 18 and over there were 87.3 males age 18 and over.

97.3% of residents lived in urban areas, while 2.7% lived in rural areas.

There were 1,784 households in Greenfield, of which 28.9% had children under the age of 18 living in them. Of all households, 31.4% were married-couple households, 21.4% were households with a male householder and no spouse or partner present, and 34.4% were households with a female householder and no spouse or partner present. About 35.6% of all households were made up of individuals and 17.0% had someone living alone who was 65 years of age or older.

There were 2,049 housing units, of which 12.9% were vacant. The homeowner vacancy rate was 3.3% and the rental vacancy rate was 6.4%.

Racial composition as of the 2020 census
Race	Number	Percent
White	4,021	92.7%
Black or African American	85	2.0%
American Indian and Alaska Native	9	0.2%
Asian	13	0.3%
Native Hawaiian and Other Pacific Islander	3	0.1%
Some other race	17	0.4%
Two or more races	191	4.4%
Hispanic or Latino (of any race)	29	0.7%

=== 2010 census ===
As of the census of 2010, there were 4,639 people, 1,829 households, and 1,148 families residing in the city. The population density was 2,251.9 inhabitants per square mile (869.5/km^{2}). There were 2,141 housing units at an average density of 1,039.3 per square mile (401.3/km^{2}). The racial makeup of the city was 95.9% White, 1.7% African American, 0.1% Native American, 0.2% Asian, 0.3% from other races, and 1.7% from two or more races. Hispanic or Latino people of any race were 0.8% of the population.

There were 1,829 households, of which 33.7% had children under the age of 18 living with them, 38.4% were married couples living together, 17.8% had a female householder with no husband present, 6.5% had a male householder with no wife present, and 37.2% were non-families. 32.1% of all households were made up of individuals, and 15% had someone living alone who was 65 years of age or older. The average household size was 2.47 and the average family size was 3.07.

The median age in the city was 37.1 years. 25.9% of residents were under the age of 18; 8.7% were between the ages of 18 and 24; 25.3% were from 25 to 44; 24.4% were from 45 to 64; and 15.8% were 65 years of age or older. The gender makeup of the city was 47.5% male and 52.5% female.

=== 2000 census ===
As of the census of 2000, there were 4,906 people, 1,955 households, and 1,253 families residing in the village. The population density was 2,536.3 inhabitants per square mile (979.3/km^{2}). There were 2,099 housing units at an average density of 1,085.1 per square mile (419.0/km^{2}). The racial makeup of the village was 95.78% White, 2.20% African American, 0.08% Native American, 1.28% Asian, 0.12% Pacific Islander, 0.33% from other races, and 1.41% from two or more races. Hispanic or Latino people of any race were 0.69% of the population.

There were 1,955 households, out of which 31.4% had children under the age of 18 living with them, 44.3% were married couples living together, 15.3% had a female householder with no husband present, and 35.9% were non-families. 30.9% of all households were made up of individuals, and 15.4% had someone living alone who was 65 years of age or older. The average household size was 2.44 and the average family size was 3.04.

In the village, the population was spread out, with 26.4% under the age of 18, 9.6% from 18 to 24, 26.2% from 25 to 44, 21.3% from 45 to 64, and 16.6% who were 65 years of age or older. The median age was 36 years. For every 100 females, there were 85.6 males. For every 100 females age 18 and over, there were 81.8 males.

The median income for a household in the village was $30,805, and the median income for a family was $36,952. Males had a median income of $32,156 versus $21,352 for females. The per capita income for the village was $14,306. About 12.3% of families and 15.1% of the population were below the poverty line, including 16.5% of those under age 18 and 13.6% of those age 65 or over.

== Government ==
The Village of Greenfield is a village in the state of Ohio which uses the mayor-council system of government. The current mayor is Chris Borreson, who was elected on November 4, 2025, and was sworn into office on January 1, 2026.

Other officials include Fiscal Officer Carolyn Snodgrass, Director of Public Service and Safety Racheal Crabtree, Chief of Police Jeremiah Oyer, Finance Clerk Sunny Taylor, and Clerk of Council Katherine Blumenberg.

== Education ==
Greenfield Exempted Village Schools operates three elementary schools (Rainsboro, Buckskin, and Greenfield Elementary), one middle school, and McClain High School.

Greenfield has a public library, a branch of the Highland County District Library.

== Notable people ==
- Samuel McChord Crothers, essayist and Unitarian divine
- Otway Curry, poet and legislator
- David T. Daniels, Director of the Ohio Department of Agriculture
- Don Grate, professional baseball and basketball player
- Noble Edward Irwin, United States Navy rear admiral
- Wenona Marlin, suffragist
- Brad Martin, country music artist
- David Noggle, jurist
- Charles Richard Patterson, African-American carriage manufacturer and civil rights activist.
- Frederick Patterson, the first African-American automobile manufacturer
- Johnny Paycheck, country singer

== Gallery ==
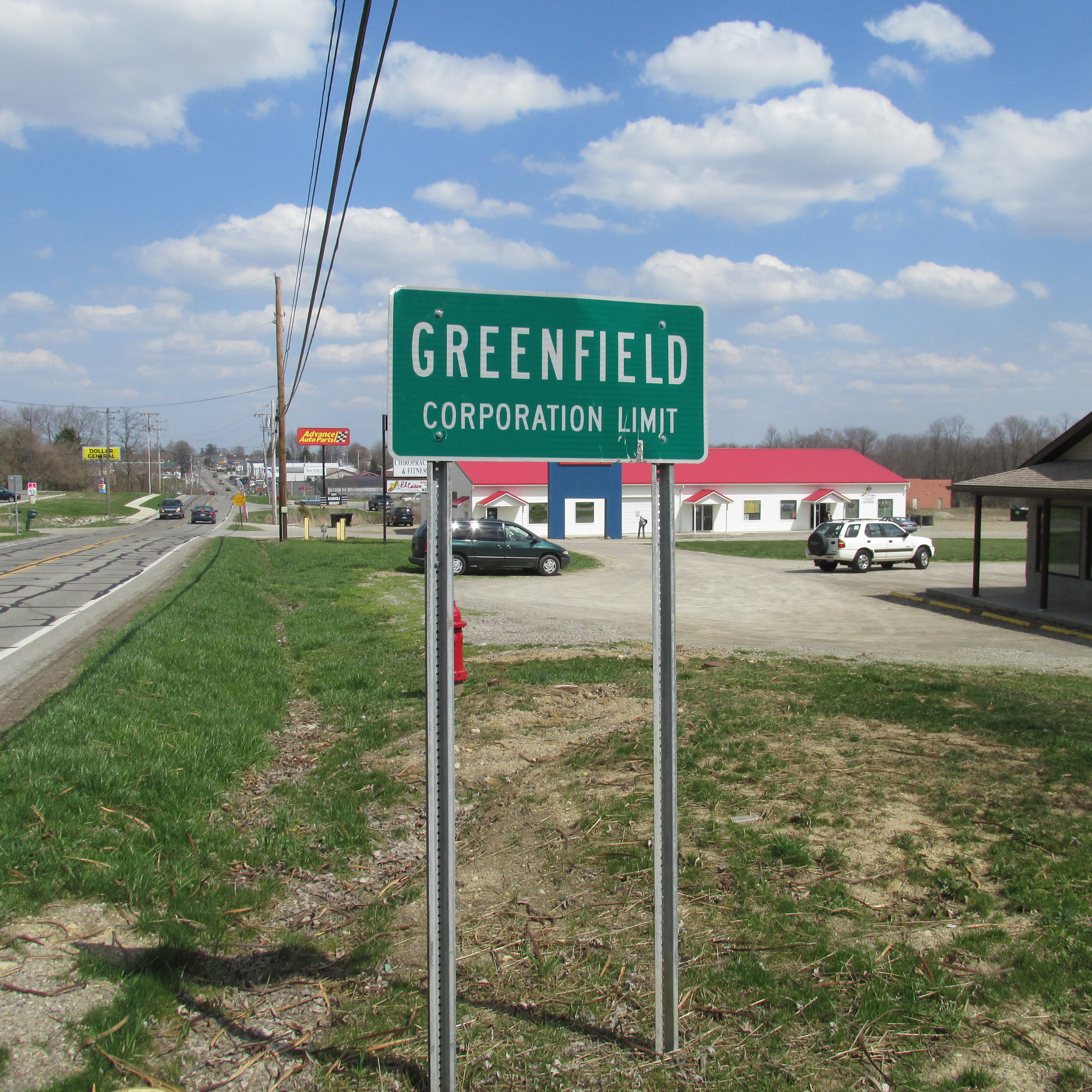
Greenfield corporation limit sign

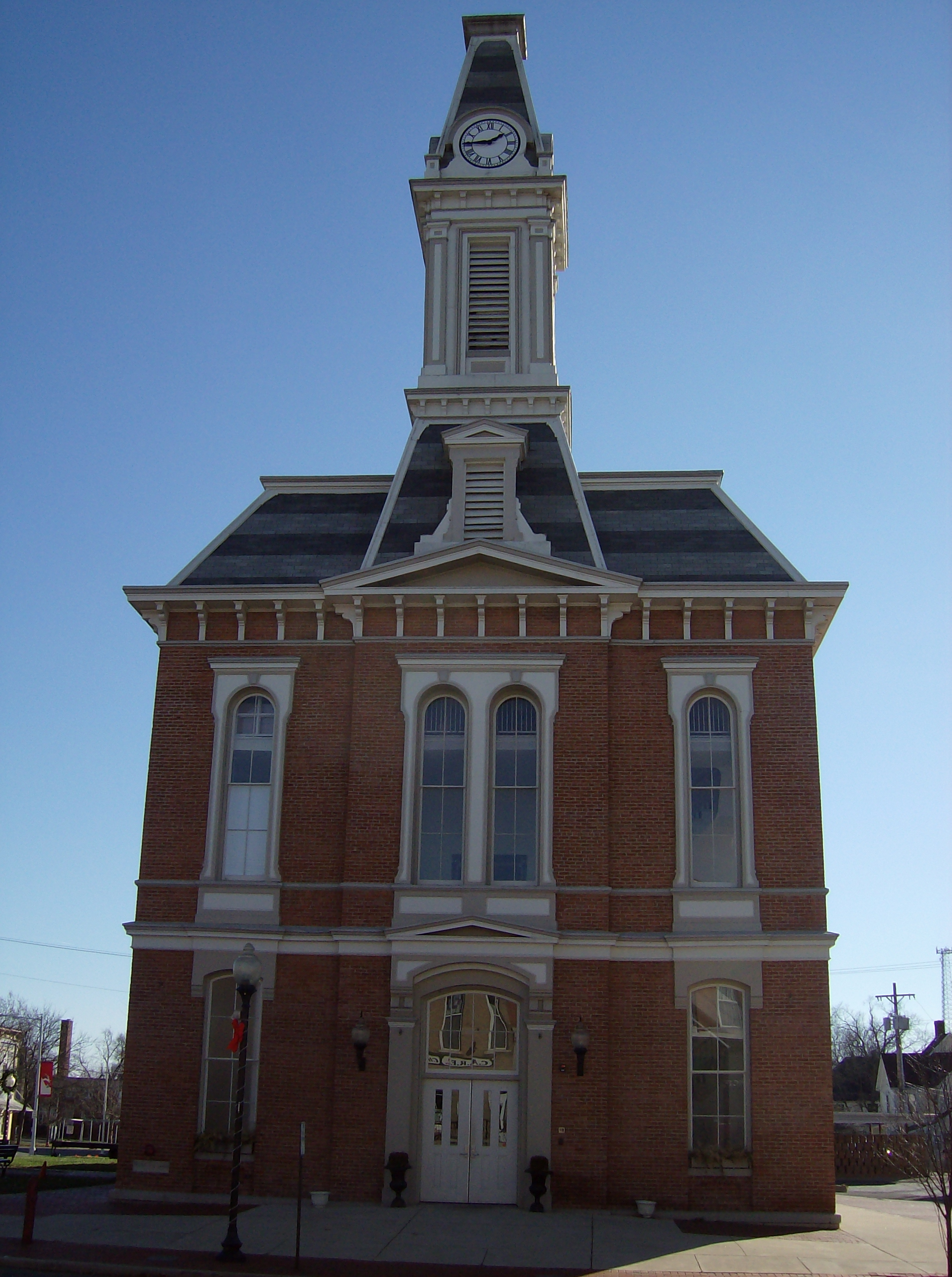
Clock tower in central Greenfield
