= Negele Knight =

American basketball player (born 1967)

Personal information
- Born: March 6, 1967 (age 59) Detroit, Michigan, U.S.
- Listed height: 6 ft 1 in (1.85 m)
- Listed weight: 175 lb (79 kg)

Career information
- High school: Saint Martin de Porres (Detroit, Michigan)
- College: Dayton (1985–1990)
- NBA draft: 1990: 2nd round, 31st overall pick
- Drafted by: Phoenix Suns
- Playing career: 1990–2002
- Position: Point guard
- Number: 32, 11

Career history
- 1990–1993: Phoenix Suns
- 1993–1994: San Antonio Spurs
- 1994: Portland Trail Blazers
- 1994–1995: Detroit Pistons
- 1998: SAV Vacallo
- 1998–1999: Olympique Antibes
- 1999: Toronto Raptors
- 2001–2002: Phoenix Eclipse

Career highlights
- First-team All-MCC (1990); MCC tournament MVP (1990)

Career NBA statistics
- Points: 1,699 (6.2 ppg)
- Assists: 780 (2.8 apg)
- Stats at NBA.com
- Stats at Basketball Reference

Negele Oscar Knight (born March 6, 1967) is an American former professional basketball player who played six National Basketball Association (NBA) seasons for the Phoenix Suns, San Antonio Spurs, Portland Trail Blazers, Detroit Pistons and Toronto Raptors. Knight was selected by the Suns in the second round (31st pick overall) of the 1990 NBA draft. Knight's best year as a professional came during the 1993–94 season as a member of the Spurs, when he appeared in 64 games averaging 9.3 ppg. He played collegiately at the University of Dayton.

== College career ==
In 1990, Knight was named the tournament MVP after Dayton defeated Xavier 98–89 to clinch an NCAA tournament berth. Knight then scored 27 points in the first round of the 1990 NCAA Division I men's basketball tournament as Dayton team upset the higher-seeded Illinois Fighting Illini 88–86. He is a member of the Dayton All-Century team.

== Professional career ==
Knight's trade from the Suns to the Spurs during the 1993 NBA offseason caused the Houston Rockets to complain publicly about the trade. Knight would end up as a starter for the Spurs in 1993–94.
