= Don Grate =

American baseball and basketball player (1923–2014)

- Pitcher
- Born: August 27, 1923; Greenfield, Ohio, U.S.
- Died: November 22, 2014 (aged 91); Miami Gardens, Florida, U.S.
- Batted: Right Threw: Right

MLB debut
- July 6, 1945, for the Philadelphia Phillies

Last MLB appearance
- September 28, 1946, for the Philadelphia Phillies

MLB statistics
- Win–loss record: 1–1
- Earned run average: 9.37
- Innings pitched: 16 1/3
- Stats at Baseball Reference

Teams
- Philadelphia Phillies (1945–1946)

Donald Grate (August 27, 1923 – November 22, 2014) was an American professional baseball and basketball player. He played both Major League Baseball as a right-handed pitcher for the Philadelphia Phillies (seven games pitched over two seasons, 1945–1946) and NBA basketball as a small forward/shooting guard for the Sheboygan Redskins (two games played during the 1949–1950 season). Grate was listed at 6 feet 2 inches (1.88 m) tall and 180 pounds (82 kg).

== College career ==
Born in Greenfield, Ohio and nicknamed "Buckeye", Grate was a two-sport star at the Ohio State University, lettering in both baseball and basketball in the 1944 and 1945 seasons. As a pitcher, he had career totals of 95 strikeouts and only 25 walks in just 89 innings pitched. In basketball Grate was a two-time all-Big Ten selection and earned All-America honors as a senior after scoring 272 points in 21 games. He was the captain of the 1944 team, leading the Buckeyes to a conference championship. Grate was inducted into the Ohio State Varsity O Hall of Fame in 1996.

== Professional baseball ==
In baseball Grate was known for his throwing arm, including throwing the ball 445 ft 1 in (135.66 m). He appeared with the Phillies during each of his first two pro seasons, splitting both 1945 and 1946 between the Phils and their Class A Eastern League farm club, the Utica Blue Sox. He was treated very roughly during his 1945 trial with Philadelphia, surrendering 16 runs, all earned, 18 hits, and 12 walks in 8 1/3 innings pitched over four appearances. He won 14 games for Utica in 1946, prompting a September call-up to the Majors, during which he was far more effective. He pitched three shutout innings of relief during his first two appearances, and was credited with his only MLB win on September 22 against the New York Giants at Shibe Park. In his final big-league game, six days later, he allowed only one run in five innings pitched, also against the Giants. In seven MLB games and 16 1/3 innings pitched, all in relief, Grate allowed 22 hits, 17 earned runs, and 14 bases on balls, with eight strikeouts. He had a long minor league career, playing for 13 seasons (1945–1957), winning 50 of 88 decisions as a pitcher and converting to an outfielder and third baseman in 1951 to take advantage of his skill as a hitter. He batted over .300 several times.

== Professional basketball ==
In addition to his time playing baseball, Grate had also spent some time playing for the Indianapolis Kautskys for the National Basketball League. Grate later appeared in two games for the 1949–1950 Sheboygan Red Skins in the NBA, with one field goal and two points in six attempted shots.

== Career statistics ==
Legend
| GP | Games played | GS | Games started | MPG | Minutes per game |
| FG% | Field goal percentage | 3P% | 3-point field goal percentage | FT% | Free throw percentage |
| RPG | Rebounds per game | APG | Assists per game | SPG | Steals per game |
| BPG | Blocks per game | PPG | Points per game | **Bold** | Career high |

=== NBA ===
==== Regular season ====
| Year | Team | GP | FG% | FT% | APG | PPG |
|---|---|---|---|---|---|---|
| 1949–50 | Sheboygan | 2 | .167 | 1.000 | 1.5 | 2.0 |
