= Missouri State Bears basketball statistical leaders =

The Missouri State Bears basketball statistical leaders are individual statistical leaders of the Missouri State Bears basketball program in various categories, including points, assists, blocks, rebounds, and steals. Within those areas, the lists identify single-game, single-season, and career leaders. The Bears represent the Missouri State University in the NCAA's Missouri Valley Conference.

Missouri State began competing in intercollegiate basketball in 1908. However, the school's record book does not generally list records from before the 1950s, as records from before this period are often incomplete and inconsistent. Since scoring was much lower in this era, and teams played much fewer games during a typical season, it is likely that few or no players from this era would appear on these lists anyway.

The NCAA did not officially record assists as a stat until the 1983–84 season, and blocks and steals until the 1985–86 season, but Missouri State's record books includes players in these stats before these seasons. These lists are updated through the end of the 2020–21 season.

== Scoring ==
Career
| Rk | Player | Points | Seasons |
|---|---|---|---|
| 1 | Daryel Garrison | 1975 | 1971–72 1972–73 1973–74 1974–75 |
| 2 | Kyle Weems | 1868 | 2008–09 2009–10 2010–11 2011–12 |
| 3 | Curtis Perry | 1835 | 1966–67 1967–68 1968–69 1969–70 |
| 4 | Johnny Murdock | 1834 | 1991–92 1992–93 1993–94 1994–95 |
| 5 | Danny Bolden | 1718 | 1963–64 1964–65 1965–66 1966–67 |
| 6 | Danny Moore | 1691 | 1996–97 1997–98 1998–99 |
| 7 | Chuck Williams | 1687 | 1967–68 1968–69 1969–70 1970–71 |
| 8 | Blake Ahearn | 1677 | 2003–04 2004–05 2005–06 2006–07 |
| 9 | Jimmie Dull | 1532 | 1974–75 1975–76 1976–77 1977–78 |
| 10 | Kevin Ault | 1508 | 1996–97 1997–98 1998–99 1999–00 |

Season
| Rk | Player | Points | Season |
|---|---|---|---|
| 1 | Winston Garland | 720 | 1986–87 |
| 2 | Isiaih Mosley | 692 | 2021–22 |
| 3 | Curtis Perry | 684 | 1969–70 |
| 4 | Danny Moore | 645 | 1996–97 |
| 5 | Mike Robinson | 630 | 1979–80 |
| 6 | Daryel Garrison | 617 | 1973–74 |
| | Jimmie Dull | 617 | 1977–78 |
| 8 | Zack Townsend | 589 | 1971–72 |
| 9 | Keith Palek III | 587 | 2025–26 |
| 10 | Daryel Garrison | 578 | 1974–75 |

Single game
| Rk | Player | Points | Season | Opponent |
|---|---|---|---|---|
| 1 | Jimmie Dull | 53 | 1976–77 | Kentucky Wesleyan |
| 2 | Jimmie Dull | 44 | 1976–77 | Southeast Missouri |
| 3 | Isiaih Mosley | 43 | 2021–22 | Northern Iowa |
| 4 | Daryel Garrison | 41 | 1974–75 | Central Missouri |
| 5 | Isiaih Mosley | 40 | 2021–22 | Loyola (Chicago) |
| 6 | Don Anielak | 39 | 1952–53 | Truman State |
| | Curtis Perry | 39 | 1969–70 | Southeast Missouri |
| | Mike Robinson | 39 | 1978–79 | Missouri S&T |
| 9 | Don Anielak | 38 | 1952–53 | Central Missouri |
| | Curtis Perry | 38 | 1969–70 | Southeast Missouri |
| | Curtis Perry | 38 | 1969–70 | Missouri S&T |
| | Daryel Garrison | 38 | 1974–75 | Central Missouri |
| | Marcus Marshall | 38 | 2014–15 | Eastern Illinois |

== Rebounds ==
Career
| Rk | Player | Rebounds | Seasons |
|---|---|---|---|
| 1 | Curtis Perry | 1424 | 1966–67 1967–68 1968–69 1969–70 |
| 2 | Danny Bolden | 1133 | 1963–64 1964–65 1965–66 1966–67 |
| 3 | William Doolittle | 1042 | 1970–71 1971–72 1972–73 1973–74 |
| 4 | Don Carlson | 844 | 1963–64 1964–65 1965–66 1966–67 |
| | Kyle Weems | 844 | 2008–09 2009–10 2010–11 2011–12 |
| 6 | Alize Johnson | 735 | 2016–17 2017–18 |
| 7 | Lou Shepherd | 701 | 1964–65 1965–66 1966–67 1967–68 |
| 8 | Tamarr Maclin | 697 | 2001–02 2002–03 2003–04 2004–05 |
| 9 | Clint Thomas | 666 | 1991–92 1992–93 1993–94 1994–95 |
| 10 | Carl Wilks | 662 | 1958–59 1959–60 1960–61 1961–62 |

Season
| Rk | Player | Rebounds | Season |
|---|---|---|---|
| 1 | Curtis Perry | 478 | 1969–70 |
| 2 | Curtis Perry | 427 | 1968–69 |
| 3 | Alize Johnson | 384 | 2017–18 |
| 4 | William Doolittle | 380 | 1973–74 |
| 5 | Bill Lea | 379 | 1951–52 |
| 6 | William Doolittle | 376 | 1972–73 |
| 7 | Mike Robinson | 367 | 1979–80 |
| 8 | Lee Campbell | 363 | 1989–90 |
| 9 | Alize Johnson | 351 | 2016–17 |
| 10 | Curtis Perry | 323 | 1967–68 |

Single game
| Rk | Player | Rebounds | Season | Opponent |
|---|---|---|---|---|
| 1 | Curtis Perry | 31 | 1969–70 | Texas-Arlington |
| 2 | Charles Peterson | 30 | 1954–55 | Truman State |
| 3 | Mike Robinson | 26 | 1979–80 | Northwest Missouri |
| 4 | Danny Bolden | 25 | 1964–65 | Missouri S&T |
| | Curtis Perry | 25 | 1969–70 | Southeast Missouri |
| | Curtis Perry | 25 | 1969–70 | Evansville |
| 7 | Curtis Perry | 24 | 1968–69 | Pittsburg State |
| | Mike Robinson | 24 | 1979–80 | Southeast Missouri |
| 9 | Lou Shepherd | 23 | 1965–66 | Truman State |
| | Mike Robinson | 23 | 1979–80 | Missouri S&T |

== Assists ==
Career
| Rk | Player | Assists | Seasons |
|---|---|---|---|
| 1 | Randy Towe | 507 | 1974–75 1975–76 1976–77 1977–78 1978–79 |
| 2 | William Fontleroy | 471 | 1996–97 1997–98 1998–99 1999–00 |
| 3 | Arnold Bernard | 456 | 1989–90 1990–91 |
| 4 | Andy Newton | 444 | 1973–74 1974–75 1975–76 |
| 5 | Brian Smith | 435 | 1981–82 1982–83 1983–84 1984–85 |
| 6 | Basil Robinson | 391 | 1982–83 1983–84 1985–86 1986–87 |
| 7 | Anthony Boggs | 377 | 1980–81 1981–82 1982–83 1983–84 |
| 8 | Daryel Garrison | 374 | 1971–72 1972–73 1973–74 1974–75 |
| 9 | Dorrian Williams | 373 | 2012–13 2013–14 2014–15 2015–16 |
| 10 | Johnny Murdock | 367 | 1991–92 1992–93 1993–94 1994–95 |

Season
| Rk | Player | Assists | Season |
|---|---|---|---|
| 1 | Arnold Bernard | 257 | 1990–91 |
| 2 | Randy Towe | 241 | 1978–79 |
| 3 | Arnold Bernard | 199 | 1989–90 |
| 4 | Brian Smith | 185 | 1984–85 |
| 5 | Randy Towe | 184 | 1977–78 |
| 6 | Doug Lewis | 183 | 1988–89 |
| 7 | Basil Robinson | 178 | 1986–87 |
| 8 | Michael Bizoukas | 174 | 2011–12 |
| 9 | Andy Newton | 170 | 1974–75 |
| | Basil Robinson | 170 | 1985–86 |

Single game
| Rk | Player | Assists | Season | Opponent |
|---|---|---|---|---|
| 1 | Andy Newton | 21 | 1974–75 | Kentucky Wesleyan |
| 2 | Randy Towe | 17 | 1978–79 | Northwest Missouri |
| 3 | Randy Towe | 15 | 1977–78 | Northwest Missouri |
| | Randy Towe | 15 | 1978–79 | Drury |
| | Doug Lewis | 15 | 1988–89 | Texas Wesleyan |
| | Josh Webster | 15 | 2018–19 | UAPB |
| 7 | Randy Towe | 14 | 1977–78 | Southeast Missouri |
| | Randy Towe | 14 | 1978–79 | Eastern Illinois |
| | Randy Towe | 14 | 1978–79 | Southeast Missouri |
| | Doug Lewis | 14 | 1988–89 | Oral Roberts |

== Steals ==
Career
| Rk | Player | Steals | Seasons |
|---|---|---|---|
| 1 | Kevin Ault | 243 | 1996–97 1997–98 1998–99 1999–00 |

Season
| Rk | Player | Steals | Season |
|---|---|---|---|
| 1 | Arnold Bernard | 82 | 1990–91 |
| 2 | Kevin Ault | 80 | 1998–99 |
| 3 | Winston Garland | 77 | 1985–86 |
| 4 | Keith Hilliard | 76 | 1981–82 |
| 5 | Jimmie Dull | 75 | 1977–78 |
| 6 | Winston Garland | 64 | 1986–87 |
| 7 | Kevin Ault | 63 | 1999–00 |
| 8 | Anthony Boggs | 61 | 1982–83 |
| 9 | Brian Smith | 60 | 1984–85 |
| 10 | Jimmie Dull | 58 | 1976–77 |

Single game
| Rk | Player | Steals | Season | Opponent |
|---|---|---|---|---|
| 1 | Winston Garland | 8 | 1985–86 | Pittsburgh |
| 2 | Doug Lewis | 7 | 1987–88 | Illinois-Chicago |
| 3 | Jimmie Dull | 6 | 1976–77 | Missouri S&T |
| | Jimmie Dull | 6 | 1977–78 | Northwest Missouri |
| | Jimmie Dull | 6 | 1977–78 | Lincoln |
| | Randy Towe | 6 | 1978–79 | Central Missouri |
| | Larry Lewis | 6 | 1979–80 | Evansville |
| | Keith Hilliard | 6 | 1981–82 | Wis.-Eau Claire |
| | Winston Garland | 6 | 1985–86 | Benedictine |
| | Arnold Bernard | 6 | 1990–91 | Washington |
| | Rodney Perry | 6 | 1992–93 | Indiana State |
| | Anthony Edwards | 6 | 1993–94 | Tulsa |
| | Kevin Ault | 6 | 1998–99 | Long Beach State |
| | Deven Mitchell | 6 | 2004–05 | Illinois State |
| | Spencer Laurie | 6 | 2007–08 | Indiana State |
| | Chris Kendrix | 6 | 2015–16 | Utah State |
| | Jarred Dixon | 6 | 2015–16 | Illinois State |

== Blocks ==
Career
| Rk | Player | Blocks | Seasons |
|---|---|---|---|
| 1 | Obediah Church | 201 | 2015–16 2016–17 2017–18 2018–19 |
| 2 | Danny Moore | 167 | 1996–97 1997–98 1998–99 |
| 3 | Ed Liliensiek | 144 | 1977–78 1978–79 1979–80 1980–81 |
| 4 | Drew Richards | 133 | 2004–05 2005–06 2006–07 2007–08 |
| 5 | Ricky Johnson | 125 | 1981–82 1982–83 |
| 6 | Kyle Weems | 114 | 2008–09 2009–10 2010–11 2011–12 |
| 7 | Tamarr Maclin | 96 | 2001–02 2002–03 2003–04 2004–05 |
| 8 | Donovan Clay | 94 | 2021–22 2022–23 2023–24 |
| 9 | Gaige Prim | 92 | 2019–20 2020–21 2021–22 |
| 10 | Johnny Epps | 90 | 1994–95 1995–96 |

Season
| Rk | Player | Blocks | Season |
|---|---|---|---|
| 1 | Danny Moore | 84 | 1998–99 |
| 2 | Obediah Church | 74 | 2016–17 |
| 3 | Ricky Johnson | 68 | 1981–82 |
| 4 | Johnny Epps | 60 | 1995–96 |
| | Obediah Church | 60 | 2017–18 |
| 6 | Ricky Johnson | 57 | 1982–83 |
| 7 | Ed Liliensiek | 54 | 1979–80 |
| 8 | N.J. Benson | 51 | 2023–24 |
| 9 | Danny Moore | 50 | 1996–97 |
| | Obediah Church | 50 | 2015–16 |

Single game
| Rk | Player | Blocks | Season | Opponent |
|---|---|---|---|---|
| 1 | Scott Hawk | 7 | 1976–77 | Kentucky Wesleyan |
| | Ricky Johnson | 7 | 1982–83 | Valparaiso |
| | Gaige Prim | 7 | 2020–21 | Northern Iowa |
| | N.J. Benson | 7 | 2023–24 | Sam Houston |
| 5 | Ed Liliensiek | 6 | 1979–80 | Henderson State |
| | Ricky Johnson | 6 | 1982–83 | Southern |
| | Ricky Johnson | 6 | 1981–82 | Central Missouri |
| | Jeff Ford | 6 | 1989–90 | Northern Iowa |
| | Tony Graves | 6 | 1992–93 | Drake |
| | Johnny Epps | 6 | 1995–96 | Creighton |
| | Danny Moore | 6 | 1997–98 | Bradley |
| | Danny Moore | 6 | 1998–99 | Texas Southern |
| | Drew Richards | 6 | 2007–08 | Harding |
| | Obediah Church | 6 | 2016–17 | Fontbonne |
| | Obediah Church | 6 | 2016–17 | Drake |
