= List of Northern Iowa Panthers men's basketball seasons =

The Northern Iowa Panthers men's basketball team, located in Cedar Falls, Iowa, is an NCAA Division I basketball team. UNI is currently a member of the Missouri Valley Conference. Northern Iowa has made the NCAA tournament eight times, with a record of 5–8. They have won the conference championship 4 times in the regular season, and 6 times in tournament. They have played 45 seasons from 1980 to 2025 with a total win record of 729–641. The first NCAA Division I tournament appearance was the 1989-1990 season.

The University of Northern Iowa was known as different names before 1967.

- Iowa State Normal School, 1876–1909
- Iowa State Teachers College, 1909–1961
- State College of Iowa, 1961–1967
- University of Northern Iowa, 1967–present

Years	Overall	Conference	NCAA Tournament
1989-90	23-9	6-6	Second round
2003-04	21-10	12-6	First round
2004-05	21-11	11-7	First round
2005-06	23-10	11-7	First round
2006-07	18-13	9-9	Didn't qualify
2007-08	18-14	9-9	Didn't qualify
2008-09	23-11	14-4	First round
2009-10	30-5	15-3	Sweet Sixteen
