= 1989–90 Kansas Jayhawks men's basketball team =

American college basketball season

1989–90 Kansas Jayhawks men's basketball

Preseason NIT Champions

NCAA men's Division I tournament, second round
- Conference: Big Eight Conference

Ranking
- Coaches: No. 5
- AP: No. 5
- Record: 30–5 (11–3 Big Eight)
- Head coach: Roy Williams (2nd season)
- Assistant coaches: Jerry Green (2nd season); Steve Robinson (2nd season); Kevin Stallings (2nd season); Mark Turgeon (3rd season)
- Captains: Rick Calloway; Jeff Gueldner; Kevin Pritchard; Freeman West
- Home arena: Allen Fieldhouse

1989–90 Big Eight Conference men's basketball standings
	Conf.				Overall
Team	W		L	PCT	W		L	PCT
No. 11 Missouri	12	–	2	.857	26	–	6	.813
No. 1 Oklahoma †	11	–	3	.786	27	–	5	.844
No. 5 Kansas	11	–	3	.786	30	–	5	.857
Kansas State	7	–	7	.500	17	–	15	.531
Oklahoma State	6	–	8	.429	17	–	14	.548
Iowa State	4	–	10	.286	10	–	18	.357
Nebraska	3	–	11	.214	10	–	18	.357
Colorado	2	–	12	.143	12	–	18	.400
† 1990 Big Eight tournament winner As of March 3, 2012; Rankings from AP poll

The 1989–90 Kansas Jayhawks men's basketball team represented the University of Kansas in the 1989–90 NCAA Division I men's basketball season, which was the Jayhawks' 92nd basketball season. The head coach was Roy Williams, who was serving his second year at KU. The team played its home games in Allen Fieldhouse in Lawrence, Kansas. They set an NCAA record for largest unranked to ranked jump. Following the preseason NIT, where the Jayhawks defeated the 2nd, 1st, and 25th ranked teams in the nation, the Jayhawks jumped to the 4th ranked team in the nation. They remained in the top two for the remainder of the regular season. The season also marked the beginning of an NCAA-record 32 consecutive NCAA tournament appearances that, as of the 2025 tournament (there was no tournament in 2020 due to the COVID-19 pandemic), was still active. The Jayhawks' 150–95 victory over Kentucky on December 9 remains the most points scored in a game in Kansas basketball history, and the worst defeat in Kentucky's history.

== Roster ==
Name	#	Position	Height	Weight	Year	Home town
Todd Alexander	35	Guard	6–2	190	Freshman	McPherson, Kansas
Terry Brown	3	Guard	6–1	185	Junior	Clyde, New York
Rick Calloway	20	Forward	6–6	190	Senior	Cincinnati, Ohio
Jeff Gueldner	33	Guard/forward	6–5	190	Senior	Charleston, Illinois
Alonzo Jamison	24	Forward	6–5	235	Sophomore	Santa Ana, California
Adonis Jordan	30	Guard	5–11	160	Freshman	Reseda, California
Mike Maddox	32	Forward	6–7	210	Junior	Oklahoma City, Oklahoma
Pekka Markkanen	44	Center	6–10	215	Junior	Jyvaskyla, Finland
Macolm Nash	43	Forward	6–7	195	Sophomore	St. Louis, Missouri
Kevin Pritchard	14	Guard	6–3	180	Senior	Tulsa, Oklahoma
Mark Randall	42	Forward	6–9	230	Junior	Englewood, Colorado
Kirk Wagner	31	Forward	6–7	210	Junior	Pasadena, California
Freeman West	34	Forward	6–5	210	Senior	East Chicago, Indiana
Eric Ridenour	40	Forward	6–5	205	Junior	Cimarron, Kansas

== Big Eight Conference standings ==
#	Team	Conference	Pct.	Overall	Pct.
1	Missouri	12–2	.857	26–6	.813
2	Oklahoma	11–3	.786	27–5	.844
3	Kansas	11–3	.786	30–5	.857
4	Kansas State	7–7	.500	17–15	.531
5	Oklahoma State	6–8	.429	17–14	.548
6	Iowa State	4–10	.286	10–18	.357
7	Nebraska	3–11	.214	10–18	.357
8	Colorado	2–12	.143	12–18	.400

== Schedule ==
Date time, TV	Rank^{#}	Opponent^{#}	Result	Record	Site city, state
11/15/1989*		UAB; Preseason NIT First Round	W 109–83	1–0	Allen Fieldhouse; Lawrence, KS
11/16/1989*		at No. 2 LSU; Preseason NIT Second Round	W 89–83	2–0	Pete Maravich Assembly Center; Baton Rouge, LA
11/22/1989*		vs. No. 1 UNLV; Preseason NIT Semifinals	W 91–77	3–0	Madison Square Garden; New York, NY
11/24/1989*		at No. 25 St. John's; Preseason NIT Championship Game	W 66–57	4–0	Madison Square Garden; New York, NY
11/30/1989*	No. 4	Idaho	W 87–58	5–0	Allen Fieldhouse; Lawrence, KS
12/2/1989*	No. 4	UMBC	W 86–67	6–0	Allen Fieldhouse; Lawrence, KS
12/4/1989*	No. 4	Tennessee-Martin	W 103–48	7–0	Allen Fieldhouse; Lawrence, KS
12/6/1989*	No. 2	at SMU	W 86–53	8–0	Moody Coliseum; University Park, TX
12/9/1989*	No. 2	Kentucky	W 150–95	9–0	Allen Fieldhouse; Lawrence, KS
12/16/1989*	No. 2	Pepperdine	W 98–73	10–0	Allen Fieldhouse; Lawrence, KS
12/22/1989	No. 2	Arizona State	W 90–67	11–0	Allen Fieldhouse; Lawrence, KS
12/29/1989*	No. 2	vs. UTPA	W 103–83	12–0	Kemper Arena; Kansas City, MO
12/30/1989	No. 2	vs. Stanford	W 83–61	13–0	Kemper Arena; Kansas City, MO
1/4/1990*	No. 2	at Wichita State	W 93–66	14–0	Levitt Arena; Wichita, KS
1/6/1990*	No. 2	Winthrop	W 94–54	15–0	Allen Fieldhouse; Lawrence, KS
1/8/1990	No. 2	at Nebraska	W 98–93	16–0	Bob Devaney Sports Center; Lincoln, NE
1/10/1990*	No. 1	at Miami	W 100–73	17–0	Miami Arena; Miami, FL
1/13/1990	No. 1	Oklahoma State	W 91–77	18–0	Allen Fieldhouse; Lawrence, KS
1/18/1990*	No. 1	Elizabeth City State	W 132–65	19–0	Allen Fieldhouse; Lawrence, KS
1/20/1990	No. 1	at No. 4 Missouri; Border War	L 87–95	19–1	Hearnes Center; Columbia, MO
1/27/1990	No. 2	at Kansas State; Sunflower Showdown	W 85–57	20–1	Bramlage Coliseum; Manhattan, KS
1/31/1990	No. 2	Colorado	W 90–69	21–1	Allen Fieldhouse; Lawrence, KS
2/3/1990	No. 2	No. 9 Oklahoma	W 85–74	22–1	Allen Fieldhouse; Lawrence, KS
2/7/1990	No. 2	at Oklahoma State	W 83–76	23–1	Gallagher-Iba Arena; Stillwater, OK
2/10/1990	No. 2	at Iowa State	W 88–83	24–1	Hilton Coliseum; Ames, IA
2/13/1990	No. 1	No. 2 Missouri; Border War	L 71–77	24–2	Allen Fieldhouse; Lawrence, KS
2/17/1990	No. 1	Nebraska	W 94–67	25–2	Allen Fieldhouse; Lawrence, KS
2/21/1990	No. 2	at Colorado	W 103–71	26–2	Coors Events Center; Boulder, CO
2/24/1990	No. 2	Kansas State; Sunflower Showdown	W 70–58	27–2	Allen Fieldhouse; Lawrence, KS
2/27/1990	No. 1	at No. 5 Oklahoma	L 78–100	27–3	Lloyd Noble Center; Norman, OK
3/3/1990	No. 1	Iowa State	W 96–63	28–3	Allen Fieldhouse; Lawrence, KS
Big Eight Tournament
3/9/1990	No. 2	vs. Iowa State; Quarterfinals	W 118–75	29–3	Kemper Arena; Kansas City, MO
3/10/1990	No. 2	vs. No. 1 Oklahoma; Semifinals	L 77–95	29–4	Kemper Arena; Kansas City, MO
NCAA tournament
3/16/1990*	(2 E) No. 5	vs. (15 E) Robert Morris; First Round	W 79–71	30–4	Omni Coliseum; Atlanta, GA
3/18/1990*	(2 E) No. 5	vs. (7 E) UCLA; Second Round	L 70–71	30–5	Omni Coliseum; Atlanta, GA
*Non-conference game. ^{#}Rankings from AP Poll, NCAA tournament seeds shown in parentheses. (#) Tournament seedings in parentheses. All times are in Central Standard Time.

== Rankings ==
Poll	Pre	Wk 1	Wk 2	Wk 3	Wk 4	Wk 5	Wk 6	Wk 7	Wk 8	Wk 9	Wk 10	Wk 11	Wk 12	Wk 13	Wk 14	Wk 15	Wk 16
AP		4	2	2	2	2	2	1	1	2	2	2	1	2	1	2	5
Coaches																	

*There was no coaches poll in week 1.

== See also ==
- 1990 NCAA Division I men's basketball tournament
