= 1989 AMCU-8 men's basketball tournament =

Men's basketball tournament

1989 Association of Mid-Continent Universities men's basketball tournament
- Classification: Division I
- Season: 1988–89
- Teams: 7
- Site: John Q. Hammons Student Center; Springfield, Missouri
- Champions: Southwest Missouri State (2nd title)
- Winning coach: Charlie Spoonhour (2nd title)
- MVP: Hubert Henderson (Southwest Missouri State)
- Association of Mid-Continent Universities men's basketball tournaments

1988–89 AMCU-8 Conference men's basketball standings
| | Conf. | | | | Overall |
| Team | W | | L | PCT | W | | L | PCT |
|---|---|---|---|---|---|---|---|---|
| Southwest Missouri State † | 10 | – | 2 | .833 | 21 | – | 10 | .677 |
| Northern Iowa | 8 | – | 4 | .667 | 19 | – | 9 | .679 |
| Eastern Illinois | 7 | – | 5 | .583 | 16 | – | 16 | .500 |
| Wisconsin–Green Bay | 6 | – | 6 | .500 | 14 | – | 14 | .500 |
| Valparaiso | 4 | – | 8 | .333 | 10 | – | 19 | .345 |
| Western Illinois | 4 | – | 8 | .333 | 9 | – | 19 | .321 |
| Illinois–Chicago | 3 | – | 9 | .250 | 13 | – | 17 | .433 |
| Cleveland State | 0 | – | 0 | – | 16 | – | 12 | .571 |
† 1989 AMCU-8 tournament winner

The 1989 AMCU-8 men's basketball tournament was held March 6–8, 1989, at the John Q. Hammons Student Center at Southwest Missouri State University in Springfield, Missouri.

Southwest Missouri State defeated Illinois–Chicago in the title game, 73–67, to win their second AMCU-8 championship. The Bears earned an automatic bid to the 1989 tournament as the #14 seed in the West region where they lost 60–51 in the opening round to eventual national runner-up Seton Hall.

== Format ==
Seven conference members qualified for the tournament. The top seed, Southwest Missouri State, was given a bye to the semifinal round. The other six teams were paired in the quarterfinal round with seedings based on regular season record.

== Bracket ==
Quarterfinals; Thursday, March 6
4 | Wisconsin–Green Bay | 51
5 | Valparaiso | 53
2 | Northern Iowa | 69
7 | Illinois–Chicago | 90
3 | Eastern Illinois | 81
6 | Western Illinois | 47

Semifinals; Friday, March 7
1 | Southwest Missouri State | 82
5 | Valparaiso | 50
7 | Illinois–Chicago | 91
3 | Eastern Illinois | 75

Final; Saturday, March 8
1 | Southwest Missouri State | 73
7 | Illinois–Chicago | 67
