= Charlie Spoonhour =

American basketball player-coach (1939–2012)

Biographical details
- Born: June 23, 1939; Mulberry, Kansas, U.S.
- Died: February 1, 2012 (aged 72); Chapel Hill, North Carolina, U.S.

Playing career
- 1958–1961: Ozarks

Coaching career (HC unless noted)
- 1961–1963: Rocky Comfort HS (MO)
- 1963–1967: Bloomfield HS (MO) (co-HC)
- 1967–1968: Salem HS (MO)
- 1968–1972: Southwest Missouri State (assistant)
- 1972–1974: Moberly JC
- 1974–1975: Oklahoma (assistant)
- 1975–1981: Southeastern CC (IA)
- 1981–1983: Nebraska (assistant)
- 1983–1992: Southwest Missouri State
- 1992–1999: Saint Louis
- 2001–2004: UNLV

Head coaching record
- Overall: 373–202 (college); 205–63 (junior college)
- Tournaments: 3–8 (NCAA Division I); 3–5 (NIT)

Accomplishments and honors

Championships
- 4 Mid-Continent regular season (1987–1990); 2 Mid-Continent tournament (1987, 1989); MVC tournament (1992)

Awards
- Henry Iba Award (1994); 3x Mid-Continent Coach of the Year (1984, 1987, 1988)

Charles Graham Spoonhour (June 23, 1939 – February 1, 2012) was an American basketball coach.

Spoonhour was born in Mulberry, Kansas, attended high school in Rogers, Arkansas, and received an education degree from the University of the Ozarks. He spent seven seasons as a high school basketball coach, then fourteen seasons bouncing between Division I assistant coaching positions and junior college head coaching positions. This included a four-year stretch from 1969 to 1973 as an assistant coach on the staff of head coach Bill Thomas at then-Division II Southwest Missouri State (now Missouri State).

Ten years later, Spoonhour was on the staff of Nebraska coach Moe Iba, when he was hired as head coach of SMS for the 1983–84 season, a year after the Bears had moved up to Division I. He led the Bears to five NCAA tournament appearances in a six-season stretch from 1987 to 1992. His best season was in 1986–87 when the Bears won the Mid-Continent Conference with a 13–1 mark and finished 28–6. Behind future NBA point guard Winston Garland, they made it to the second round of the 1987 NCAA tournament as a #13-seed, beating fourth-seeded Clemson, 65–60, before losing to fifth-seeded Kansas, 67–63.

After the 1991–92 season, he went to Saint Louis University, where he led the Billikens to three NCAA tournament appearances in seven seasons. In 2001, he went to the University of Nevada, Las Vegas, where he retired from coaching following the 2003-04 season.

Spoonhour was known for wearing sweaters and slacks while coaching.

In 2010, he was diagnosed with idiopathic pulmonary fibrosis, and placed on the recipient list for a lung transplant. He received the lung transplant at Duke University Medical Center in August 2010, and was said to be in good condition, according to the St. Louis Post-Dispatch. He spent the next six months recuperating at Duke.

On February 1, 2012, Spoonhour died at the age of 72.

On April 6, 2012, Spoonhour's son, Jay Spoonhour, was named the head men's basketball coach at Eastern Illinois University.

== Head coaching record ==
=== College ===
Record table
Season	Team	Overall	Conference	Standing	Postseason
Southwest Missouri State Bears (Association of Mid-Continent Universities / Mid-Continent Conference) (1983–1990)
1983–84	Southwest Missouri State	18–10	9–5	3rd	
1984–85	Southwest Missouri State	17–13	8–6	4th	
1985–86	Southwest Missouri State	24–8	10–4	2nd	NIT Quarterfinal
1986–87	Southwest Missouri State	28–6	13–1	1st	NCAA Division I Second Round
1987–88	Southwest Missouri State	22–7	12–2	1st	NCAA Division I First Round
1988–89	Southwest Missouri State	21–10	10–2	1st	NCAA Division I First Round
1989–90	Southwest Missouri State	22–7	11–1	1st	NCAA Division I First Round
Southwest Missouri State Bears (Missouri Valley Conference) (1990–1992)
1990–91	Southwest Missouri State	22–12	11–5	2nd	NIT First Round
1991–92	Southwest Missouri State	23–8	13–5	3rd	NCAA Division I First Round
Southwest Missouri State:		197–81 (.709)	97–31 (.758)		
Saint Louis Billikens (Great Midwest Conference) (1992–1995)
1992–93	Saint Louis	12–17	1–9	6th	
1993–94	Saint Louis	23–6	8–4	T–2nd	NCAA Division I First Round
1994–95	Saint Louis	23–8	8–4	2nd	NCAA Division I Second Round
Saint Louis Billikens (Conference USA) (1995–1999)
1995–96	Saint Louis	16–14	4–10	3rd (Blue)	NIT First Round
1996–97	Saint Louis	11–18	4–10	3rd (Blue)	
1997–98	Saint Louis	22–11	11–5	3rd (American)	NCAA Division I Second Round
1998–99	Saint Louis	15–16	8–8	5th (American)	
Saint Louis:		122–90 (.575)	44–50 (.468)		
UNLV Runnin' Rebels (Mountain West Conference) (2001–2004)
2001–02	UNLV	21–11	9–5	3rd	NIT Second Round
2002–03	UNLV	21–11	8–6	T–3rd	NIT First Round
2003–04	UNLV	12–9	4–6	5th	
UNLV:		54–31 (.635)	21–17 (.553)		
Total:		373–202 (.649)	162–98 (.623)		
National champion Postseason invitational champion Conference regular season champion Conference regular season and conference tournament champion Division regular season champion Division regular season and conference tournament champion Conference tournament champion
