= 1987 AMCU-8 men's basketball tournament =

- Classification: Division I
- Season: 1986–87
- Teams: 8
- Site: John Q. Hammons Student Center; Springfield, Missouri
- Champions: Southwest Missouri State (1st title)
- Winning coach: Charlie Spoonhour (1st title)
- MVP: Winston Garland (Southwest Missouri State)
- AMCU-8 men's basketball tournaments

1986–87 AMCU-8 Conference men's basketball standings
	Conf.				Overall
Team	W		L	PCT	W		L	PCT
Southwest Missouri State †	13	–	1	.929	28	–	6	.824
Cleveland State	10	–	4	.714	25	–	8	.758
Illinois–Chicago	9	–	5	.643	17	–	15	.531
Wisconsin–Green Bay	8	–	6	.571	15	–	14	.517
Northern Iowa	7	–	7	.500	13	–	15	.464
Valparaiso	4	–	10	.286	12	–	16	.429
Eastern Illinois	3	–	11	.214	9	–	19	.321
Western Illinois	2	–	12	.143	12	–	16	.429
† 1987 AMCU-8 tournament winner

The 1987 AMCU-8 men's basketball tournament was held March 5–7, 1987, at the John Q. Hammons Student Center at Southwest Missouri State University in Springfield, Missouri.

Southwest Missouri State defeated Cleveland State in the title game, 90–87, to win their first AMCU-8 championship. The Bears earned an automatic bid to the 1987 tournament.

== Format ==
All eight conference members qualified for the tournament. First round seedings were based on regular season record.

== Bracket ==
Quarterfinals; Thursday, March 5
1	Southwest Missouri State	81
8	Western Illinois	60
4	Wisconsin–Green Bay	75
5	Northern Iowa	69
2	Cleveland State	60
7	Eastern Illinois	53
3	Illinois–Chicago	95
6	Valparaiso	74

Semifinals; Friday, March 6
1	Southwest Missouri State	61
4	Wisconsin–Green Bay	59
2	Cleveland State	94
3	Illinois–Chicago	78

Final; Saturday, March 7
1	Southwest Missouri State	90
2	Cleveland State	87
