= 1989–90 Missouri Tigers men's basketball team =

American college basketball season

1989–90 Missouri Tigers men's basketball

Maui Invitational champions Big Eight Regular Season Champions

NCAA tournament, first round
- Conference: Big Eight Conference

Ranking
- Coaches: No. 11
- AP: No. 11
- Record: 26–6 (12–2 Big 8)
- Head coach: Norm Stewart (23rd season)
- Assistant coach: Bob Sundvold (12th season)
- Home arena: Hearnes Center

1989–90 Big Eight Conference men's basketball standings
| | Conf. | | | | Overall |
| Team | W | | L | PCT | W | | L | PCT |
|---|---|---|---|---|---|---|---|---|
| No. 11 Missouri | 12 | – | 2 | .857 | 26 | – | 6 | .813 |
| No. 1 Oklahoma † | 11 | – | 3 | .786 | 27 | – | 5 | .844 |
| No. 5 Kansas | 11 | – | 3 | .786 | 30 | – | 5 | .857 |
| Kansas State | 7 | – | 7 | .500 | 17 | – | 15 | .531 |
| Oklahoma State | 6 | – | 8 | .429 | 17 | – | 14 | .548 |
| Iowa State | 4 | – | 10 | .286 | 10 | – | 18 | .357 |
| Nebraska | 3 | – | 11 | .214 | 10 | – | 18 | .357 |
| Colorado | 2 | – | 12 | .143 | 12 | – | 18 | .400 |
† 1990 Big Eight tournament winner As of March 3, 2012; Rankings from AP poll

The 1989–90 Missouri Tigers men's basketball team represented the University of Missouri as a member of the Big Eight Conference during the 1989–90 NCAA men's basketball season. Led by head coach Norm Stewart, the Tigers won the Big Eight regular season title and were the No. 1 ranked team in the country before an upset by Colorado in the Big Eight Conference Tourney and a stunning loss to 14-seed Northern Iowa in the first round of the NCAA Tourney NCAA tournament. The Tigers finished with an overall record of 26–6 (12–2 Big Eight).

== Roster ==
1989–90 Missouri Tigers men's basketball team
Players
Coaches

| Pos. | # | Name | Height | Weight | Year | Hometown |
|---|---|---|---|---|---|---|
| G | 4 | Lee Coward | 6 ft 1 in (1.85 m) | — | Sr |
| G | 5 | Travis Ford | 5 ft 9 in (1.75 m) | — | Fr | Madisonville, Kentucky |
| F | 34 | Doug Smith | 6 ft 10 in (2.08 m) | 220 lb (100 kg) | Jr | Detroit, Michigan |
| G | 44 | Anthony Peeler | 6 ft 4 in (1.93 m) | 205 lb (93 kg) | So | Kansas City, Missouri |

Head coach

- Norm Stewart (Missouri)

Assistant coach(es)

Legend

- (C) Team captain
- (S) Suspended
- (I) Ineligible
- (W) Walk-on
- Injured
- Current redshirt

== Schedule and results ==
| Date time, TV | Rank^{#} | Opponent^{#} | Result | Record | Site (attendance) city, state |
Regular season
| Nov 24, 1989* | No. 11 | vs. Evansville; Maui Invitational | W 68–53 | 1–0 | Lahaina Civic Center; Lahaina, HI |
| Nov 25, 1989* | No. 11 | vs. No. 12 Louisville; Maui Invitational | W 82–79 | 2–0 | Lahaina Civic Center; Lahaina, HI |
| Nov 26, 1989* | No. 11 | vs. No. 7 North Carolina; Maui Invitational Championship | W 80–73 | 3–0 | Lahaina Civic Center; Lahaina, HI |
| Dec 2, 1989* | No. 5 | Tennessee-Martin | W 78–58 | 4–0 | Hearnes Center; Columbia, MO |
| Dec 4, 1989* | No. 5 | Creighton | W 86–79 | 5–0 | Hearnes Center; Columbia, MO |
| Dec 6, 1989* | No. 4 | Hawaii-Loa | W 106–48 | 6–0 | Hearnes Center; Columbia, MO |
| Dec 9, 1989* | No. 4 | at Old Dominion | W 88–75 | 7–0 | Norfolk Scope; Norfolk, VA |
| Dec 12, 1989* | No. 4 | at No. 7 Arkansas | W 89–88 | 8–0 | Barnhill Arena (9,486); Fayetteville, AR |
| Dec 16, 1989* | No. 4 | Bradley | W 86–77 | 9–0 | Hearnes Center; Columbia, MO |
| Dec 20, 1989* | No. 4 | vs. No. 5 Illinois; Braggin' Rights | L 93–101 | 9–1 | St. Louis Arena (18,398); St. Louis, MO |
| Dec 27, 1989* | No. 7 | at No. 15 Memphis State | W 71–65 | 10–1 | Mid-South Coliseum; Memphis, TN |
| Dec 30, 1989* | No. 4 | Nebraska–Kearney | W 86–77 | 11–1 | Hearnes Center; Columbia, MO |
| Jan 2, 1990* | No. 7 | Austin Peay | W 84–48 | 12–1 | Hearnes Center; Columbia, MO |
| Jan 6, 1990 | No. 7 | Oklahoma State | W 78–68 | 13–1 (1–0) | Hearnes Center; Columbia, MO |
| Jan 10, 1990* | No. 5 | Southern | W 106–87 | 14–1 | Hearnes Center; Columbia, MO |
| Jan 13, 1990 | No. 5 | at Nebraska | W 111–95 | 15–1 (2–0) | Bob Devaney Sports Center; Lincoln, NE |
| Jan 16, 1990 | No. 4 | at Oklahoma State | W 72–71 | 16–1 (3–0) | Gallagher-Iba Arena; Stillwater, OK |
| Jan 20, 1990 | No. 4 | No. 1 Kansas; Border War | W 95–87 | 17–1 (4–0) | Hearnes Center; Columbia, MO |
| Jan 23, 1990* | No. 1 | Rutgers | W 89–84 | 18–1 | Hearnes Center; Columbia, MO |
| Jan 27, 1990 | No. 1 | at Colorado | W 104–89 | 19–1 (5–0) | CU Events Center; Boulder, CO |
| Jan 31, 1990 | No. 1 | at Iowa State | W 95–93 | 20–1 (6–0) | Hilton Coliseum; Ames, IA |
| Feb 4, 1990 | No. 1 | Colorado | W 93–69 | 21–1 (7–0) | Hearnes Center; Columbia, MO |
| Feb 8, 1990 | No. 1 | at Kansas State | L 58–65 | 21–2 (7–1) | Bramlage Coliseum; Manhattan, KS |
| Feb 10, 1990 | No. 1 | Nebraska | W 107–85 | 22–2 (8–1) | Hearnes Center; Columbia, MO |
| Feb 13, 1990 | No. 2 | at No. 1 Kansas; Border War | W 77–71 | 23–2 (9–1) | Allen Fieldhouse; Lawrence, KS |
| Feb 18, 1990 | No. 2 | No. 11 Oklahoma | W 92–90 | 24–2 (10–1) | Hearnes Center; Columbia, MO |
| Feb 21, 1990 | No. 1 | Iowa State | W 89–85 | 25–2 (11–1) | Hearnes Center; Columbia, MO |
| Feb 25, 1990 | No. 1 | at No. 10 Oklahoma | L 90–107 | 25–3 (11–2) | Lloyd Noble Center; Norman, OK |
| Feb 28, 1990 | No. 3 | Kansas State | W 65–60 | 26–3 (12–2) | Hearnes Center; Columbia, MO |
| Mar 3, 1990* | No. 3 | at Notre Dame | L 67–98 | 26–4 | Joyce Center; South Bend, IN |
Big Eight Conference tournament
| Mar 9, 1990* | (1) No. 6 | vs. (8) Colorado; Big Eight tournament Quarterfinal | L 88–92 ^{OT} | 26–5 | Kemper Arena; Kansas City, Missouri |
NCAA tournament
| Mar 16, 1990* | (3 SE) No. 11 | vs. (14 SE) Northern Iowa; First Round | L 71–74 | 26–6 | Richmond Coliseum; Richmond, VA |
*Non-conference game. ^{#}Rankings from AP. (#) Tournament seedings in parentheses. SE=Southeast. All times are in Central.

== Awards ==
- Doug Smith – Big Eight Player of the Year, Consensus Second-Team All-American
