= 1989–90 Oklahoma Sooners men's basketball team =

American college basketball season

1989–90 Oklahoma Sooners men's basketball

NCAA Division I regular season champions Big 8 Conference tournament champions

NCAA men's Division I tournament, Second Round
- Conference: Big 8 Conference

Ranking
- Coaches: No. 1
- AP: No. 1
- Record: 27–5 (11–3 Big 8)
- Head coach: Billy Tubbs (10th season)
- Home arena: Lloyd Noble Center (Capacity: 11,528)

1989–90 Big Eight Conference men's basketball standings
	Conf.				Overall
Team	W		L	PCT	W		L	PCT
No. 11 Missouri	12	–	2	.857	26	–	6	.813
No. 1 Oklahoma †	11	–	3	.786	27	–	5	.844
No. 5 Kansas	11	–	3	.786	30	–	5	.857
Kansas State	7	–	7	.500	17	–	15	.531
Oklahoma State	6	–	8	.429	17	–	14	.548
Iowa State	4	–	10	.286	10	–	18	.357
Nebraska	3	–	11	.214	10	–	18	.357
Colorado	2	–	12	.143	12	–	18	.400
† 1990 Big Eight tournament winner As of March 3, 2012; Rankings from AP poll

The 1989–90 Oklahoma Sooners men's basketball team represented the University of Oklahoma in competitive college basketball during the 1989–90 NCAA Division I season. The Oklahoma Sooners men's basketball team played its home games in the Lloyd Noble Center and was a member of the National Collegiate Athletic Association's (NCAA) former Big Eight Conference at that time. The team posted a 27–5 overall record and an 11–3 conference record to finish tied for second in the Conference for head coach Billy Tubbs. This was the third Big Eight Conference tournament Championship for Tubbs and his third NCAA Division I men's basketball tournament #1 seed in a row. The team earned the conference tournament championship competing in a conference in which three teams held the #1 national ranking in consecutive weeks in late February and early March.

The team was led by All-Big Eight Conference First Team selection Skeeter Henry. The team won its first twelve games, while rising to the #3 ranking, before losing back to back road games to unranked Kansas State and #23 Arizona. The team then won three consecutive home games before losing to #2 Kansas on the road. It then won four games before losing to #2 Missouri. The team then won 8 contests in a row including back to back victories over #1 ranked teams (Missouri and Kansas) at the end of February as well as a rubber match victory against Kansas in the Big Eight Conference tournament semifinals. The team earned the school's third consecutive #1 seed in the 1990 NCAA Division I men's basketball tournament, but was eliminated in the second round by North Carolina 79–77.

Terry Evans became the first Sooner to make all six of his three point shots in a game, and Jackie Jones set the school single-game record with 9 blocked shots. The team exploded for 173 points on November 29, 1989, against U.S. International and three nights later set another school record by defeating Northeastern Illinois by 95 points (146–51). The team also established the current school record of 86 rebounds against U.S. International.

== Roster ==
1989–90 Oklahoma Sooners men's basketball team
Players
Coaches

Pos.	#	Name	Height	Weight	Year	Previous school	Hometown
G	30	Skeeter Henry	6 ft 7 in (2.01 m)	180 lb (82 kg)	Sr	Midland College	Grand Prairie, TX
G	32	Jeff Webster	6 ft 7 in (2.01 m)	213 lb (97 kg)	Fr	Carl Albert	Midwest City, OK
F	50	Tony Martin	6 ft 7 in (2.01 m)	230 lb (104 kg)		Manual Arts	Los Angeles, CA
G	24	Terrence Mullins	6 ft 2 in (1.88 m)	198 lb (90 kg)	Jr	Riordan	San Francisco, CA
G	11	Jason Skurcenski	6 ft 2 in (1.88 m)	172 lb (78 kg)	Jr	Bartlesville	Bartlesville, OK
G		Brent Price (redshirt)	6 ft 1 in (1.85 m)	165 lb (75 kg)	Jr	South Carolina	Enid, Oklahoma

Head coach

- Billy Tubbs

Assistant coach(es)

- Mike Mims
- Jim Kerwin

Legend

- (C) Team captain
- (S) Suspended
- (I) Ineligible
- (W) Walk-on
- Injured
- Current redshirt

Roster

== Schedule and results ==
Date time, TV	Rank^{#}	Opponent^{#}	Result	Record	Site city, state
Regular season
Nov 29, 1989*	No. 17	U.S. International	W 173–101	1–0	Lloyd Noble Center; Norman, Oklahoma
Dec 2, 1989*	No. 17	Northeastern Illinois	W 146–51	2–0	Lloyd Noble Center; Norman, Oklahoma
Dec 4, 1989*	No. 12	Angelo State	W 130–62	3–0	Lloyd Noble Center; Norman, Oklahoma
Dec 9, 1989*	No. 12	No. 5 UNLV	W 89–81	4–0	Lloyd Noble Center; Norman, Oklahoma
Dec 23, 1989*	No. 7	at Loyola Marymount	W 136–121	5–0	Gersten Pavilion; Los Angeles, California
Dec 27, 1989*	No. 6	James Madison	W 142–109	6–0	Lloyd Noble Center; Norman, Oklahoma
Dec 29, 1989*	No. 6	vs. North Texas; All-College Tournament	W 147–94	7–0	Myriad Convention Center; Oklahoma City, Oklahoma
Dec 30, 1989*	No. 6	vs. Tulsa; All-College Tournament	W 99–78	8–0	Myriad Convention Center; Oklahoma City, Oklahoma
Jan 3, 1990*	No. 6	Alaska Anchorage	W 101–81	9–0	Lloyd Noble Center; Norman, Oklahoma
Jan 6, 1990	No. 6	at Colorado	W 66–61	10–0 (1–0)	Coors Events Center; Boulder, Colorado
Jan 9, 1990*	No. 4	Arkansas–Little Rock	W 134–81	11–0	Lloyd Noble Center; Norman, Oklahoma
Jan 13, 1990*	No. 4	Texas	W 103–84	12–0	Lloyd Noble Center; Norman, Oklahoma
Jan 16, 1990	No. 3	at Kansas State	L 51–66	12–1 (1–1)	Bramlage Coliseum; Manhattan, Kansas
Jan 20, 1990*	No. 3	at No. 23 Arizona	L 74–78	12–2	McKale Center; Tucson, Arizona
Jan 24, 1990	No. 9	Iowa State	W 107–96	13–2 (2–1)	Lloyd Noble Center; Norman, Oklahoma
Jan 27, 1990	No. 9	Oklahoma State	W 109–92	14–2 (3–1)	Lloyd Noble Center; Norman, Oklahoma
Jan 31, 1990	No. 9	Nebraska	W 105–64	15–2 (4–1)	Lloyd Noble Center; Norman, Oklahoma
Feb 3, 1990	No. 9	at No. 2 Kansas	L 74–85	15–3 (4–2)	Allen Fieldhouse; Lawrence, Kansas
Feb 7, 1990	No. 13	at Iowa State	W 86–81	16–3 (5–2)	Hilton Coliseum; Ames, Iowa
Feb 11, 1990*	No. 13	at Seton Hall	W 89–84	17–3	Brendan Byrne Arena; East Rutherford, New Jersey
Feb 13, 1990	No. 11	Kansas State	W 85–69	18–3 (6–2)	Lloyd Noble Center; Norman, Oklahoma
Feb 16, 1990	No. 11	Colorado	W 86–64	19–3 (7–2)	Lloyd Noble Center; Norman, Oklahoma
Feb 18, 1990	No. 11	at No. 2 Missouri	L 90–92	19–4 (7–3)	Hearnes Center; Columbia, Missouri
Feb 21, 1990	No. 10	at Nebraska	W 88–66	20–4 (8–3)	Bob Devaney Sports Center; Lincoln, Nebraska
Feb 25, 1990	No. 10	No. 1 Missouri	W 107–90	21–4 (9–3)	Lloyd Noble Center; Norman, Oklahoma
Feb 27, 1990	No. 6	No. 1 Kansas	W 100–78	22–4 (10–3)	Lloyd Noble Center; Norman, Oklahoma
Mar 3, 1990	No. 6	at Oklahoma State	W 107–94	23–4 (11–3)	Gallagher-Iba Arena; Stillwater, Oklahoma
Big Eight tournament
Mar 9, 1990*	No. 1	vs. Nebraska; Quarterfinals	W 78–65	24–4	Kemper Arena; Kansas City, Missouri
Mar 10, 1990*	No. 1	vs. No. 2 Kansas; Semifinals	W 95–77	25–4	Kemper Arena; Kansas City, Missouri
Mar 11, 1990*	No. 1	vs. Colorado; Championship game	W 92–80	26–4	Kemper Arena; Kansas City, Missouri
NCAA tournament
Mar 15, 1990*	(1 MW) No. 1	vs. (16 MW) Towson State; First round	W 77–68	27–4	Frank Erwin Center; Austin, Texas
Mar 17, 1990*	(1 MW) No. 1	vs. (8 MW) North Carolina; Second round	L 77–79	27–5	Frank Erwin Center; Austin, Texas
*Non-conference game. ^{#}Rankings from AP Poll. (#) Tournament seedings in parentheses. MW=Midwest.

=== NCAA basketball tournament ===
The following were the team's results in the NCAA Division I men's basketball tournament.

- West
  - Oklahoma (1) 77, Towson State (16) 68
  - North Carolina (8) 79, Oklahoma 77

== Awards and honors ==
- All-Big Eight Conference first team: Skeeter Henry

== Team players drafted into the NBA ==
No one from the Sooners was selected in the 1990 NBA draft. No varsity letter-winners from this team who were drafted in the NBA draft in later years: However, Brent Price, who spent the year redshirtting was drafted in the 1992 NBA draft with the 32nd overall selection in the 2nd round by the Washington Bullets.

== See also ==
- Oklahoma Sooners men's basketball
- List of Oklahoma Sooners Men's Basketball Conference Championships
- 1990 NCAA Division I men's basketball tournament
