= 1989–90 Northern Iowa Panthers men's basketball team =

American college basketball season

1989–90 Northern Iowa Panthers men's basketball

Mid-Con tournament champions

NCAA tournament, Second round
- Conference: Mid-Continent Conference
- Record: 23–9 (6–6 Mid-Con)
- Head coach: Eldon Miller (4th season)
- Assistant coaches: Kevin Boyle (4th season); Kevin Lehman (4th season); Samuel Skarich (4th season)
- Home arena: UNI-Dome

1989–90 Mid-Continent Conference men's basketball standings
	Conf.				Overall
Team	W		L	PCT	W		L	PCT
Southwest Missouri State	11	–	1	.917	22	–	7	.759
Wisconsin–Green Bay	9	–	3	.750	24	–	8	.750
Western Illinois	6	–	6	.500	16	–	13	.552
Northern Iowa †	6	–	6	.500	23	–	9	.719
Illinois–Chicago	6	–	6	.500	16	–	12	.571
Eastern Illinois	3	–	9	.250	10	–	18	.357
Valparaiso	1	–	11	.083	4	–	24	.143
Cleveland State	0	–	0	–	15	–	13	.536
† 1990 Mid-Con Tournament winner Rankings from AP Poll

The 1989–90 Northern Iowa Panthers men's basketball team represented the University of Northern Iowa as a member of the Mid-Continent Conference during the 1989-90 NCAA Division I men's basketball season. The team was led by head coach Eldon Miller and played their home games at the UNI-Dome in Cedar Falls, Iowa. The Panthers won the Mid-Con tournament to earn an automatic bid to the NCAA tournament — the school’s first trip to the "Big Dance." In the first round, UNI upset No. 3 seed Missouri, 74–71. The Panthers fell to No. 6 seed Minnesota, 81–78, in the second round. The team finished with a record of 23–9 (6–6 in the Mid-Con).

The 1989–90 team was inducted into the UNI Athletics Hall of Fame in 2011.

== Roster ==
1989–90 Northern Iowa Panthers men's basketball team
Players
Coaches

Pos.	#	Name	Height	Weight	Year	Hometown
C	00	Jason Reese	6 ft 8 in (2.03 m)	240 lb (109 kg)	Sr	Des Moines, Iowa
PG	11	Dale Turner	6 ft 2 in (1.88 m)	193 lb (88 kg)	So	Venice, Illinois
G	20	Maurice Newby	6 ft 4 in (1.93 m)	180 lb (82 kg)	Jr	Des Moines, Iowa
F	21	Brian Jones (redshirt)	6 ft 9 in (2.06 m)	185 lb (84 kg)	Fr	Rock Island, Illinois
G	22	Jonathan Cox	5 ft 10 in (1.78 m)	180 lb (82 kg)	Sr	Springfield, Illinois
G	23	Chris Nuss	6 ft 4 in (1.93 m)	207 lb (94 kg)	So	Cedar Falls, Iowa
F	24	Kent Pollpeter	6 ft 5 in (1.96 m)	175 lb (79 kg)	Jr	West Point, Iowa
F	32	Cedrick McCullough	6 ft 4 in (1.93 m)	204 lb (93 kg)	So	Maywood, Illinois
F/C	33	Scott Socha	6 ft 7 in (2.01 m)	190 lb (86 kg)	Sr	Marshalltown, Iowa
G/F	34	Brad Hill	6 ft 5 in (1.96 m)	204 lb (93 kg)	Jr	Akron, Ohio
C	40	Nick Pace	6 ft 10 in (2.08 m)	239 lb (108 kg)	So	Winterset, Iowa
C	42	Terry Merfeld	6 ft 9 in (2.06 m)	206 lb (93 kg)	Fr	Hudson, Iowa
G/F	44	Troy Muilenburg	6 ft 5 in (1.96 m)	222 lb (101 kg)	Jr	Davenport, Iowa
F	50	Steve Phyfe	6 ft 8 in (2.03 m)	201 lb (91 kg)	Sr	Nashua, Iowa

Head coach

- Eldon Miller (Wittenberg)

Assistant coach(es)

- Kevin Boyle (Iowa)
- Kevin Lehman (Wartburg)
- Samuel Skarich (Notre Dame)
- Mark Ackerman (Graduate assistant)
- Nick Nurse (Student assistant)

Legend

- (C) Team captain
- (S) Suspended
- (I) Ineligible
- (W) Walk-on
- Injured
- Current redshirt

== Schedule and results ==
Date time, TV	Rank^{#}	Opponent^{#}	Result	Record	Site city, state
Regular season
Nov 27, 1989*; 7:35 p.m.		Missouri Western	W 99–84	1–0	UNI-Dome; Cedar Falls, Iowa
Dec 2, 1989*; 5:35 p.m.		at Drake; Iowa Big Four	W 71–63 ^{OT}	2–0	Veterans Memorial Auditorium; Des Moines, Iowa
Dec 4, 1989*; 7:35 p.m.		Northwest Missouri State	W 110–82	3–0	UNI-Dome; Cedar Falls, Iowa
Dec 9, 1989*; 3:35 p.m.		Northern Illinois	W 63–59	4–0	UNI-Dome; Cedar Falls, Iowa
Dec 11, 1989*; 7:30 p.m.		at Sam Houston State	W 92–79	5–0	Johnson Coliseum; Huntsville, Texas
Dec 16, 1989*; 1:00 p.m.		at Iowa State; Iowa Big Four	L 80–92	5–1	Hilton Coliseum; Ames, Iowa
Dec 27, 1989*; 7:30 p.m.		at Nevada	W 89–88	6–1	Lawlor Events Center; Reno, Nevada
Dec 29, 1989*; 7:30 p.m.		vs. No. 3 Georgetown	L 49–83	6–2	Thomas & Mack Center (4,348); Paradise, Nevada
Jan 3, 1990*; 7:05 p.m.		No. 20 Iowa; Iowa Big Four	W 77–74	7–2	UNI-Dome (22,797); Cedar Falls, Iowa
Jan 6, 1990*; 7:35 p.m.		Stephen F. Austin	W 120–96	8–2	UNI-Dome; Cedar Falls, Iowa
Jan 8, 1990*; 7:35 p.m.		Sam Houston State	W 100–77	9–2	UNI-Dome; Cedar Falls, Iowa
Jan 10, 1990*; 7:05 p.m.		at Northern Illinois	W 63–62	10–2	Chick Evans Field House; DeKalb, Illinois
Jan 15, 1990; 7:30 p.m.		at Western Illinois	L 61–64	10–3 (0–1)	Western Hall; Macomb, Illinois
Jan 17, 1990; 7:30 p.m.		at Eastern Illinois	W 67–65	11–3 (1–1)	Lantz Arena; Charleston, Illinois
Jan 20, 1990; 7:35 p.m.		Wisconsin–Green Bay	L 58–59	11–4 (1–2)	UNI-Dome; Cedar Falls, Iowa
Jan 22, 1990; 7:35 p.m.		Illinois-Chicago	W 75–47	12–4 (2–2)	UNI-Dome; Cedar Falls, Iowa
Jan 27, 1990; 1:30 p.m.		at Valparaiso	W 89–80	13–4 (3–2)	Athletics-Recreation Center; Valparaiso, Indiana
Jan 29, 1990; 7:30 p.m.		at Cleveland State	W 77–75	14–4	Woodling Gym; Cleveland, Ohio
Feb 3, 1990; 7:35 p.m.		SW Missouri State	L 72–82	14–5 (3–3)	UNI-Dome; Cedar Falls, Iowa
Feb 5, 1990; 7:35 p.m.		Eastern Illinois	W 68–54	15–5 (4–3)	UNI-Dome; Cedar Falls, Iowa
Feb 10, 1990; 7:35 p.m.		Western Illinois	W 86–71	16–5 (5–3)	UNI-Dome; Cedar Falls, Iowa
Feb 12, 1990*; 7:35 p.m.		Chicago State	W 96–81	17–5	UNI-Dome; Cedar Falls, Iowa
Feb 17, 1990; 7:35 p.m.		at Wisconsin–Green Bay	L 50–64	17–6 (5–4)	Brown County Arena; Green Bay, Wisconsin
Feb 19, 1990; 7:30 p.m.		at Illinois-Chicago	L 60–63	17–7 (5–5)	UIC Pavilion; Chicago, Illinois
Feb 24, 1990; 7:35 p.m.		Valparaiso	W 90–62	18–7 (6–5)	UNI-Dome; Cedar Falls, Iowa
Feb 26, 1990; 7:35 p.m.		Cleveland State	W 78–76	19–7	UNI-Dome; Cedar Falls, Iowa
Mar 1, 1990; 7:35 p.m.		at SW Missouri State	L 86–94	19–8 (6–6)	Hammons Student Center; Springfield, Missouri
Mid-Continent Conference tournament
Mar 5, 1990*	(4)	(5) Illinois-Chicago; Quarterfinals	W 99–94 ^{3OT}	20–8	UNI-Dome; Cedar Falls, Iowa
Mar 6, 1990*	(4)	(1) SW Missouri State; Semifinals	W 63–61	21–8	UNI-Dome; Cedar Falls, Iowa
Mar 7, 1990*	(4)	(2) Wisconsin–Green Bay; Championship	W 53–45	22–8	UNI-Dome; Cedar Falls, Iowa
NCAA Tournament
Mar 16, 1990*; ESPN	(14 SE)	vs. (3 SE) No. 11 Missouri; First Round	W 74–71	23–8	Richmond Coliseum; Richmond, Virginia
Mar 18, 1990*	(14 SE)	vs. (6 SE) No. 20 Minnesota; Second Round	L 78–81	23–9	Richmond Coliseum; Richmond, Virginia
*Non-conference game. ^{#}Rankings from AP Poll. (#) Tournament seedings in parentheses. SE=Southeast. All times are in Central Time.
