= 1989–90 Kansas State Wildcats men's basketball team =

American college basketball season

1989–90 Kansas State Wildcats men's basketball

NCAA tournament, First Round
- Conference: Big Eight Conference
- Record: 17–15 (7–7 Big Eight)
- Head coach: Lon Kruger (4th season)
- Assistant coach: Greg Grensing
- Home arena: Bramlage Coliseum

1989–90 Big Eight Conference men's basketball standings
	Conf.				Overall
Team	W		L	PCT	W		L	PCT
No. 11 Missouri	12	–	2	.857	26	–	6	.813
No. 1 Oklahoma †	11	–	3	.786	27	–	5	.844
No. 5 Kansas	11	–	3	.786	30	–	5	.857
Kansas State	7	–	7	.500	17	–	15	.531
Oklahoma State	6	–	8	.429	17	–	14	.548
Iowa State	4	–	10	.286	10	–	18	.357
Nebraska	3	–	11	.214	10	–	18	.357
Colorado	2	–	12	.143	12	–	18	.400
† 1990 Big Eight tournament winner As of March 3, 2012; Rankings from AP poll

The 1989–90 Kansas State Wildcats men's basketball team represented Kansas State University as a member of the Big 8 Conference during the 1989–90 NCAA Division I men's basketball season. The head coach was Lon Kruger who was in his fourth (and final) season at the helm of his alma mater. The team played its home games at Bramlage Coliseum in Manhattan, Kansas. The Wildcats finished with a record of 17–15 (7–7 Big 8), and received an at-large bid to the NCAA tournament as No. 11 seed in the Midwest region. Kansas State lost to Xavier in the opening round of the tournament.

== Roster ==
1989–90 Kansas State Wildcats men's basketball team
Players
Coaches

Pos.	#	Name	Height	Weight	Year	Hometown
G	12	Steve Henson	5 ft 11 in (1.8 m)	170 lb (77 kg)	Sr	McPherson, Kansas
G	24	Askia Jones	6 ft 5 in (1.96 m)	190 lb (86 kg)	Fr	San Antonio, Texas

Head coach

- Lon Kruger (Kansas State)

Assistant coach(es)

Legend

- (C) Team captain
- (S) Suspended
- (I) Ineligible
- (W) Walk-on
- Injured
- Current redshirt

Roster

== Schedule and results ==
Date time, TV	Rank^{#}	Opponent^{#}	Result	Record	Site city, state
Regular Season
Nov 24, 1989*		vs. Florida State; Great Alaska Shootout	W 71–70	1–0	Sullivan Arena; Anchorage, Alaska
Nov 25, 1989*		vs. Hawaii; Great Alaska Shootout	W 79–76	2–0	Sullivan Arena; Anchorage, Alaska
Nov 27, 1989*		vs. Michigan State; Great Alaska Shootout	L 68–73	2–1	Sullivan Arena; Anchorage, Alaska
Dec 4, 1989*		at Baylor	W 60–53	3–1	Ferrell Center; Waco, Texas
Dec 6, 1989*		Missouri-Kansas City	W 78–57	4–1	Bramlage Coliseum; Manhattan, Kansas
Dec 8, 1989*		Fresno State	L 58–60	4–2	Bramlage Coliseum; Manhattan, Kansas
Dec 9, 1989*		at Vanderbilt	L 81–91	4–3	Memorial Gymnasium; Nashville, Tennessee
Dec 14, 1989*		Tulsa	W 75–69	5–3	Bramlage Coliseum; Manhattan, Kansas
Dec 16, 1989*		Minnesota	L 68–69	5–4	Bramlage Coliseum; Manhattan, Kansas
Dec 23, 1989*		vs. North Carolina	L 63–79	5–5	
Dec 28, 1989*		vs. Austin Peay	W 74–42	6–5	
Dec 29, 1989*		vs. South Carolina	L 60–62	6–6	
Jan 2, 1990*		Western Kentucky	W 75–51	7–6	Bramlage Coliseum; Manhattan, Kansas
Jan 6, 1990		Iowa State	W 72–68	8–6 (1–0)	Bramlage Coliseum; Manhattan, Kansas
Jan 9, 1990*		Southern Utah	W 102–56	9–6	Bramlage Coliseum; Manhattan, Kansas
Jan 13, 1990		at Colorado	L 62–79	9–7 (1–1)	Coors Events/Conference Center; Boulder, Colorado
Jan 16, 1990		No. 3 Oklahoma	W 66–51	10–7 (2–1)	Bramlage Coliseum; Manhattan, Kansas
Jan 20, 1990*		Wichita State	W 83–62	11–7	Bramlage Coliseum; Manhattan, Kansas
Jan 24, 1990*		Akron	W 84–60	12–7	Bramlage Coliseum; Manhattan, Kansas
Jan 27, 1990		No. 2 Kansas; Sunflower Showdown	L 57–85	12–8 (2–2)	Bramlage Coliseum; Manhattan, Kansas
Jan 31, 1990		at Oklahoma State	L 67–89	12–9 (2–3)	Gallagher-Iba Arena; Stillwater, Oklahoma
Feb 3, 1990		at Nebraska	L 71–74	12–10 (2–4)	Bob Devaney Sports Center; Lincoln, Nebraska
Feb 8, 1990		No. 1 Missouri	W 65–58	13–10 (3–4)	Bramlage Coliseum; Manhattan, Kansas
Feb 10, 1990		Colorado	W 93–65	14–10 (4–4)	Bramlage Coliseum; Manhattan, Kansas
Feb 13, 1990		at No. 11 Oklahoma	L 69–85	14–11 (4–5)	Lloyd Noble Center; Norman, Oklahoma
Feb 17, 1990		at Iowa State	W 93–90	15–11 (5–5)	Hilton Coliseum; Ames, Iowa
Feb 20, 1990		Oklahoma State	W 66–60	16–11 (6–5)	Bramlage Coliseum; Manhattan, Kansas
Feb 24, 1990		at No. 2 Kansas; Sunflower Showdown	L 58–70	16–12 (6–6)	Allen Fieldhouse; Lawrence, Kansas
Feb 28, 1990		at No. 3 Missouri	L 60–65	16–13 (6–7)	Hearnes Center; Columbia, Missouri
Mar 3, 1990		Nebraska	W 80–57	17–13 (7–7)	Bramlage Coliseum; Manhattan, Kansas
Big 8 Tournament
Mar 9, 1990*		vs. Oklahoma State; Big Eight Tournament Quarterfinal	L 78–82	17–14	Kemper Arena; Kansas City, Missouri
NCAA Tournament
Mar 16, 1990*	(11 MW)	vs. (6 MW) No. 25 Xavier; First Round	L 79–87	17–15	RCA Dome; Indianapolis, Indiana
*Non-conference game. ^{#}Rankings from AP Poll. (#) Tournament seedings in parentheses. MW=Midwest.
