= Eldon Miller =

American college basketball coach (born 1939)

Biographical details
- Born: June 19, 1939 (age 87); Chester, Pennsylvania, U.S.

Playing career
- 1957–1961: Wittenberg

Coaching career (HC unless noted)
- 1961–1962: Wittenberg (assistant)
- 1962–1970: Wittenberg
- 1970–1976: Western Michigan
- 1976–1986: Ohio State
- 1986–1998: Northern Iowa
- 2008–2020: UNC Pembroke (vol. asst.)

Head coaching record
- Overall: 568–419
- Tournaments: 5–6 (NCAA Division I); 4–3 (NCAA College Division); 7–3 (NIT)

Accomplishments and honors

Championships
- NIT (1986); 5 OAC regular season (1963–1965, 1967, 1969); MAC regular season (1976); MCC tournament (1990)

Awards
- OAC Coach of the Year (1969); MAC Coach of the Year (1976); Big Ten Coach of the Year (1983); MCC Coach of the Year (1989); MVC Coach of the Year (1997)

Eldon Miller (born June 19, 1939) is an American former college basketball coach. The Gnadenhutten, Ohio native has led four different programs in 36 years of coaching: at Wittenberg University (1962–70), Western Michigan University (1971–76), Ohio State University (1977–86) and the University of Northern Iowa (1987–98). His overall record is 568–419 and 5–6 in NCAA Division I men's basketball tournament games.

From 2008 to 2020, Miller was an assistant coach for his son, Ben Miller, at the University of North Carolina at Pembroke.

Miller was inducted into the Ohio Basketball Hall of Fame in 2009. He was also inducted into Wittenberg's Athletics Hall of Honor in 1986. In 2015 he was inducted into the Western Michigan University Athletics Hall of Fame.

In 1976, Miller was named the Mid-American Conference Men's Basketball Coach of the year.

== Head coaching record ==
Record table
Season	Team	Overall	Conference	Standing	Postseason
Wittenberg Tigers (Ohio Athletic Conference) (1962–1970)
1962–63	Wittenberg	26–2	14–0	1st	NCAA College Division Runner-up
1963–64	Wittenberg	18–5	13–1	1st	
1964–65	Wittenberg	17–5	12–2	T–1st	
1965–66	Wittenberg	12–11	7–7	8th	
1966–67	Wittenberg	17–7	12–1	1st	
1967–68	Wittenberg	13–13	8–5	6th	
1968–69	Wittenberg	19–6	11–2	T–1st	NCAA College Division Regional Semifinals
1969–70	Wittenberg	20–6	11–2	2nd	
Wittenberg:		142–55	88–20		
Western Michigan Broncos (Mid-American Conference) (1970–1976)
1970–71	Western Michigan	14–10	5–5	3rd	
1971–72	Western Michigan	10–14	5–5	4th	
1972–73	Western Michigan	8–18	2–10	7th	
1973–74	Western Michigan	13–13	5–7	6th	
1974–75	Western Michigan	16–10	8–6	5th	
1975–76	Western Michigan	25–3	15–1	1st	NCAA Division I Sweet 16
Western Michigan:		86–68	40–34		
Ohio State Buckeyes (Big Ten Conference) (1976–1986)
1976–77	Ohio State	11–16	6–12	9th	
1977–78	Ohio State	16–11	9–9	6th	
1978–79	Ohio State	19–12	12–6	4th	NIT Fourth Place
1979–80	Ohio State	21–8	12–6	2nd	NCAA Division I Sweet 16
1980–81	Ohio State	14–13	9–9	T–5th	
1981–82	Ohio State	21–10	12–6	2nd	NCAA Division I First Round
1982–83	Ohio State	20–10	11–7	T–2nd	NCAA Division I Sweet 16
1983–84	Ohio State	15–14	8–10	T–5th	NIT First Round
1984–85	Ohio State	20–10	11–7	T–3rd	NCAA Division I Second Round
1985–86	Ohio State	19–14	8–10	7th	NIT Champion
Ohio State:		176–118	98–82		
Northern Iowa Panthers (Association of Mid-Continent Universities / Mid-Continent Conference) (1986–1991)
1986–87	Northern Iowa	13–15	7–7	5th	
1987–88	Northern Iowa	10–18	4–10	T–6th	
1988–89	Northern Iowa	19–9	8–4	2nd	
1989–90	Northern Iowa	23–9	6–6	T–3rd	NCAA Division I Second Round
1990–91	Northern Iowa	13–19	8–8	T–4th	
Northern Iowa Panthers (Missouri Valley Conference) (1991–1998)
1991–92	Northern Iowa	10–18	6–12	7th	
1992–93	Northern Iowa	12–15	8–10	6th	
1993–94	Northern Iowa	16–13	10–8	5th	
1994–95	Northern Iowa	8–20	4–14	T–9th	
1995–96	Northern Iowa	14–13	8–10	T–7th	
1996–97	Northern Iowa	16–12	11–7	T–4th	
1997–98	Northern Iowa	10–17	4–14	9th	
Northern Iowa:		164–178	84–110		
Total:		568–419			
National champion Postseason invitational champion Conference regular season champion Conference regular season and conference tournament champion Division regular season champion Division regular season and conference tournament champion Conference tournament champion
