= 1990 Big Eight Conference men's basketball tournament =

- Classification: Division I
- Season: 1989–90
- Teams: 8
- Finals site: Kemper Arena; Kansas City, MO
- Champions: Oklahoma (4th title)
- Winning coach: Billy Tubbs (3rd title)
- MVP: Shaun Vandiver (Colorado)
- Television: Raycom Sports (Quarterfinals, Semi-Finals and Championship); ABC(Championship game)

1989–90 Big Eight Conference men's basketball standings
	Conf.				Overall
Team	W		L	PCT	W		L	PCT
No. 11 Missouri	12	–	2	.857	26	–	6	.813
No. 1 Oklahoma †	11	–	3	.786	27	–	5	.844
No. 5 Kansas	11	–	3	.786	30	–	5	.857
Kansas State	7	–	7	.500	17	–	15	.531
Oklahoma State	6	–	8	.429	17	–	14	.548
Iowa State	4	–	10	.286	10	–	18	.357
Nebraska	3	–	11	.214	10	–	18	.357
Colorado	2	–	12	.143	12	–	18	.400
† 1990 Big Eight tournament winner As of March 3, 2012; Rankings from AP poll

The 1990 Big Eight Conference men's basketball tournament was held March 9–11 at Kemper Arena in Kansas City, Missouri.

Second-seeded Oklahoma defeated #8 seed Colorado in the championship game, 92–80, to earn the conference's automatic bid to the 1990 NCAA tournament.

== Bracket ==
Quarterfinals; Friday, March 9
1	#6 Missouri	88
8	Colorado	92
4	Kansas State	78
5	Oklahoma State	82
3	#2 Kansas	118
6	Iowa State	75
7	Nebraska	65
2	#1 Oklahoma	78

Semifinals; Saturday, March 10
8	Colorado	82
5	Oklahoma State	72
3	#2 Kansas	77
2	#1 Oklahoma	95

Championship; Sunday, March 11
8	Colorado	80
2	#1 Oklahoma	92
