= 1990 Mid-Continent Conference men's basketball tournament =

- Classification: Division I
- Season: 1989–90
- Teams: 7
- Site: UNI-Dome; Cedar Falls, Iowa
- Champions: Northern Iowa (1st title)
- Winning coach: Eldon Miller (1st title)
- MVP: Jason Reese (Northern Iowa)
- Mid-Continent Conference men's basketball tournaments

1989–90 Mid-Continent Conference men's basketball standings
	Conf.				Overall
Team	W		L	PCT	W		L	PCT
Southwest Missouri State	11	–	1	.917	22	–	7	.759
Wisconsin–Green Bay	9	–	3	.750	24	–	8	.750
Western Illinois	6	–	6	.500	16	–	13	.552
Northern Iowa †	6	–	6	.500	23	–	9	.719
Illinois–Chicago	6	–	6	.500	16	–	12	.571
Eastern Illinois	3	–	9	.250	10	–	18	.357
Valparaiso	1	–	11	.083	4	–	24	.143
Cleveland State	0	–	0	–	15	–	13	.536
† 1990 Mid-Con Tournament winner Rankings from AP Poll

The 1990 Mid-Continent Conference men's basketball tournament was held March 5–7, 1990, at the UNI-Dome in Cedar Falls, Iowa. This was the sixth edition of the tournament for the AMCU-8/Mid-Con, now known as the Summit League.

== Bracket ==
Quarterfinals; March 5
4	Northern Iowa	99
5	Illinois–Chicago	94
2	Wisconsin–Green Bay	64
7	Valparaiso	57
3	Western Illinois	71
6	Eastern Illinois	57

Semifinals; March 6
1	Southwest Missouri State	61
4	Northern Iowa	63
2	Wisconsin–Green Bay	49
3	Western Illinois	46

Final; March 7
4	Northern Iowa	53
2	Wisconsin–Green Bay	45
