= 1992 Missouri Valley Conference men's basketball tournament =

- Classification: Division I
- Season: 1991–92
- Teams: 8
- Site: St. Louis Arena; St. Louis, Missouri
- Champions: Southwest Missouri State (1st title)
- Winning coach: Charlie Spoonhour (1st title)
- MVP: Jackie Crawford (Southwest Missouri State)

1991–92 Missouri Valley Conference men's basketball standings
	Conf.				Overall
Team	W		L	PCT	W		L	PCT
Southern Illinois	14	–	4	.778	22	–	8	.733
Illinois State	14	–	4	.778	18	–	11	.621
Southwest Missouri State †	13	–	5	.722	23	–	8	.742
Indiana State	12	–	6	.667	13	–	15	.464
Tulsa	12	–	6	.667	17	–	13	.567
Creighton	7	–	11	.389	9	–	19	.321
Northern Iowa	6	–	12	.333	10	–	18	.357
Wichita State	6	–	12	.333	8	–	20	.286
Drake	3	–	15	.167	6	–	21	.222
Bradley	3	–	15	.167	7	–	23	.233
† 1992 MVC tournament winner Rankings from AP Poll

The 1992 Missouri Valley Conference men's basketball tournament after the conclusion of the 1991–1992 regular season was played at the St. Louis Arena in St. Louis, Missouri.

The Southwest Missouri State Bears defeated the Tulsa Golden Hurricane in the championship game, 71–68, and as a result won their 1st MVC Tournament title and earned an automatic bid to the 1992 NCAA tournament.

== Bracket ==
Quarterfinals; March 7, 1992
1	Southern Illinois	67
8	Wichita State	63
4	Indiana State	65
5	Tulsa	77
2	Illinois State	70
7	Northern Iowa	58
3	Southwest Missouri State	75
6	Creighton	69

Semifinals; March 8, 1992
1	Southern Illinois	79
5	Tulsa	82
2	Illinois State	58^{OT}
3	Southwest Missouri State	61

Final; March 9, 1992
5	Tulsa	68
3	Southwest Missouri State	71
