= 1991–92 Illinois State Redbirds men's basketball team =

American college basketball season

1991–92 Illinois State Redbirds men's basketball

MVC Regular Season Co-Champion
- Conference: Missouri Valley Conference
- Record: 18–11 (14–4 MVC)
- Head coach: Bob Bender (3rd season)
- Assistant coaches: Jay Lowenthal; Billy King; Ray Giacoletti; Bob Morris
- Home arena: Redbird Arena

1991–92 Missouri Valley Conference men's basketball standings
	Conf.				Overall
Team	W		L	PCT	W		L	PCT
Southern Illinois	14	–	4	.778	22	–	8	.733
Illinois State	14	–	4	.778	18	–	11	.621
Southwest Missouri State †	13	–	5	.722	23	–	8	.742
Indiana State	12	–	6	.667	13	–	15	.464
Tulsa	12	–	6	.667	17	–	13	.567
Creighton	7	–	11	.389	9	–	19	.321
Northern Iowa	6	–	12	.333	10	–	18	.357
Wichita State	6	–	12	.333	8	–	20	.286
Drake	3	–	15	.167	6	–	21	.222
Bradley	3	–	15	.167	7	–	23	.233
† 1992 MVC tournament winner Rankings from AP Poll

The 1991–92 Illinois State Redbirds men's basketball team represented Illinois State University during the 1991–92 NCAA Division I men's basketball season. The Redbirds, led by third year head coach Bob Bender, played their home games at Redbird Arena and competed as a member of the Missouri Valley Conference.

They finished the season 18–11, 14–4 in conference play to finish in a tie for first place. They were the number two seed for the Missouri Valley Conference tournament. They were victorious over Northern Iowa University in their quarterfinal game but were defeated by Southwest Missouri State University in their semifinal game.

== Roster ==
1991–92 Illinois State Redbirds men's basketball team
Players
Coaches

Pos.	#	Name	Height	Weight	Year	Hometown
F	42	Scott Fowler	6 ft 5 in (1.96 m)	235 lb (107 kg)	RS Sr	Chicago, IL
G	33	Elvin Florez	6 ft 3 in (1.91 m)	178 lb (81 kg)	Sr	Chicago, IL
G	11	Antoine Hicks	5 ft 9 in (1.75 m)	160 lb (73 kg)	Sr	Chicago, IL
C	4	Reggie Wilson	6 ft 6 in (1.98 m)	225 lb (102 kg)	Sr	Chicago, IL
F	3	Steve Fitch	6 ft 6 in (1.98 m)	190 lb (86 kg)	Jr	Oak Park, IL
G	12	Todd Kagel	5 ft 11 in (1.8 m)	160 lb (73 kg)	Jr	Normal, IL
G	14	Richard Thomas	6 ft 0 in (1.83 m)	170 lb (77 kg)	Jr	Chicago, IL
F	54	Charles Barnes	6 ft 5 in (1.96 m)	185 lb (84 kg)	So	Chicago, IL
F	21	Scott Taylor	6 ft 7 in (2.01 m)	215 lb (98 kg)	So	Newton, MA
F	41	Mike VandeGarde	6 ft 7 in (2.01 m)	190 lb (86 kg)	So	Bloomington, MN
G	34	Todd Wemhoener	6 ft 2 in (1.88 m)	175 lb (79 kg)	So	Quincy, IL
G	22	Chad Altadonna	6 ft 3 in (1.91 m)	175 lb (79 kg)	Fr	Centralia, IL
C	43	Brian Kern	6 ft 9 in (2.06 m)	240 lb (109 kg)	Fr	Vandalia, IL

Head coach

- Bob Bender (Duke)

Assistant coach(es)

- Jay Lowenthal (Vanderbilt)
- Billy King (Duke)
- Ray Giacoletti (Minot State)
- Bob Morris (Western Illinois)

Legend

- (C) Team captain
- (S) Suspended
- (I) Ineligible
- (W) Walk-on
- Injured
- Current redshirt

== Schedule ==
Date time, TV	Rank^{#}	Opponent^{#}	Result	Record	High points	High rebounds	High assists	Site (attendance) city, state
Regular Season
November 23, 1991*; 6:30 pm		at Virginia Commonwealth	L 66–92	0–1	–	–	–	Richmond Coliseum (6,543); Richmond, VA
November 27, 1991*; 7:30 pm		Illinois–Chicago	W 72–64	1–1	–	–	–	Redbird Arena (7,325); Normal, IL
December 2, 1991*; 7:30 pm		at Loyola–Chicago	L 58–71	1–2	–	–	–	Rosemont Horizon (1,202); Rosemont, IL
December 5, 1991*; 6:30 pm		at Butler	L 85–93	1–3	–	–	–	Hinkle Fieldhouse (2,246); Indianapolis, IN
December 7, 1991*; 7:00 pm		Southern Utah	L 81–84	1–4	–	–	–	Redbird Arena (8,222); Normal, IL
December 14, 1991*; 7:00 pm		Idaho State	W 95–63	2–4	–	–	–	Redbird Arena (6,378); Normal, IL
December 21, 1991; 7:05 pm		at Southwest Missouri State	W 61–51	3–4 (1–0)	–	–	–	John Q. Hammons Student Center (7,898); Springfield, MO
December 27, 1991*		vs. Miami (Ohio); Lobo Invitational [Semifinal]	L 51–63	3–5	–	–	–	University Arena (15,501); Albuquerque, NM
December 28, 1991*		vs. Bucknell; Lobo Invitational [Third Place]	L 61–79	3–6	–	–	–	University Arena (15,500); Albuquerque, NM
January 4, 1992; 11:00 am, MVC-TV		at Creighton	W 56–49	4–6 (2–0)	13 – Fowler	8 – Taylor	5 – Thomas	Omaha Civic Auditorium (3,236); Omaha, NE
January 7, 1992; 7:30 pm		Southwest Missouri State	W 69–55	5–6 (3–0)	–	–	–	Redbird Arena (7,084); Normal, IL
January 11, 1992; 7:35 pm		at Northern Iowa	W 73–66	6–6 (4–0)	–	–	–	UNI Dome (5,171); Cedar Falls, IA
January 13, 1992; 7:30 pm		Drake	W 54–51	7–6 (5–0)	–	–	–	Redbird Arena (9,064); Normal, IL
January 18, 1992; 7:30 pm		at Wichita State	L 50–66	7–7 (5–1)	10 – Fowler	5 – VandeGarde	4 – Kagel	Henry Levitt Arena (7,116); Wichita, KS
January 20, 1992; 7:30 pm		at Tulsa	W 73–72	8–7 (6–1)	–	–	–	Tulsa Convention Center (5,439); Tulsa, OK
January 25, 1992; 7:00 pm		Southern Illinois	L 59–64	8–8 (6–2)	–	–	–	Redbird Arena (10,396); Normal, IL
February 1, 1992; 7:00 pm		Tulsa	L 66–67 ^{OT}	8–9 (6–3)	–	–	–	Redbird Arena (9,943); Normal, IL
February 3, 1992; 7:30 pm		Wichita State	W 63–62	9–9 (7–3)	14 – Fitch	12 – Fowler	6 – Thomas	Redbird Arena (7,184); Normal, IL
February 8, 1992; 1:30 pm		at Indiana State	W 64–62	10–9 (8–3)	–	–	–	Hulman Center (6,784); Terre Haute, IN
February 11, 1992; 7:35 pm		at Southern Illinois	L 64–65	10–10 (8–4)	–	–	–	SIU Arena (6,120); Carbondale, IL
February 15, 1992; 7:00 pm, WEEK		Bradley	W 58–46	11–10 (9–4)	–	–	–	Redbird Arena (10,226); Normal, IL
February 17, 1992*; 7:30 pm		Saint Louis	W 68–62	12–10	–	–	–	Redbird Arena (7,445); Normal, IL
February 20, 1992; 7:30 pm		Northern Iowa	W 72–60	13–10 (10–4)	–	–	–	Redbird Arena (8,870); Normal, IL
February 22, 1992; 5:00 pm, MVC-TV		Indiana State	W 44–43	14–10 (11–4)	–	–	–	Redbird Arena (10,239); Normal, IL
February 25, 1992; 7:05 pm, WEEK		at Bradley	W 64–60	15–10 (12–4)	–	–	–	Carver Arena (7,025); Peoria, IL
February 27, 1992; 7:30 pm		Creighton	W 79–62	16–10 (13–4)	22 – Fitch	5 – Fowler, Thomas, Taylor	4 – Fowler, VandeGarde	Redbird Arena (9,901); Normal, IL
March 2, 1992; 7:05 pm		at Drake	W 76–75	17–10 (14–4)	–	–	–	Veterans Memorial Auditorium (4,915); Des Monies, IA
Diet Pepsi Missouri Valley Conference {MVC} tournament
March 7, 1992*	(2)	vs. (7) Northern Iowa; Quarterfinal	W 70–58	18–10	20 – Fowler	6 – Fowler, VandeGarde, Wemhoener	3 – Wemhoener	The Arena (6,220); St. Louis, MO
March 8, 1992*	(2)	vs. (3) Southwest Missouri State; Semifinal	L 58–61 ^{OT}	18–11	14 – Taylor, VandeGarde	10 – Taylor	4 – Wemhoener	The Arena (7,429); St. Louis, MO
*Non-conference game. ^{#}Rankings from AP Poll. (#) Tournament seedings in parentheses. All times are in Central Standard Time.
