= 1989–90 Southwest Missouri State Bears basketball team =

American college basketball season

1989–90 Southwest Missouri State Bears basketball

Mid-Con Regular Season Champions

NCAA tournament
- Conference: Mid-Continent Conference
- Record: 22–7 (11–1 Mid-Con)
- Head coach: Charlie Spoonhour (7th season)
- Assistant coach: Derek Thomas (1st season)
- Home arena: Hammons Student Center

1989–90 Mid-Continent Conference men's basketball standings
	Conf.				Overall
Team	W		L	PCT	W		L	PCT
Southwest Missouri State	11	–	1	.917	22	–	7	.759
Wisconsin–Green Bay	9	–	3	.750	24	–	8	.750
Western Illinois	6	–	6	.500	16	–	13	.552
Northern Iowa †	6	–	6	.500	23	–	9	.719
Illinois–Chicago	6	–	6	.500	16	–	12	.571
Eastern Illinois	3	–	9	.250	10	–	18	.357
Valparaiso	1	–	11	.083	4	–	24	.143
Cleveland State	0	–	0	–	15	–	13	.536
† 1990 Mid-Con Tournament winner Rankings from AP Poll

The 1989–90 Southwest Missouri State Bears basketball team represented Southwest Missouri State University in National Collegiate Athletic Association (NCAA) Division I men's basketball during the 1989–90 season. Playing in the Mid-Continent Conference and led by head coach Charlie Spoonhour, the Bears finished the season with a 22–7 overall record and won the Mid-Con regular season title. Southwest Missouri State lost to North Carolina in the opening round of the NCAA tournament.

== Roster ==
1989–90 Missouri State Bears men's basketball team
Players
Coaches

Pos.	#	Name	Height	Weight	Year	Hometown
G		Darryl Reid	6 ft 2 in (1.88 m)	—	Jr
F		Lee Campbell	6 ft 7 in (2.01 m)	—	Sr

Head coach

- Charlie Spoonhour (Ozarks)

Assistant coach(es)

- Derek Thomas (Missouri–St. Louis)

Legend

- (C) Team captain
- (S) Suspended
- (I) Ineligible
- (W) Walk-on
- Injured
- Current redshirt

== Schedule and results ==
Date time, TV	Rank^{#}	Opponent^{#}	Result	Record	Site city, state
Regular season
Nov 24, 1989*		vs. La Salle; Coors Light Classic	L 58–62	0–1	Selland Arena; Fresno, California
Nov 25, 1989*		vs. Saint Mary's; Coors Light Classic	W 52–35	1–1	Selland Arena; Fresno, California
Dec 2, 1989*		at Tulsa	W 73–66	2–1	Tulsa Convention Center; Tulsa, Oklahoma
Dec 5, 1989*		at Wichita State	L 68–81	2–2	Levitt Arena; Wichita, Kansas
Dec 8, 1989*		Southern Utah	W 91–76	3–2	Hammons Student Center; Springfield, Missouri
Dec 9, 1989*		Creighton	W 81–74	4–2	Hammons Student Center; Springfield, Missouri
Mid-Con tournament
Mar 6, 1990*		at Northern Iowa; Mid-Con Tournament Semifinal	L 61–63	22–6	UNI-Dome; Cedar Falls, Iowa
NCAA tournament
Mar 15, 1990*	(9 MW)	vs. (8 MW) North Carolina; First Round	L 70–83	22–7	Frank Erwin Center; Austin, Texas
*Non-conference game. ^{#}Rankings from AP Poll. (#) Tournament seedings in parentheses. MW=Midwest. All times are in Central Time.

== Awards and honors ==
- Lee Campbell – Mid-Con Player of the Year
