= 1986–87 Southwest Missouri State Bears basketball team =

American college basketball season

1986–87 Southwest Missouri State Bears basketball

AMCU-8 Regular Season Champions AMCU-8 tournament champions

NCAA tournament, second round
- Conference: Association of Mid-Continent Universities
- Record: 28–6 (13–1 AMCU-8)
- Head coach: Charlie Spoonhour (4th season)
- Home arena: Hammons Student Center

1986–87 AMCU-8 Conference men's basketball standings
	Conf.				Overall
Team	W		L	PCT	W		L	PCT
Southwest Missouri State †	13	–	1	.929	28	–	6	.824
Cleveland State	10	–	4	.714	25	–	8	.758
Illinois–Chicago	9	–	5	.643	17	–	15	.531
Wisconsin–Green Bay	8	–	6	.571	15	–	14	.517
Northern Iowa	7	–	7	.500	13	–	15	.464
Valparaiso	4	–	10	.286	12	–	16	.429
Eastern Illinois	3	–	11	.214	9	–	19	.321
Western Illinois	2	–	12	.143	12	–	16	.429
† 1987 AMCU-8 tournament winner

The 1986–87 Southwest Missouri State Bears basketball team represented Southwest Missouri State University in National Collegiate Athletic Association (NCAA) Division I men's basketball during the 1986–87 season. Playing in the Summit League (AMCU-8) and led by head coach Charlie Spoonhour, the Bears finished the season with a 28–6 overall record and won the AMCU-8 regular season and conference tournament titles. Southwest Missouri State upset No. 4 seed Clemson, then lost to No. 5 seed Kansas in the round of 32 in the NCAA tournament.

== Roster ==
1986–87 Missouri State Bears men's basketball team
Players
Coaches

Pos.	#	Name	Height	Weight	Year	Hometown
G		Winston Garland	6 ft 2 in (1.88 m)	170 lb (77 kg)	Sr	Gary, Indiana
F		Lee Campbell	6 ft 7 in (2.01 m)	—	Fr

Head coach

- Charlie Spoonhour (Ozarks)

Assistant coach(es)

Legend

- (C) Team captain
- (S) Suspended
- (I) Ineligible
- (W) Walk-on
- Injured
- Current redshirt

== Schedule and results ==
Date time, TV	Rank^{#}	Opponent^{#}	Result	Record	Site city, state
Regular season
Nov 28, 1986*		vs. Drake	L 62–74	0–1	
Nov 29, 1986*		vs. Southeastern Louisiana	W 81–45	1–1	
Dec 5, 1986*		at Missouri	L 53–57	2–2	Hearnes Center; Columbia, Missouri
Dec 22, 1986*		Arkansas	W 56–49	5–3	Hammons Student Center; Springfield, Missouri
Dec 30, 1986*		at Illinois State	L 55–59	5–4	Horton Field House; Normal, Illinois
Jan 6, 1987*		at BYU	W 62–61	6–4	Marriott Center; Provo, Utah
AMCU-8 tournament
Mar 5, 1987*	(1)	(8) Western Illinois; Quarterfinals	W 81–60	25–5	Hammons Student Center; Springfield, Missouri
Mar 6, 1987*	(1)	(4) Wisconsin–Green Bay; Semifinals	W 61–59	26–5	Hammons Student Center; Springfield, Missouri
Mar 7, 1987*	(1)	(2) Cleveland State; Championship game	W 90–87	27–5	Hammons Student Center; Springfield, Missouri
NCAA tournament
Mar 13, 1987*	(13 SE)	vs. (4 SE) No. 13 Clemson; Second round	W 65–60	28–5	The Omni; Atlanta, Georgia
Mar 15, 1987*	(13 SE)	vs. (5 SE) No. 20 Kansas; Second round	L 63–67	28–6	The Omni; Atlanta, Georgia
*Non-conference game. ^{#}Rankings from AP Poll. (#) Tournament seedings in parentheses. SE=Southeast. All times are in Central Time.

== Awards and honors ==
- Winston Garland – AMCU-8 Player of the Year
