= 1989–90 Iowa State Cyclones men's basketball team =

American college basketball season

1989–90 Iowa State Cyclones men's basketball
- Conference: Big Eight Conference
- Record: 10-18 (4-10 Big Eight)
- Head coach: Johnny Orr (10th season)
- Home arena: Hilton Coliseum

1989–90 Big Eight Conference men's basketball standings
	Conf.				Overall
Team	W		L	PCT	W		L	PCT
No. 11 Missouri	12	–	2	.857	26	–	6	.813
No. 1 Oklahoma †	11	–	3	.786	27	–	5	.844
No. 5 Kansas	11	–	3	.786	30	–	5	.857
Kansas State	7	–	7	.500	17	–	15	.531
Oklahoma State	6	–	8	.429	17	–	14	.548
Iowa State	4	–	10	.286	10	–	18	.357
Nebraska	3	–	11	.214	10	–	18	.357
Colorado	2	–	12	.143	12	–	18	.400
† 1990 Big Eight tournament winner As of March 3, 2012; Rankings from AP poll

The 1989–90 Iowa State Cyclones men's basketball team represented Iowa State University during the 1989–90 NCAA Division I men's basketball season. The Cyclones were coached by Johnny Orr, who was in his 10th season. They played their home games at Hilton Coliseum in Ames, Iowa.

They finished the season 10–18, 4–10 in Big Eight play to finish in sixth place. They lost to third-seeded Kansas in the 1990 Big Eight conference tournament quarterfinals.

Games were televised by ESPN, Raycom Sports, and the Cyclone Television Network.

== Previous season ==
The previous season the Cyclones finished the season 17–12, 7–7 in Big Eight play to finish in a tie for fourth place. They defeated Oklahoma State in the 1990 Big Eight conference tournament quarterfinals before losing to Oklahoma, 76–74, in the semifinals. They qualified for the NCAA tournament, losing to UCLA in the first round of the Southeast Regional.

== Roster ==
Roster
Name	Position
Victor Alexander	Center
Terry Woods	Guard
Doug Collins	Guard
Kirk Baker	Forward
Justus Thigpen	Guard
Paul Doerrfeld	Forward
Phil Kunz	Center
Brian Pearson	Guard
Adrian Moore	Forward
Bryan Heger	Senior
Norman Brown	Forward
David Washington	Guard

== Schedule and results ==
Date time, TV	Rank^{#}	Opponent^{#}	Result	Record	Site city, state
Exhibition
November 11, 1989*; 7:00 pm, Cyclone Television Network		Australian National Team; Exhibition	W 89-86		Hilton Coliseum; Ames, Iowa
Regular season
November 25, 1989*; 3:00 pm, Cyclone Television Network		Toledo	W 87-69	1-0	Hilton Coliseum; Ames, Iowa
November 27, 1989*; 7:00 pm		Florida A&M	W 93-68	2-0	Hilton Coliseum; Ames, Iowa
December 2, 1989*; 1:00 pm, Cyclone Television Network		at No. 10 Michigan	L 78-101	2-1	Crisler Arena; Ann Arbor, Michigan
December 7, 1989*; 7:00 pm, Cyclone Television Network		Iowa; Cy-Hawk Rivalry	L 87-89	2-2	Hilton Coliseum; Ames, Iowa
December 9, 1989*; 7:00 pm, Cyclone Television Network		at Minnesota	L 82-98	2-3	Williams Arena; Minneapolis, Minnesota
December 12, 1989*; 7:05 pm, Iowa Cable Network		at Drake; Iowa Big Four	W 117-114 ^{OT}	3-3	Veterans Memorial Auditorium; Des Moines, Iowa
December 16, 1989*; 1:00 pm, Cyclone Television Network		Northern Iowa; Iowa's Big Four	W 92-80	4-3	Hilton Coliseum; Ames, Iowa
December 23, 1989*; 3:00 pm, Cyclone Television Network		at No. 11 Indiana	L 66-115	4-4	Assembly Hall; Bloomington, Indiana
Exhibition
December 30, 1989*; 1:00 pm		Marathon Oil; Exhibition	W 87-74		Hilton Coliseum; Ames, Iowa
Regular season
January 3, 1990*; 8:00 pm, Cyclone Television Network		at Illinois-Chicago	L 75-76	4-5	UIC Pavilion; Chicago
January 6, 1990; 2:30 pm, Raycom		at Kansas State	L 68-72	4-6 (0-1)	Bramlage Coliseum; Manhattan, Kansas
January 10, 1990*; 7:30 pm, Cyclone Television Network		at Houston	L 82-83	4-7	Hofheinz Pavilion; Houston, Texas
January 13, 1990*; 7:00 pm		Davidson	W 86-71	5-7	Hilton Coliseum; Ames, Iowa
January 16, 1990*; 7:00 pm, Cyclone Television Network		Creighton	L 94-99 ^{2OT}	5-8	Hilton Coliseum; Ames, Iowa
January 20, 1990; 3:00 pm, Raycom		Colorado	W 117-96	6-8 (1-1)	Hilton Coliseum; Ames, Iowa
January 24, 1990; 8:00 pm, Cyclone Television Network		at No. 9 Oklahoma	L 96-107	6-9 (1-2)	Lloyd Noble Center; Norman, Oklahoma
January 27, 1990; 7:00 pm, Cyclone Television Network		at Nebraska	W 91-83	7-9 (2-2)	Devaney Sports Center; Lincoln, Nebraska
January 31, 1990; 7:00 pm, Cyclone Television Network		No. 1 Missouri	L 93-95	7-10 (2-3)	Hilton Coliseum; Ames, Iowa
February 3, 1990; 3:00 pm, Raycom		at Oklahoma State	L 78-86	7-11 (2-4)	Gallagher-Iba Arena; Stillwater, Oklahoma
February 7, 1990; 7:00 pm, Cyclone Television Network		No. 13 Oklahoma	L 81-86	7-12 (2-5)	Hilton Coliseum; Ames, Iowa
February 10, 1990; 3:00 pm, Raycom		No. 2 Kansas	L 83-88	7-13 (2-6)	Hilton Coliseum; Ames, Iowa
February 13, 1990; 6:00 pm CT, Cyclone Television Network		at Colorado	L 60-83	7-14 (2-7)	Coors Events Center; Boulder, Colorado
February 17, 1990; 1:00 pm, Raycom		Kansas State	L 90-93 ^{OT}	7-15 (2-8)	Hilton Coliseum; Ames, Iowa
February 19, 1990; 8:00 pm, Cyclone Television Network		at Loyola-Chicago	W 74-69	8-15	Rosemont Horizon; Rosemont, Illinois
February 21, 1990; 7:00 pm, Cyclone Television Network		at No. 1 Missouri	L 85-89	8-16 (2-9)	Hearnes Center; Columbia, Missouri
February 24, 1990; 1:00 pm, Raycom		Nebraska	W 101-85	9-16 (3-9)	Hilton Coliseum; Ames, Iowa
March 1, 1990; 8:40 pm, ESPN		Oklahoma State	W 83-72	10-16 (4-9)	Hilton Coliseum; Ames, Iowa
March 3, 1990; 3:00 pm, Raycom		at No. 1 Kansas	L 63-96	10-17 (4-10)	Allen Fieldhouse; Lawrence, Kansas
Big Eight tournament
March 9, 1990; 8:20 pm, Raycom		vs. No. 2 Kansas; Big Eight tournament quarterfinals	L 75-118	10-18	Kemper Arena; Kansas City, Missouri
*Non-conference game. ^{#}Rankings from AP poll. (#) Tournament seedings in parentheses. All times are in Central Time.

== Awards and honors ==
- All-Big Eight Selections
  Victor Alexander (2nd, AP, UPI)
  Terry Woods (HM, AP, UPI)
  Doug Collins (HM, AP, UPI)
- Academic All-Big Eight
  Phil Kunz
- Ralph Olsen Award
  Doug Collins
  Terry Woods
