= 1988–89 Southwest Missouri State Bears basketball team =

American college basketball season

1988–89 Southwest Missouri State Bears basketball

AMCU-8 Regular Season Champions AMCU-8 tournament champions

NCAA tournament
- Conference: Association of Mid-Continent Universities
- Record: 21–10 (10–2 AMCU-8)
- Head coach: Charlie Spoonhour (6th season)
- Home arena: Hammons Student Center

1988–89 AMCU-8 Conference men's basketball standings
	Conf.				Overall
Team	W		L	PCT	W		L	PCT
Southwest Missouri State †	10	–	2	.833	21	–	10	.677
Northern Iowa	8	–	4	.667	19	–	9	.679
Eastern Illinois	7	–	5	.583	16	–	16	.500
Wisconsin–Green Bay	6	–	6	.500	14	–	14	.500
Valparaiso	4	–	8	.333	10	–	19	.345
Western Illinois	4	–	8	.333	9	–	19	.321
Illinois–Chicago	3	–	9	.250	13	–	17	.433
Cleveland State	0	–	0	–	16	–	12	.571
† 1989 AMCU-8 tournament winner

The 1988–89 Southwest Missouri State Bears basketball team represented Southwest Missouri State University in National Collegiate Athletic Association (NCAA) Division I men's basketball during the 1988–89 season. Playing in the Summit League (AMCU-8) and led by head coach Charlie Spoonhour, the Bears finished the season with a 21–10 overall record and won the AMCU-8 regular season and conference tournament titles. Southwest Missouri State lost to Seton Hall in the opening round of the NCAA tournament.

== Roster ==
1988–89 Missouri State Bears men's basketball team
Players
Coaches

Pos.	#	Name	Height	Weight	Year	Hometown
G		Darryl Reid	6 ft 2 in (1.88 m)	—	So
F		Lee Campbell	6 ft 7 in (2.01 m)	—	Jr
C	42	Kelby Stuckey	6 ft 7 in (2.01 m)	—	Sr

Head coach

- Charlie Spoonhour (Ozarks)

Assistant coach(es)

Legend

- (C) Team captain
- (S) Suspended
- (I) Ineligible
- (W) Walk-on
- Injured
- Current redshirt

== Schedule and results ==
Date time, TV	Rank^{#}	Opponent^{#}	Result	Record	Site city, state
Regular season
Nov 18, 1988*		at No. 14 Missouri; Preseason NIT	L 54–73	0–1	Hearnes Center; Columbia, Missouri
Nov 26, 1988*		at Wyoming	W 53–51	1–1	Arena-Auditorium; Laramie, Wyoming
Dec 3, 1988*		Texas Wesleyan	W 105–51	2–1	Hammons Student Center; Springfield, Missouri
Dec 6, 1988*		Saint Louis	W 50–47	3–1	Hammons Student Center; Springfield, Missouri
Dec 9, 1988*		Mississippi Valley State	W 73–45	4–1	Hammons Student Center; Springfield, Missouri
Dec 10, 1988*		Northern Arizona	W 63–48	5–1	Hammons Student Center; Springfield, Missouri
Dec 15, 1988*		at Wichita State	L 59–66	5–2	Levitt Arena; Wichita, Kansas
Dec 20, 1988*		Illinois State	L 51–55	5–3	Hammons Student Center; Springfield, Missouri
Dec 22, 1988*		Southern Illinois	L 64–72	5–4	Hammons Student Center; Springfield, Missouri
Dec 29, 1988*		vs. East Tennessee State; BMA Holiday Classic	W 72–68	6–4	Kemper Arena; Kansas City, Missouri
Dec 30, 1988*		vs. No. 20 Kansas; BMA Holiday Classic	L 73–82	6–5	Kemper Arena; Kansas City, Missouri
Jan 3, 1989*		Kansas State	W 58–55	7–5	Hammons Student Center; Springfield, Missouri
Jan 7, 1989*		Tulsa	W 76–68	8–5	Hammons Student Center; Springfield, Missouri
1989 AMCU-8 men's basketball tournament
Mar 7, 1989*		Valparaiso; AMCU-8 Tournament Semifinal	W 82–50	19–9	Hammons Student Center; Springfield, Missouri
Mar 8, 1989*		Illinois-Chicago; AMCU-8 tournament championship	W 73–67	20–9	Hammons Student Center; Springfield, Missouri
1989 NCAA Division I men's basketball tournament
Mar 17, 1989*	(14 W)	vs. (3 W) No. 11 Seton Hall; First Round	L 51–60	21–10	McKale Center; Tucson, Arizona
*Non-conference game. ^{#}Rankings from AP Poll. (#) Tournament seedings in parentheses. W=West. All times are in Central Time.
