= 1991–92 Southwest Missouri State Bears basketball team =

American college basketball season

1991–92 Southwest Missouri State Bears basketball

MVC tournament champions

NCAA tournament
- Conference: Missouri Valley Conference
- Record: 23–8 (13–5 MVC)
- Head coach: Charlie Spoonhour (9th season)
- Assistant coach: Bob Sundvold (1st season)
- Home arena: Hammons Student Center

1991–92 Missouri Valley Conference men's basketball standings
	Conf.				Overall
Team	W		L	PCT	W		L	PCT
Southern Illinois	14	–	4	.778	22	–	8	.733
Illinois State	14	–	4	.778	18	–	11	.621
Southwest Missouri State †	13	–	5	.722	23	–	8	.742
Indiana State	12	–	6	.667	13	–	15	.464
Tulsa	12	–	6	.667	17	–	13	.567
Creighton	7	–	11	.389	9	–	19	.321
Northern Iowa	6	–	12	.333	10	–	18	.357
Wichita State	6	–	12	.333	8	–	20	.286
Drake	3	–	15	.167	6	–	21	.222
Bradley	3	–	15	.167	7	–	23	.233
† 1992 MVC tournament winner Rankings from AP Poll

The 1991–92 Southwest Missouri State Bears basketball team represented Southwest Missouri State University in National Collegiate Athletic Association (NCAA) Division I men's basketball during the 1991–92 season. Playing in the Missouri Valley Conference and led by head coach Charlie Spoonhour, the Bears finished the season with a 23–8 overall record and finished third in the MVC regular season standings. After winning the MVC tournament to gain an automatic bid to the NCAA tournament, Southwest Missouri State lost to Michigan State in the opening round.

== Roster ==
1991–92 Missouri State Bears men's basketball team
Players
Coaches

Pos.	#	Name	Height	Weight	Year	Hometown
G		Jackie Crawford	5 ft 7 in (1.7 m)	—	Jr
F		Tony Graves	6 ft 8 in (2.03 m)	—	Jr
G		Johnny Murdock	6 ft 1 in (1.85 m)	—	Fr

Head coach

- Charlie Spoonhour (Ozarks)

Assistant coach(es)

- Bob Sundvold (South Dakota State)

Legend

- (C) Team captain
- (S) Suspended
- (I) Ineligible
- (W) Walk-on
- Injured
- Current redshirt

== Schedule and results ==
Date time, TV	Rank^{#}	Opponent^{#}	Result	Record	Site city, state
Exhibition
Nov 16, 1991*		Arkansas Express	W 66–61	–	Hammons Student Center (7,627); Springfield, Missouri
Nov 19, 1991*		TTL Bamberg	W 69–45	–	Hammons Student Center (6,584); Springfield, Missouri
Regular season
Nov 23, 1991*		Augustana (IL)	W 81–55	1–0	Hammons Student Center (7,935); Springfield, Missouri
Nov 26, 1991*		Arkansas State	W 70–69 ^{OT}	2–0	Hammons Student Center (8,331); Springfield, Missouri
Dec 6, 1991*		Morgan State; Pizza Hut Classic	W 97–51	3–0	Hammons Student Center (7,298); Springfield, Missouri
Dec 7, 1991*		San Diego; Pizza Hut Classic	W 70–63	4–0	Hammons Student Center (7,557); Springfield, Missouri
Dec 11, 1991*		UMKC	W 77–64	5–0	Hammons Student Center; Springfield, Missouri
Missouri Valley Conference tournament
Mar 7, 1992*		vs. Creighton; Quarterfinals	W 75–69	21–7	St. Louis Arena; St. Louis, Missouri
Mar 8, 1992*		vs. Illinois State; Semifinals	W 61–58 ^{OT}	22–7	St. Louis Arena; St. Louis, Missouri
Mar 9, 1992*		at Tulsa; Championship Game	W 71–68	23–7	St. Louis Arena; St. Louis, Missouri
NCAA tournament
Mar 20, 1992*	(12 MW)	vs. (5 MW) No. 14 Michigan State; First Round	L 54–61	23–8	University of Dayton Arena; Dayton, Ohio
*Non-conference game. ^{#}Rankings from AP Poll. (#) Tournament seedings in parentheses. MW=Midwest. All times are in Central Time.
