= Derek Thomas (basketball) =

American basketball player and coach

Biographical details
- Born: September 6, 1966 (age 60); Marshall, Texas, U.S.

Playing career
- 1984–1986: Johnson County CC
- 1986–1988: Missouri-St. Louis

Coaching career (HC unless noted)
- 1988–1989: Missouri-St. Louis (asst.)
- 1989–1991: Missouri State (asst.)
- 1991–1992: Saint Louis (asst.)
- 1992–1995: Christian Brothers
- 1995–1999: Saint Louis (asst.)
- 1999–2000: Minnesota (asst.)
- 2000: Illinois (asst.)
- 2000–2001: Atlanta Hawks (scout)
- 2001–2003: UNLV (asst.)
- 2003–2008: Western Illinois
- 2008–2012: Detroit (asst.)

Derek Thomas (born September 6, 1966) is an American former head men's basketball coach at Western Illinois University. His final record in five years with Western Illinois University was 40–104. He is the son of Hall of Fame Kansas City Chiefs defensive back Emmitt Thomas. Thomas has four children.

Derek was an Assistant Basketball coach at the University of Detroit Mercy until resigning in 2012.
