= 1989–90 Michigan Wolverines men's basketball team =

American college basketball season

1989–90 Michigan Wolverines men's basketball

NCAA tournament, Round of 32
- Conference: Big Ten Conference

Ranking
- Coaches: No. 15
- AP: No. 13
- Record: 23–8 (12–6 Big Ten)
- Head coach: Steve Fisher
- Assistant coaches: Mike Boyd; Brian Dutcher; Jay Smith
- MVP: Rumeal Robinson
- Captains: Terry Mills; Rumeal Robinson
- Home arena: Crisler Arena

1989–90 Big Ten Conference men's basketball standings
	Conf.				Overall
Team	W		L	PCT	W		L	PCT
No. 3 Michigan State	15	–	3	.833	28	–	6	.824
No. 10 Purdue	13	–	5	.722	22	–	8	.733
No. 13 Michigan	12	–	6	.667	23	–	8	.742
No. 18 Illinois	11	–	7	.611	21	–	8	.724
No. 20 Minnesota	11	–	7	.611	23	–	9	.719
Ohio State	10	–	8	.556	17	–	13	.567
Indiana	8	–	10	.444	18	–	11	.621
Wisconsin	4	–	14	.222	14	–	17	.452
Iowa	4	–	14	.222	12	–	16	.429
Northwestern	2	–	16	.111	9	–	19	.321
Rankings from AP Poll

The 1989–90 Michigan Wolverines men's basketball team represented the University of Michigan in intercollegiate college basketball during the 1989–90 season. The team played its home games in the Crisler Arena in Ann Arbor, Michigan, and was a member of the Big Ten Conference. Head coach Steve Fisher led the team to a third-place finish in the Big Ten Conference. The team earned the number three seed in the 1990 NCAA Division I men's basketball tournament. For the third consecutive year, the team was ranked every week of the season in the AP Poll, which expanded from a top twenty poll to a top twenty-five poll that year. It began the season at number four, ended at number thirteen and peaked at number three. and it ended the season ranked fifteenth in the final UPI Coaches' Poll.

Terry Mills and Rumeal Robinson served as team co-captains and shared team co-MVP honors. The team's leading scorers were Robinson (575 points), Mills (562 points), and Loy Vaught (480 points). The leading rebounders were Vaught (346), Mills (247), and Robinson (127).

Robinson earned consensus All-American recognition.

The team established the current Big Ten Conference single-game field goals made record against Iowa on March 10, 1990, when it made 55. The team earned numerous conference statistical championships. Loy Vaught won the rebounding championship for conference games with a 10.7 average and all games with an 11.2 average, while Robinson won the assists title for all games. This was the first year that the conference recognized both conference games and all games statistical champions.

Vaught also set the Michigan career field goal percentage record at 67.1%. The record would stand until 1998. On March 8, 1990, against Wisconsin, the team tied the school's February 21, 1987, single-game free throw percentage record by making all fifteen of its free throws, a mark that has only been outdone by the March 2, 2002 16-for-16 performance. Robinson set the current school career assist average of 5.75 per game, surpassing Gary Grant's 1988 mark. Loy Vaught ended his career with 135 games played, which surpassed Glen Rice's 1989 school record of 134 games to establish the record. In 2012, Stu Douglass finished his career with 136 games.

In the 64-team NCAA Division I men's basketball tournament, number three seeded Michigan advanced one round by defeating the fourteen-seeded Illinois State 76–70 before losing to the eleven-seeded Loyola Marymount 149–115. The March 18, 1990 264-point contest with Loyola Marymount stands as the highest scoring single game in NCAA tournament history. It is also the highest combined total in Michigan history.

== Roster ==
1989–90 Michigan Wolverines men's basketball team
Players
Coaches

Pos.	#	Name	Height	Weight	Year	Previous school	Hometown
G	13	Demetrius Calip	6 ft 1 in (1.85 m)	165 lb (75 kg)	Jr	Flint Northern	Flint, MI
G	21	Rumeal Robinson	6 ft 2 in (1.88 m)	195 lb (88 kg)	Sr	Cambridge Rindge and Latin	Cambridge, MA
F	24	Sean Higgins	6 ft 9 in (2.06 m)	195 lb (88 kg)	Jr	Fairfax	Los Angeles, CA
G	25	Rob Pelinka	6 ft 5 in (1.96 m)	200 lb (91 kg)	RS Fr	Lake Forest	Lake Bluff, IL
F	35	Loy Vaught	6 ft 9 in (2.06 m)	225 lb (102 kg)	RS Sr	East Kentwood	Grand Rapids, MI
C	42	Eric Riley	7 ft 0 in (2.13 m)	230 lb (104 kg)	Fr	St. Joseph	Cleveland, OH
F	52	Terry Mills	6 ft 10 in (2.08 m)	230 lb (104 kg)	Sr	Romulus	Romulus, MI

Head coach

- Steve Fisher

Assistant coach(es)

Legend

- (C) Team captain
- (S) Suspended
- (I) Ineligible
- (W) Walk-on
- Injured
- Current redshirt

== Regular season ==
Date time, TV	Rank^{#}	Opponent^{#}	Result	Record	Site city, state
Regular Season
November 25, 1989*	No. 4	vs. No. 6 Arizona; Hall of Fame Tipoff Classic	L 75–82	0–1	MassMutual Center; Springfield, Massachusetts
November 27, 1989*	No. 10	at Boston University	W 73–65	1–1	Case Gym; Boston, Massachusetts
November 29, 1989*	No. 10	Grambling State	W 85–70	2–1	Crisler Arena; Ann Arbor, Michigan
December 2, 1989*	No. 10	Iowa State	W 101–78	3–1	Crisler Arena; Ann Arbor, Michigan
December 6, 1989*	No. 8	Central Michigan	W 100–51	4–1	Crisler Arena; Ann Arbor, Michigan
December 9, 1989*	No. 8	No. 6 Duke	W 113–108 ^{OT}	5–1	Crisler Arena; Ann Arbor, Michigan
December 11, 1989*	No. 6	Chicago State	W 84–57	6–1	Crisler Arena; Ann Arbor, Michigan
December 16, 1989*	No. 6	at Marquette	W 82–73	7–1	Bradley Center; Milwaukee, Wisconsin
December 23, 1989*	No. 6	vs. Seton Hall	W 91–86	8–1	Thomas & Mack Center; Las Vegas, Nevada
December 30, 1989*	No. 5	Eastern Michigan	W 103–83	9–1	Crisler Arena; Ann Arbor, Michigan
January 8, 1990	No. 3	at No. 13 Indiana	L 67–69	9–2 (0–1)	Assembly Hall; Bloomington, Indiana
January 13, 1990	No. 3	No. 16 Minnesota	W 87–83	10–2 (1–1)	Crisler Arena; Ann Arbor, Michigan
January 15, 1990	No. 6	at No. 7 Illinois	W 74–70	11–2 (2–1)	Assembly Hall; Champaign, Illinois
January 18, 1990	No. 6	Ohio State	W 90–88	12–2 (3–1)	Crisler Arena; Ann Arbor, Michigan
January 20, 1990	No. 6	at Iowa	L 76–78	12–3 (3–2)	Carver-Hawkeye Arena; Iowa City, Iowa
January 25, 1990	No. 7	at Northwestern	W 86–79	13–3 (4–2)	Welsh-Ryan Arena; Evanston, Illinois
January 27, 1990	No. 7	Michigan State	W 65–63	14–3 (5–2)	Crisler Arena; Ann Arbor, Michigan
January 31, 1990	No. 4	No. 8 Purdue	L 73–91	14–4 (5–3)	Crisler Arena; Ann Arbor, Michigan
February 3, 1990	No. 4	at Wisconsin	W 77–63	15–4 (6–3)	Wisconsin Field House; Madison, Wisconsin
February 8, 1990	No. 7	No. 25 Indiana	W 79–71	16–4 (7–3)	Crisler Arena; Ann Arbor, Michigan
February 11, 1990	No. 7	No. 12 Illinois	W 93–79	17–4 (8–3)	Crisler Arena; Ann Arbor, Michigan
February 15, 1990	No. 5	at No. 17 Minnesota	W 77–73	18–4 (9–3)	Williams Arena; Minneapolis, Minnesota
February 18, 1990	No. 5	at Ohio State	L 61–64	18–5 (9–4)	St. John Arena; Columbus, Ohio
February 24, 1990	No. 7	Northwestern	W 94–69	19–5 (10–4)	Crisler Arena; Ann Arbor, Michigan
March 1, 1990	No. 8	at No. 14 Michigan State	L 70–78	19–6 (10–5)	Jenison Fieldhouse; East Lansing, Michigan
March 4, 1990	No. 8	at No. 9 Purdue	L 77–79	19–7 (10–6)	Mackey Arena; West Lafayette, Indiana
March 8, 1990	No. 13	Wisconsin	W 94–64	20–7 (11–6)	Crisler Arena; Ann Arbor, Michigan
March 11, 1990	No. 13	Iowa	W 127–96	21–7 (12–6)	Crisler Arena; Ann Arbor, Michigan
NCAA Tournament
March 16, 1990*	(3 W) No. 13	(14 W) Illinois State; First Round	W 76–70	22–7	Long Beach Arena; Long Beach, California
March 18, 1990*	(3 W) No. 13	(11 W) No. 21 Loyola Marymount; Second Round	L 115–149	22–8	Long Beach Arena; Long Beach, California
*Non-conference game. ^{#}Rankings from AP poll. (#) Tournament seedings in parentheses. SE=Southeast.

== Rankings ==
Ranking movements Legend: ██ Increase in ranking ██ Decrease in ranking
	Week																
Poll	Pre	1	2	3	4	5	6	7	8	9	10	11	12	13	14	15	Final
AP Poll	4	10	8	6	6	5	5	3	6	7	4	7	5	7	8	13	13

== Team players drafted into the NBA ==
Five players from this team were selected in the NBA draft.

Year	Round	Pick	Overall	Player	NBA club
1990	1	10	10	Rumeal Robinson	Atlanta Hawks
1990	1	13	13	Loy Vaught	Los Angeles Clippers
1990	1	16	16	Terry Mills	Milwaukee Bucks
1990	2	27	54	Sean Higgins	San Antonio Spurs
1993	2	6	33	Eric Riley	Dallas Mavericks

== See also ==
- Michigan Wolverines men's basketball
- 1990 NCAA Division I men's basketball tournament
- NCAA Men's Division I tournament bids by school
- NCAA Men's Division I tournament bids by school and conference
- NCAA Division I men's basketball tournament all-time team records
