= 1989–90 Ohio State Buckeyes men's basketball team =

American college basketball season

1989–90 Ohio State Buckeyes men's basketball

NCAA men's Division I tournament, second round
- Conference: Big Ten
- Record: 17–13 (10–8 Big Ten)
- Head coach: Randy Ayers (1st season)
- Home arena: St. John Arena

1989–90 Big Ten Conference men's basketball standings
	Conf.				Overall
Team	W		L	PCT	W		L	PCT
No. 3 Michigan State	15	–	3	.833	28	–	6	.824
No. 10 Purdue	13	–	5	.722	22	–	8	.733
No. 13 Michigan	12	–	6	.667	23	–	8	.742
No. 18 Illinois	11	–	7	.611	21	–	8	.724
No. 20 Minnesota	11	–	7	.611	23	–	9	.719
Ohio State	10	–	8	.556	17	–	13	.567
Indiana	8	–	10	.444	18	–	11	.621
Wisconsin	4	–	14	.222	14	–	17	.452
Iowa	4	–	14	.222	12	–	16	.429
Northwestern	2	–	16	.111	9	–	19	.321
Rankings from AP Poll

The 1989–90 Ohio State Buckeyes men's basketball team represented Ohio State University as a member of the Big Ten Conference during the 1989–90 NCAA men's college basketball season. The Buckeyes finished with an overall record of 17–13 (10–8 Big Ten) and received an at-large bid to the NCAA tournament. After defeating Providence, 84–83 in OT, in the opening round, Ohio State lost to eventual national champion UNLV, 76–65, in the second round.

== Roster ==
1989–90 Ohio State Buckeyes men's basketball team
Players
Coaches

Pos.	#	Name	Height	Weight	Year	Hometown
G	3	Mark Baker	6 ft 1 in (1.85 m)	180 lb (82 kg)	Fr	Dayton, Ohio
G	20	Alex Davis	6 ft 1 in (1.85 m)	170 lb (77 kg)	Fr	Cincinnati, Ohio
SF	21	Chris Jent	6 ft 7 in (2.01 m)	215 lb (98 kg)	So	Sparta, New Jersey
SG	22	Jim Jackson	6 ft 6 in (1.98 m)	220 lb (100 kg)	Fr	Toledo, Ohio
G	30	Jamaal Brown	6 ft 4 in (1.93 m)	190 lb (86 kg)	So	Arlington, Texas
F	31	Dave Liar	6 ft 7 in (2.01 m)	220 lb (100 kg)	So	Elida, Ohio
C	32	Perry Carter	6 ft 8 in (2.03 m)	230 lb (104 kg)	Jr	Washington, D.C.
F	34	Treg Lee	6 ft 8 in (2.03 m)	220 lb (100 kg)	Jr	Cleveland, Ohio
			—	—
C	54	Bill Robinson	7 ft 0 in (2.13 m)	245 lb (111 kg)	So	Canton, Ohio

Head coach

- Randy Ayers (Miami (OH))

Assistant coach(es)

Legend

- (C) Team captain
- (S) Suspended
- (I) Ineligible
- (W) Walk-on
- Injured
- Current redshirt

== Schedule and results ==
Date time, TV	Rank^{#}	Opponent^{#}	Result	Record	Site city, state
Regular Season
Nov 15, 1989*		at DePaul	L 53–71	0–1	Rosemont Horizon; Rosemont, Illinois
Nov 27, 1989*		Mount St. Mary's	W 102–63	1–1	St. John Arena; Columbus, Ohio
Dec 1, 1989*		vs. No. 25 NC State; Tournament of Champions	L 54–68	1–2	Charlotte, North Carolina
Dec 2, 1989*		vs. No. 23 Oklahoma State; Tournament of Champions	L 59–81	1–3	Charlotte, North Carolina
Dec 9, 1989*		American	W 74–64	2–3	St. John Arena; Columbus, Ohio
Dec 18, 1989*		Robert Morris	W 78–51	3–3	St. John Arena; Columbus, Ohio
Dec 21, 1989*		South Carolina	W 59–46	4–3	St. John Arena; Columbus, Ohio
Dec 27, 1989*		vs. No. 20 La Salle; Sugar Bowl Classic	L 62–74	4–4	Louisiana Superdome; New Orleans, Louisiana
Dec 28, 1989*		at New Orleans	W 74–66	5–4	Lakefront Arena; New Orleans, Louisiana
Jan 4, 1990		No. 9 Indiana	W 69–67	6–4 (1–0)	St. John Arena; Columbus, Ohio
Jan 6, 1990		at No. 20 Iowa	W 79–73	7–4 (2–0)	Carver-Hawkeye Arena; Iowa City, Iowa
Jan 11, 1990		at Michigan State	L 68–78	7–5 (2–1)	Breslin Center; East Lansing, Michigan
Jan 13, 1990		Wisconsin	W 68–53	8–5 (3–1)	St. John Arena; Columbus, Ohio
Jan 18, 1990		at No. 6 Michigan	L 88–90	8–6 (3–2)	Crisler Arena; Ann Arbor, Michigan
Jan 20, 1990		at No. 22 Minnesota	L 78–83	8–7 (3–3)	Williams Arena; Minneapolis, Minnesota
Jan 25, 1990		No. 13 Purdue	L 66–78	8–8 (3–4)	St. John Arena; Columbus, Ohio
Jan 27, 1990		at No. 10 Illinois	L 81–92	8–9 (3–5)	Assembly Hall; Champaign, Illinois
Feb 1, 1990		Northwestern	W 101–77	9–9 (4–5)	St. John Arena; Columbus, Ohio
Feb 4, 1990*		No. 10 Louisville	W 91–88	10–9	St. John Arena; Columbus, Ohio
Feb 8, 1990		Iowa	W 98–80	11–9 (5–5)	St. John Arena; Columbus, Ohio
Feb 10, 1990		No. 23 Michigan State	L 75–84	11–10 (5–6)	St. John Arena; Columbus, Ohio
Feb 15, 1990		at Wisconsin	W 68–58	12–10 (6–6)	Wisconsin Field House; Madison, Wisconsin
Feb 18, 1990		No. 5 Michigan	W 64–61	13–10 (7–6)	St. John Arena; Columbus, Ohio
Feb 24, 1990		at No. 9 Purdue	L 70–75	13–11 (7–7)	Mackey Arena; West Lafayette, Indiana
Feb 26, 1990		No. 18 Illinois	W 86–80	14–11 (8–7)	St. John Arena; Columbus, Ohio
Mar 3, 1990		at Northwestern	W 95–86	15–11 (9–7)	Welsh-Ryan Arena; Evanston, Illinois
Mar 8, 1990		at Indiana	L 66–77	15–12 (9–8)	Assembly Hall; Bloomington, Indiana
Mar 10, 1990		No. 19 Minnesota	W 93–83	16–12 (10–8)	St. John Arena; Columbus, Ohio
NCAA tournament
Mar 15, 1990*	(8 W)	vs. (9 W) Providence; First Round	W 84–83 ^{OT}	17–12	Jon M. Huntsman Center; Salt Lake City, Utah
Mar 17, 1990*	(8 W)	vs. (1 W) No. 2 UNLV; Second Round	L 65–76	17–13	Jon M. Huntsman Center; Salt Lake City, Utah
*Non-conference game. ^{#}Rankings from AP Poll. (#) Tournament seedings in parentheses. W=West.
