= 1989–90 Wisconsin Badgers men's basketball team =

American college basketball season

1989–90 Wisconsin Badgers men's basketball
- Conference: Big Ten Conference
- Record: 14–17 (4–14 Big Ten)
- Head coach: Steve Yoder (8th season)
- Home arena: Wisconsin Field House

1989–90 Big Ten Conference men's basketball standings
	Conf.				Overall
Team	W		L	PCT	W		L	PCT
No. 3 Michigan State	15	–	3	.833	28	–	6	.824
No. 10 Purdue	13	–	5	.722	22	–	8	.733
No. 13 Michigan	12	–	6	.667	23	–	8	.742
No. 18 Illinois	11	–	7	.611	21	–	8	.724
No. 20 Minnesota	11	–	7	.611	23	–	9	.719
Ohio State	10	–	8	.556	17	–	13	.567
Indiana	8	–	10	.444	18	–	11	.621
Wisconsin	4	–	14	.222	14	–	17	.452
Iowa	4	–	14	.222	12	–	16	.429
Northwestern	2	–	16	.111	9	–	19	.321
Rankings from AP Poll

The 1989–90 Wisconsin Badgers men's basketball team represented the University of Wisconsin as a member of the Big Ten Conference during the 1989–90 NCAA Division I men's basketball season. The team was coached by Steve Yoder, in his eighth season with Wisconsin. The Badgers finished 14–17, 4–14 in Big Ten play to finish in eighth place.

== Offseason ==
Yoder's top assistant Brad McNulty, suspended without pay since August 1, 1989, was fired just prior to his eighth season at Wisconsin for billing personal phone calls to the university from January 1988 to May 1989. McNulty made 51 calls to Nevada hotel casinos, which cost the university over $2,000 and resulted in a felony charge.

== Roster ==
1989–90 Wisconsin Badgers men's basketball team
Players
Coaches

Pos.	#	Name	Height	Weight	Year	Hometown
G	4	Larry Hisle, Jr.	6 ft 4 in (1.93 m)	185 lb (84 kg)	Fr	Mequon, WI
G	5	Jason Johnsen (redshirt)	6 ft 3 in (1.91 m)	185 lb (84 kg)	Fr	New Hope, MN
G	10	Billy Douglass	6 ft 5 in (1.96 m)	185 lb (84 kg)	RS So	Lake Forest, IL
G	12	Brian Good	6 ft 1 in (1.85 m)	180 lb (82 kg)	So	Rossville, IN
G	20	Byron Robinson	6 ft 5 in (1.96 m)	185 lb (84 kg)	RS Jr	Springfield, IL
G/F	23	Willie Simms	6 ft 5 in (1.96 m)	185 lb (84 kg)	Jr	Pontiac, MI
F	32	Carlton McGee (redshirt)	6 ft 7 in (2.01 m)	200 lb (91 kg)	Fr	Milwaukee, WI
F	40	John Ellenson	6 ft 7 in (2.01 m)	210 lb (95 kg)	RS Jr	Menomonie, WI
F	33	Louis Ely (I)	6 ft 7 in (2.01 m)	180 lb (82 kg)	Fr	Harvey, IL
F	41	Damon Harrell	6 ft 8 in (2.03 m)	210 lb (95 kg)	Fr	Madison, WI
F	43	Patrick Tompkins	6 ft 6 in (1.98 m)	240 lb (109 kg)	Jr	Waukegan, IL
G	44	Tim Locum (C)	6 ft 4 in (1.93 m)	175 lb (79 kg)	Jr	Flora, IL
F	50	Danny Jones (C)	6 ft 6 in (1.98 m)	240 lb (109 kg)	Sr	Rockford, IL
C	52	Grant Johnson (redshirt)	7 ft 0 in (2.13 m)	230 lb (104 kg)	Fr	Plymouth, MN
F/C	53	Kurt Portmann (C)	6 ft 11 in (2.11 m)	225 lb (102 kg)	Sr	Sheboygan, WI

Head coach

- Steve Yoder (Illinois Wesleyan)

Assistant coach(es)

- Ray McCallum (Ball State)
- Jonathan Williams (Ball State)
- Charles Schramm (Northern Illinois)

Legend

- (C) Team captain
- (S) Suspended
- (I) Ineligible
- (W) Walk-on
- Injured
- Current redshirt

== Schedule ==
Date time, TV	Rank^{#}	Opponent^{#}	Result	Record	Site city, state
Regular season
11/24/1989*		vs. Eastern Michigan; San Juan Shootout	L 52–71	0–1	Roberto Clemente Coliseum; San Juan, PR
11/25/1989*		vs. Western Kentucky; San Juan Shootout	W 73–62	1–1	Roberto Clemente Coliseum; San Juan, PR
11/26/1989*		vs. Bradley; San Juan Shootout	W 63–57	2–1	Roberto Clemente Coliseum; San Juan, PR
11/28/1989*		North Dakota State	W 81–55	3–1	UW Fieldhouse; Madison, WI
12/1/1989*		vs. Gonzaga; First Bank Classic	W 63–58	4–1	Bradley Center; Milwaukee, WI
12/2/1989*		vs. Marquette; First Bank Classic	W 63–58 ^{OT}	5–1	Bradley Center; Milwaukee, WI
12/4/1989*		at Washington State	L 52–55	5–2	Beasley Coliseum; Pullman, WA
12/7/1989*		Western Illinois	W 69–42	6–2	UW Fieldhouse; Madison, WI
12/9/1989*		Butler	W 75–59	7–2	UW Fieldhouse; Madison, WI
12/15/1989*		Rollins	W 68–46	8–2	UW Fieldhouse; Madison, WI
12/28/1989*		vs. Georgia; Tribune Classic	L 64–65	8–3	ASU Activity Center; Tempe, AZ
12/29/1989*		vs. Manhattan; Tribune Classic	W 63–48	9–3	ASU Activity Center; Tempe, AZ
1/4/1990		at No. 4 Illinois	L 59–73	9–4 (0–1)	Assembly Hall; Champaign, IL
1/6/1990		Michigan State	L 61–64	9–5 (0–2)	UW Fieldhouse; Madison, WI
1/11/1990		Iowa	W 73–69 ^{OT}	10–5 (1–2)	UW Fieldhouse; Madison, WI
1/13/1990		at Ohio State	L 53–68	10–6 (1–3)	St. John Arena; Columbus, OH
1/17/1990		No. 24 Purdue	L 54–56	10–7 (1–4)	UW Fieldhouse; Madison, WI
1/22/1990		No. 21 Minnesota	W 77–75	11–7 (2–4)	UW Fieldhouse; Madison, WI
1/25/1990		No. 10 Illinois	L 63–66	11–8 (2–5)	UW Fieldhouse; Madison, WI
1/27/1990		at Northwestern	L 85–87	11–9 (2–6)	Welsh–Ryan Arena; Evanston, IL
2/1/1990		at No. 22 Indiana	L 61–85	11–10 (2–7)	Assembly Hall; Bloomington, IN
2/3/1990		No. 4 Michigan	L 63–77	11–11 (2–8)	UW Fieldhouse; Madison, WI
2/8/1990		at No. 23 Michigan State	L 57–60	11–12 (2–9)	Breslin Center; East Lansing, MI
2/10/1990		at Iowa	W 80–71	12–12 (3–9)	Carver–Hawkeye Arena; Iowa City, IA
2/15/1990		Ohio State	L 58–68	12–13 (3–10)	UW Fieldhouse; Madison, WI
2/17/1990		at No. 12 Purdue	L 55–62	12–14 (3–11)	Mackey Arena; West Lafayette, IN
2/19/1990*		Marquette	W 82–65	13–14	UW Fieldhouse; Madison, WI
2/22/1990		at No. 18 Minnesota	L 67–68	13–15 (3–12)	Williams Arena; Minneapolis, MN
3/1/1990		Northwestern	W 65–60	14–15 (4–12)	UW Fieldhouse; Madison, WI
3/3/1990		Indiana	L 68–70	14–16 (4–13)	UW Fieldhouse; Madison, WI
3/8/1990		at No. 13 Michigan	L 64–94	14–17 (4–14)	Crisler Arena; Ann Arbor, MI
*Non-conference game. ^{#}Rankings from AP Poll. (#) Tournament seedings in parentheses.

== Player statistics ==
Individual player statistics (final)
			Minutes		Scoring		Total FGs			3-point FGs			Free throws			Rebounds								
Player	GP	GS	Tot	Avg	Pts	Avg	FG	FGA	Pct	3FG	3FA	Pct	FT	FTA	Pct	Off	Def	Tot	Avg	A	TO	Blk	Stl	PF
Jones, Danny	31	31	1043	33.6	548	17.7	215	412	.522	0	4	.000	118	188	.628	-	-	140	4.5	26	68	15	20	91
Simms, Willie	30	30	970	32.3	400	13.3	153	284	.539	2	6	.333	92	146	.630	-	-	145	4.8	97	99	11	33	85
Locum, Tim	30	19	792	26.4	295	9.8	94	194	.485	67	143	.469	40	45	.889	-	-	69	2.3	67	35	0	33	61
Tompkins, Patrick	28	19	719	25.7	186	6.6	73	146	.500	0	2	.000	40	80	.500	-	-	178	6.4	29	56	10	17	67
Good, Brian	30	5	471	15.7	170	5.7	41	111	.369	31	81	.383	57	63	.905	-	-	21	0.7	37	25	0	12	35
Hisle, Larry	31	12	516	16.6	141	4.5	46	126	.365	17	52	.327	32	46	.696	-	-	44	1.4	33	46	7	18	48
Portmann, Kurt	31	16	652	21.0	115	3.7	53	127	.417	0	2	.000	9	25	.360	-	-	134	4.3	37	42	30	24	77
Douglass, Billy	31	17	525	16.9	86	2.8	32	72	.444	9	19	.474	13	18	.722	-	-	41	1.3	65	41	1	17	49
Ellenson, John	30	6	368	12.3	58	1.9	26	54	.481	1	2	.500	5	17	.294	-	-	57	1.9	39	18	4	12	32
Robinson, Byron	9	0	71	7.9	12	1.3	3	8	.375	0	0	.000	6	6	1.000	-	-	13	1.4	11	7	0	3	13
Harrell, Damon	19	0	123	6.5	20	1.1	8	24	.333	0	0	.000	4	8	.500	-	-	19	1.0	4	11	0	6	11
Total	31	-	6250	40.3	2031	65.5	744	1558	.478	121	311	.408	416	642	.648	-	-	933	30.1	445	450	78	195	569
Opponents	31	-	6250	40.3	2004	64.6	721	1591	.453	117	313	.374	445	622	.715	-	-	951	30.7	363	440	59	189	580

Legend
GP	Games played	GS	Games started	Tot	Total count	Avg	Average per game	Pts	Points
FG	Field goals made	FGA	Field goal attempts	3FG	3-pointers made	3FA	3-point attempts	FT	Free throws made
FTA	Free throw attempts	Off	Offensive rebounds	Def	Defensive rebounds	A	Assists	TO	Turnovers
Blk	Blocks	Stl	Steals	PF	Personal fouls	Team high

== Awards and honors ==
Danny Jones was named Second Team All-Big Ten by the media at the conclusion of the season.
