= 1989–90 Indiana Hoosiers men's basketball team =

American college basketball season

1989–90 Indiana Hoosiers men's basketball

NCAA men's Division I tournament, Round of 64
- Conference: Big Ten Conference
- Record: 18–11 (8–10 Big Ten)
- Head coach: Bobby Knight (19th season)
- Captain: Jeff Oliphant
- Home arena: Assembly Hall

1989–90 Big Ten Conference men's basketball standings
	Conf.				Overall
Team	W		L	PCT	W		L	PCT
No. 3 Michigan State	15	–	3	.833	28	–	6	.824
No. 10 Purdue	13	–	5	.722	22	–	8	.733
No. 13 Michigan	12	–	6	.667	23	–	8	.742
No. 18 Illinois	11	–	7	.611	21	–	8	.724
No. 20 Minnesota	11	–	7	.611	23	–	9	.719
Ohio State	10	–	8	.556	17	–	13	.567
Indiana	8	–	10	.444	18	–	11	.621
Wisconsin	4	–	14	.222	14	–	17	.452
Iowa	4	–	14	.222	12	–	16	.429
Northwestern	2	–	16	.111	9	–	19	.321
Rankings from AP Poll

The 1989–90 Indiana Hoosiers men's basketball team represented Indiana University. Their head coach was Bobby Knight, who was in his 19th year. The team played its home games in Assembly Hall in Bloomington, Indiana, and was a member of the Big Ten Conference.

The Hoosiers finished the regular season with an overall record of 18–11 and a conference record of 8–10, finishing 7th in the Big Ten Conference. The Hoosiers were invited to participate in the 1990 NCAA tournament as an 8-seed; however, IU made a quick exit with a first-round loss to 9-seed California.

== Roster ==
No.	Name	Position	Ht.	Year	Hometown
4	Lyndon Jones	G	6–2	Jr.	Marion, Indiana
10	Mark Robinson	F	6–5	Sr.	Van Nuys, California
20	Greg Graham	G	6–4	Fr.	Indianapolis, Indiana
21	Chris Reynolds	G	6–1	Fr.	Peoria, Illinois
23	Jamal Meeks	G	6–1	So.	Freeport, Illinois
24	Matt Nover	F/C	6–8	Fr.	Chesterton, Indiana
30	Todd Leary	G	6–3	Fr.	Indianapolis, Indiana
32	Eric Anderson	F/C	6–9	So.	Chicago, Illinois
33	Pat Graham	G	6–5	Fr.	Floyds Knobs, Indiana
34	Lawrence Funderburke	F	6–8	Fr.	Columbus, Ohio
35	Jeff Oliphant	G	6–5	Sr.	Lyons, Indiana
40	Calbert Cheaney	G/F	6–7	Fr.	Evansville, Indiana
54	Chris Lawson	F/C	6–9	Fr.	Bloomington, Indiana

== Schedule/results ==
Date time, TV	Rank^{#}	Opponent^{#}	Result	Record	Site city, state
Regular season
11/25/1989*	No. 14	Miami (OH)	W 77–66	1–0	Assembly Hall; Bloomington, Indiana
11/28/1989*	No. 14	Kent State	W 79–68	2–0	Assembly Hall; Bloomington, Indiana
12/2/1989*	No. 14	vs. Kentucky; Indiana–Kentucky rivalry	W 71–69	3–0	Hoosier Dome; Indianapolis, Indiana
12/5/1989*	No. 14	No. 19 Notre Dame	W 81–72	4–0	Assembly Hall; Bloomington, Indiana
12/8/1989*	No. 14	South Alabama; Indiana Classic	W 96–67	5–0	Assembly Hall; Bloomingto, Indiana
12/9/1989*	No. 14	Long Beach State; Indiana Classic	W 92–75	6–0	Assembly Hall; Bloomington, Indiana
12/16/1989*	No. 11	at UTEP	W 69–66	7–0	Special Events Center; El Paso, Texas
12/23/1989*	No. 11	Iowa State	W 115–66	8–0	Assembly Hall; Bloomington, Indiana
12/27/1989*	No. 10	vs. Wichita State; Hoosier Classic	W 75–54	9–0	Market Square Arena; Indianapolis
12/28/1989*	No. 10	vs. Texas A&M; Hoosier Classic	W 94–66	10–0	Market Square Arena; Indianapolis
1/4/1990	No. 9	at Ohio State	L 67–69	10–1 (0–1)	St. John Arena; Columbus, Ohio
1/8/1990	No. 9	No. 5 Michigan	W 69–67	11–1 (1–1)	Assembly Hall; Bloomington, Indiana
1/11/1990	No. 13	at Northwestern	W 77–63	12–1 (2–1)	Welsh-Ryan Arena; Evanston, Illinois
1/13/1990	No. 13	Purdue; Rivalry	L 79–81	12–2 (2–2)	Assembly Hall; Bloomington, Indiana
1/18/1990	No. 14	at Iowa	W 83–79	13–2 (3–2)	Carver–Hawkeye Arena; Iowa City, Iowa
1/24/1990	No. 12	Michigan State	L 57–75	13–3 (3–3)	Assembly Hall; Bloomington, Indiana
1/28/1990	No. 12	at No. 21 Minnesota	L 89–108	13–4 (3–4)	Williams Arena; Minneapolis
2/1/1990	No. 22	Wisconsin	W 85–61	14–4 (4–4)	Assembly Hall; Bloomington, Indiana
2/4/1990	No. 22	at No. 11 Illinois; Rivalry	L 65–70	14–5 (4–5)	Assembly Hall; Champaign, Illinois
2/8/1990	No. 25	at No. 7 Michigan	L 71–79	14–6 (4–6)	Crisler Arena; Ann Arbor, Michigan
2/10/1990	No. 25	Northwestern	W 98–75	15–6 (5–6)	Assembly Hall; Bloomington, Indiana
2/17/1990		Iowa	W 118–71	16–6 (6–6)	Assembly Hall; Bloomington, Indiana
2/19/1990		at No. 12 Purdue; Rivalry	L 49–72	16–7 (6–7)	Mackey Arena; West Lafayette, Indiana
2/25/1990	No. 25	at No. 15 Michigan State	L 66–72	16–8 (6–8)	Breslin Center; East Lansing, Michigan
3/1/1990		No. 17 Minnesota	L 70–75	16–9 (6–9)	Assembly Hall; Bloomington, Indiana
3/3/1990		at Wisconsin	W 70–68	17–9 (7–9)	Wisconsin Field House; Madison, Wisconsin
3/8/1990		Ohio State	W 77–66	18–9 (8–9)	Assembly Hall; Bloomington, Indiana
3/10/1990		No. 20 Illinois; Rivalry	L 63–69	18–10 (8–10)	Assembly Hall; Bloomington, IN
NCAA tournament
3/15/1990*	No. (8)	vs. No. (9) California; First Round	L 63–65	18–11 (8–10)	Hartford Civic Center; Hartford, Connecticut
*Non-conference game. ^{#}Rankings from AP Poll. (#) Tournament seedings in parentheses.
