= 1989–90 Illinois Fighting Illini men's basketball team =

American college basketball season

1989–90 Illinois Fighting Illini men's basketball

Illini Classic, Champion Old Style Classic, Champion

NCAA men's Division I tournament, first round
- Conference: Big Ten Conference

Ranking
- Coaches: No. 18
- AP: No. 18
- Record: 21–8 (11–7 Big Ten)
- Head coach: Lou Henson (15th season)
- Assistant coaches: Dick Nagy (11th season); Jimmy Collins (7th season); Mark Coomes (5th season)
- MVP: Kendall Gill
- Captains: Kendall Gill; Stephen Bardo
- Home arena: Assembly Hall

1989–90 Big Ten Conference men's basketball standings
	Conf.				Overall
Team	W		L	PCT	W		L	PCT
No. 3 Michigan State	15	–	3	.833	28	–	6	.824
No. 10 Purdue	13	–	5	.722	22	–	8	.733
No. 13 Michigan	12	–	6	.667	23	–	8	.742
No. 18 Illinois	11	–	7	.611	21	–	8	.724
No. 20 Minnesota	11	–	7	.611	23	–	9	.719
Ohio State	10	–	8	.556	17	–	13	.567
Indiana	8	–	10	.444	18	–	11	.621
Wisconsin	4	–	14	.222	14	–	17	.452
Iowa	4	–	14	.222	12	–	16	.429
Northwestern	2	–	16	.111	9	–	19	.321
Rankings from AP Poll

The 1989–90 Illinois Fighting Illini men's basketball team represented the University of Illinois.

== Regular season ==
Coming off the Final Four season a year earlier, Illinois went 21–8 overall, 11–7 in the Big Ten in 1990. Kendall Gill, a senior, became the first player since Ken Norman in 1987 to average 20 points per game. Gill was named a First-Team All-American by UPI. Gill led the Big Ten in scoring and was a finalist for the John Wooden Player of the Year Award. He was the fifth overall pick in the NBA draft, going to the Charlotte Hornets.

=== Roster ===
1989–90 Illinois Fighting Illini men's basketball team
Players
Coaches

Pos.	#	Name	Height	Weight	Year	Previous school	Hometown
F	3	Tim Geers	6 ft 5 in (1.96 m)	195 lb (88 kg)	Fr	De La Salle High School	Chicago, Illinois
G	4	Brooks Taylor	6 ft 4 in (1.93 m)	170 lb (77 kg)	Fr	De La Salle High School	Chicago, Illinois
G	10	P.J. Bowman	5 ft 10 in (1.78 m)	175 lb (79 kg)	Sr	Champaign Centennial High School	Champaign, Illinois
G	12	Travis Smith	6 ft 1 in (1.85 m)	175 lb (79 kg)	Sr	Gallatin High School	Ridgway, Illinois
G	13	Kendall Gill (C)	6 ft 5 in (1.96 m)	195 lb (88 kg)	Sr	Rich Central High School	Matteson, Illinois
G	20	Ken Gibson	6 ft 2 in (1.88 m)	195 lb (88 kg)	Fr	Bloomington High School	Bloomington, Illinois
F/C	21	Rodney Jones	6 ft 7 in (2.01 m)	210 lb (95 kg)	Jr	West Philadelphia High School	Philadelphia, PA
G	23	Larry Smith (injured) (redshirt)	6 ft 4 in (1.93 m)	190 lb (86 kg)	Sr	Alton High School	Alton, Illinois
F	24	Ervin Small	6 ft 7 in (2.01 m)	222 lb (101 kg)	Sr	Simeon High School	Chicago, Illinois
F	25	Deon Thomas (redshirt)	6 ft 8 in (2.03 m)	200 lb (91 kg)	Fr	Simeon High School	Chicago, Illinois
G	30	Marcus Liberty	6 ft 8 in (2.03 m)	210 lb (95 kg)	Jr	King High School	Chicago, Illinois
F	32	Tom Michael (redshirt)	6 ft 8 in (2.03 m)	190 lb (86 kg)	Fr	Carlyle High School	Hoffman, Illinois
F	34	Andy Kaufmann	6 ft 6 in (1.98 m)	220 lb (100 kg)	So	Jacksonville High School	Jacksonville, Illinois
G/F	35	Stephen Bardo (C)	6 ft 6 in (1.98 m)	200 lb (91 kg)	Sr	Carbondale Community High School	Carbondale, Illinois
F	40	Matt Schnaderbeck	6 ft 5 in (1.96 m)	190 lb (86 kg)	So	Maine West High School	Des Plaines, Illinois
G/F	42	Brian O'Connell	6 ft 4 in (1.93 m)	195 lb (88 kg)	Sr	Schaumburg High School	Schaumburg, Illinois
C	50	Andy Kpedi	6 ft 7 in (2.01 m)	215 lb (98 kg)	Jr	Kankakee Community College	Warri, Nigeria

Head coach

- Lou Henson (New Mexico State University) (15th year)

Assistant coach(es)

- Jimmy Collins (New Mexico State) (7th year)
- Dick Nagy (Hardin-Simmons University) (11th year)
- Mark Coomes (New Mexico State) (5th year)

Legend

- (C) Team captain
- (S) Suspended
- (I) Ineligible
- (W) Walk-on
- Injured
- Current redshirt

Roster

== Schedule ==
Date time, TV	Rank^{#}	Opponent^{#}	Result	Record	Site (attendance) city, state
Non-Conference regular season
11/28/1989*	No. 8	at Mississippi	W 83-72	1-0	Tad Smith Coliseum (8,439); Oxford, Mississippi
12/2/1989*	No. 8	Chicago State	W 82-62	2-0	Assembly Hall (15,940); Champaign, Illinois
12/5/1989*	No. 7	at No. 25 Florida	W 74-69	3-0	O'Connell Center (11,929); Gainesville, Florida
12/8/1989*	No. 7	Indiana State; Illini Classic	W 93-59	4-0	Assembly Hall (16,111); Champaign, Illinois
12/9/1989*	No. 7	Metro State; Illini Classic	W 96-62	5-0	Assembly Hall (16,016); Champaign
12/16/1989*; ABC	No. 5	Temple	W 78-61	6-0	Assembly Hall (16,034); Champaign
12/20/1989*	No. 5	vs. No. 4 Missouri; Braggin' Rights	W 101-93	7-0	St. Louis Arena (18,398); St. Louis, Missouri
12/23/1989*	No. 5	Wisconsin-Green Bay	W 71-47	8-0	Assembly Hall (15,530); Champaign, Illinois
12/29/1989*	No. 4	vs. Grambling; Old Style Classic	W 97-73	9-0	Rosemont Horizon (10,009); Rosemont, Illinois
12/30/1989*	No. 4	vs. No. 15 Memphis State; Old Style Classic	W 83-71	10-0	Rosemont Horizon (13,103); Rosemont, Illinois
Big Ten regular season
1/4/1990	No. 4	Wisconsin	W 73-59	11-0 (1-0)	Assembly Hall (15,636); Champaign, Illinois
1/6/1990	No. 4	at Minnesota	L 74-91	11-1 (1-1)	Williams Arena (16,545); Minneapolis
1/13/1990	No. 8	at Northwestern; Rivalry	W 85-78	12-1 (2-1)	Welsh-Ryan Arena (8,117); Evanston, Illinois
1/15/1990; ESPN	No. 7	No. 6 Michigan	L 70-74	12-2 (2-2)	Assembly Hall (16,136); Champaign, Illinois
1/18/1990	No. 7	Michigan State	W 73-64	13-2 (3-2)	Assembly Hall (16,037); Champaign, Illinois
1/20/1990	No. 7	at No. 24 Purdue	L 68-81	13-3 (3-3)	Mackey Arena (14,123); West Lafayette, Indiana
1/25/1990	No. 10	at Wisconsin	W 66-63	14-3 (4-3)	Wisconsin Field House (11,666); Madison, Wisconsin
1/27/1990	No. 10	Ohio State	W 92-81	15-3 (5-3)	Assembly Hall (16,154); Champaign, Illinois
1/29/1990	No. 10	at Iowa; Rivalry	L 67-69	15-4 (5-4)	Carver–Hawkeye Arena (15,500); Iowa City, Iowa
2/4/1990	No. 11	No. 22 Indiana; Rivalry	W 70-65	16-4 (6-4)	Assembly Hall (16,289); Champaign, Illinois
2/8/1990	No. 12	No. 17 Minnesota	W 99-72	17-4 (7-4)	Assembly Hall (16,105); Champaign, Illinois
2/11/1990	No. 12	at No. 7 Michigan	L 79-93	17-5 (7-5)	Crisler Arena (13,609); Ann Arbor, Michigan
2/14/1990	No. 15	Northwestern; Rivalry	W 88-75	18-5 (8-5)	Assembly Hall (16,108); Champaign, Illinois
2/17/1990	No. 15	at No. 21 Michigan State	L 63-70	18-6 (8-6)	Breslin Student Events Center (15,138); East Lansing, Michigan
2/21/1990	No. 19	No. 9 Purdue	W 90-78	19-6 (9-6)	Assembly Hall (16,218); Champaign, Illinois
2/21/1990	No. 19	at Ohio State	L 80-86	19-7 (9-7)	St. John Arena (13,276); Columbus, Ohio
3/4/1990	No. 18	Iowa; Rivalry	W 118-85	20-7 (10-7)	Assembly Hall (16,219); Champaign, Illinois
3/11/1990	No. 20	at Indiana; Rivalry	W 69-63	21-7 (11-7)	Assembly Hall (17,228); Bloomington, Indiana
NCAA tournament
3/15/1990*	(5 MW) No. 18	vs. (12 MW) Dayton; First Round	L 86-88	21-8	Frank Erwin Center (11,578); Austin, Texas
*Non-conference game. ^{#}Rankings from AP Poll. (#) Tournament seedings in parentheses. All times are in Central Time.

== Player stats ==
Player	Games Played	Minutes Played	2 pt. Field Goals	3 pt. Field Goals	Free Throws	Rebounds	Assists	Blocks	Steals	Points
Kendall Gill	29	1000	188	23	136	143	96	16	63	581
Marcus Liberty	29	958	195	8	103	206	39	26	32	517
Andy Kaufmann	29	682	69	22	81	93	54	5	27	285
Steve Bardo	29	944	71	28	55	178	137	14	37	281
Rodney Jones	29	542	88	0	40	126	9	18	17	216
Ervin Small	29	577	74	1	49	151	12	5	23	200
P.J. Bowman	29	571	16	23	21	35	73	2	16	122
Andy Kpedi	19	201	17	0	20	54	2	11	4	54
Brooks Taylor	24	154	12	0	13	25	24	5	10	37
Ken Gibson	20	54	7	4	8	8	1	0	2	34
Tim Geers	20	104	11	0	11	19	9	1	5	33
Travis Smith	19	1	1	0	0	0	0	0	0	2

== Awards and honors ==
- Kendall Gill
  - Consensus 2nd team All-American
  - United Press International 1st team All-American
  - Associated Press 3rd team All-American
  - National Association of Basketball Coaches 3rd team All-American
  - Team Most Valuable Player
  - Fighting Illini All-Century team (2005)
- Deon Thomas
  - Fighting Illini All-Century team (2005)

== NCAA basketball tournament ==
- Midwest
  - Dayton 88, Illinois 86

== Team players drafted into the NBA ==
Player	NBA Club	Round	Pick
Kendall Gill	Charlotte Hornets	1	5
Stephen Bardo	Atlanta Hawks	2	41
Marcus Liberty	Denver Nuggets	2	42
