= 1989–90 Minnesota Golden Gophers men's basketball team =

American college basketball season

1989–90 Minnesota Golden Gophers men's basketball

NCAA tournament, Elite 8
- Conference: Big Ten Conference

Ranking
- AP: No. 20
- Record: 23–9 (11–7 Big Ten)
- Head coach: Clem Haskins (4th season)
- Home arena: Williams Arena

1989–90 Big Ten Conference men's basketball standings
	Conf.				Overall
Team	W		L	PCT	W		L	PCT
No. 3 Michigan State	15	–	3	.833	28	–	6	.824
No. 10 Purdue	13	–	5	.722	22	–	8	.733
No. 13 Michigan	12	–	6	.667	23	–	8	.742
No. 18 Illinois	11	–	7	.611	21	–	8	.724
No. 20 Minnesota	11	–	7	.611	23	–	9	.719
Ohio State	10	–	8	.556	17	–	13	.567
Indiana	8	–	10	.444	18	–	11	.621
Wisconsin	4	–	14	.222	14	–	17	.452
Iowa	4	–	14	.222	12	–	16	.429
Northwestern	2	–	16	.111	9	–	19	.321
Rankings from AP Poll

The 1989–90 Minnesota Golden Gophers men's basketball team represented the University of Minnesota during the 1989–90 NCAA Division I men's basketball season. Led by fourth-year head coach Clem Haskins, the Golden Gophers advanced to the Elite 8 of the NCAA tournament and finished with a 23–9 record (11–7 Big Ten).

== Roster ==
1989–90 Minnesota Golden Gophers men's basketball team
Players
Coaches

Pos.	#	Name	Height	Weight	Year	Hometown
G	3	Kevin Lynch	6 ft 5 in (1.96 m)	195 lb (88 kg)	Jr	Bloomington, Minnesota
G	20	Melvin Newbern	6 ft 4 in (1.93 m)	200 lb (91 kg)	Jr	Toledo, Ohio
F	33	Richard Coffey	6 ft 6 in (1.98 m)	210 lb (95 kg)	Sr	Aurora, North Carolina
F	34	Willie Burton	6 ft 8 in (2.03 m)	210 lb (95 kg)	Sr	Detroit, Michigan
G	40	Walter Bond	6 ft 5 in (1.96 m)	200 lb (91 kg)	Jr	Chicago, Illinois
F/C	45	Jim Shikenjanski	6 ft 9 in (2.06 m)	—	Sr
C		Bob Martin	7 ft 0 in (2.13 m)	250 lb (113 kg)	So

Head coach

- Clem Haskins (Western Kentucky)

Assistant coach(es)

Legend

- (C) Team captain
- (S) Suspended
- (I) Ineligible
- (W) Walk-on
- Injured
- Current redshirt

== Schedule/results ==
Date time, TV	Rank^{#}	Opponent^{#}	Result	Record	Site city, state
Regular season
Nov 25, 1989*		at Cincinnati	L 64–66	0–1	Myrl H. Shoemaker Center; Cincinnati, OH
Nov 28, 1989*		Chicago State	W 85–62	1–1	Williams Arena; Minneapolis, MN
Dec 2, 1989*		at Toledo	W 85–70	2–1	John F. Savage Hall; Toledo, OH
Dec 9, 1989*		Iowa State	W 98–82	3–1	Williams Arena; Minneapolis, MN
Dec 13, 1989*		at Detroit Mercy	W 89–61	4–1	Calihan Hall; Detroit, MI
Dec 16, 1989*		at Kansas State	W 69–68	5–1	Bramlage Coliseum; Manhattan, KS
Dec 20, 1989*		Washington	W 77–60	6–1	Williams Arena; Minneapolis, MN
Dec 23, 1989*		Northern Illinois	W 81–62	7–1	Williams Arena; Minneapolis, MN
Dec 30, 1989*	No. 25	Youngstown State	W 91–57	8–1	Williams Arena; Minneapolis, MN
Jan 3, 1990*	No. 24	Rider	W 116–48	9–1	Williams Arena; Minneapolis, MN
Jan 6, 1990	No. 24	No. 4 Illinois	W 91–74	10–1 (1–0)	Williams Arena; Minneapolis, MN
Jan 11, 1990	No. 16	at Purdue	L 78–86	10–2 (1–1)	Mackey Arena; West Lafayette, IN
Jan 13, 1990	No. 16	at No. 3 Michigan	L 83–87	10–3 (1–2)	Crisler Arena; Ann Arbor, MI
Jan 18, 1990	No. 22	Northwestern	W 97–75	11–3 (2–2)	Williams Arena; Minneapolis, MN
Jan 20, 1990	No. 22	Ohio State	W 83–78	12–3 (3–2)	Williams Arena; Minneapolis, MN
Jan 22, 1990	No. 21	at Wisconsin	L 75–77	12–4 (3–3)	Wisconsin Field House; Madison, WI
Jan 25, 1990	No. 21	Iowa	W 84–72	13–4 (4–3)	Williams Arena; Minneapolis, MN
Jan 28, 1990	No. 21	No. 12 Indiana	W 108–89	14–4 (5–3)	Williams Arena; Minneapolis, MN
Feb 1, 1990	No. 19	at Michigan State	W 79–74	15–4 (6–3)	Breslin Center; East Lansing, MI
Feb 8, 1990	No. 17	at No. 12 Illinois	L 72–99	15–5 (6–4)	Assembly Hall; Champaign, IL
Feb 11, 1990	No. 17	No. 10 Purdue	W 73–72	16–5 (7–4)	Williams Arena; Minneapolis, MN
Feb 15, 1990	No. 17	No. 5 Michigan	L 73–77	16–6 (7–5)	Williams Arena; Minneapolis, MN
Feb 17, 1990	No. 17	at Northwestern	W 90–72	17–6 (8–5)	Welsh-Ryan Arena; Evanston, IL
Feb 22, 1990	No. 18	Wisconsin	W 68–67	18–6 (9–5)	Williams Arena; Minneapolis, MN
Feb 24, 1990	No. 18	at Iowa	W 102–80	19–6 (10–5)	Carver-Hawkeye Arena; Iowa City, IA
Mar 1, 1990	No. 17	at Indiana	W 75–70	20–6 (11–5)	Assembly Hall; Bloomington, IN
Mar 3, 1990	No. 17	No. 14 Michigan State	L 73–75	20–7 (11–6)	Williams Arena; Minneapolis, MN
Mar 10, 1990	No. 19	at Ohio State	L 83–93	20–8 (11–7)	St. John Arena; Columbus, OH
NCAA Tournament
Mar 16, 1990; CBS	(6 SE) No. 20	vs. (11 SE) UTEP; First round	W 64–61 ^{OT}	21–8	Richmond Coliseum; Richmond, VA
Mar 18, 1990; CBS	(6 SE) No. 20	vs. (14 SE) Northern Iowa; Second Round	W 81–78	22–8	Richmond Coliseum; Richmond, VA
Mar 23, 1990; CBS	(6 SE) No. 20	vs. (2 SE) No. 6 Syracuse; Sweet Sixteen	W 82–75	23–8	Louisiana Superdome; New Orleans, LA
Mar 25, 1990; CBS	(6 SE) No. 20	vs. (4 SE) No. 9 Georgia Tech; Elite Eight	L 91–93	23–9	Louisiana Superdome; New Orleans, LA
*Non-conference game. ^{#}Rankings from AP Poll. (#) Tournament seedings in parentheses. SE=Southeast.

== NBA draft ==
Round	Pick	Player	NBA club
1	9	Willie Burton	Miami Heat
