= 1989–90 Purdue Boilermakers men's basketball team =

American college basketball season

1989–90 Purdue Boilermakers men's basketball

1990 NCAA Division I men's basketball tournament, second round
- Conference: Big Ten Conference

Ranking
- Coaches: No. 10
- AP: No. 10
- Record: 22–8 (13–5 Big Ten)
- Head coach: Gene Keady (10th season)
- Assistant coaches: Bruce Weber (10th season); Tom Reiter (4th season); Steve Lavin (2nd season)
- Home arena: Mackey Arena

1989–90 Big Ten Conference men's basketball standings
	Conf.				Overall
Team	W		L	PCT	W		L	PCT
No. 3 Michigan State	15	–	3	.833	28	–	6	.824
No. 10 Purdue	13	–	5	.722	22	–	8	.733
No. 13 Michigan	12	–	6	.667	23	–	8	.742
No. 18 Illinois	11	–	7	.611	21	–	8	.724
No. 20 Minnesota	11	–	7	.611	23	–	9	.719
Ohio State	10	–	8	.556	17	–	13	.567
Indiana	8	–	10	.444	18	–	11	.621
Wisconsin	4	–	14	.222	14	–	17	.452
Iowa	4	–	14	.222	12	–	16	.429
Northwestern	2	–	16	.111	9	–	19	.321
Rankings from AP Poll

The 1989–90 Purdue Boilermakers men's basketball team represented Purdue University during the 1989–90 college basketball season. Led by head coach Gene Keady, the team finished second in the Big Ten regular season standings. The Boilermakers earned the #2 seed in the Midwest Region of the NCAA tournament, but were upset in the second round by Texas, finishing the season with a 22–8 record (13–5 Big Ten).

== Roster ==
1989–90 Purdue Boilermakers men's basketball team
Players
Coaches

Pos.	#	Name	Height	Weight	Year	Hometown
G	10	Woody Austin	6 ft 2 in (1.88 m)	—	So	Richmond, Indiana
G	12	Matt Painter	6 ft 6 in (1.98 m)	—	Fr	Ft. Wayne, Indiana
F	15	Ryan Berning	6 ft 9 in (2.06 m)	—	Sr	Lafayette, Indiana
G	21	Loren Clyburn	6 ft 5 in (1.96 m)	—	So
G	22	Dave Barrett	6 ft 0 in (1.83 m)	—	Jr	Lafayette, Indiana
F	23	Chuckie White	6 ft 7 in (2.01 m)	—	Jr	Monrovia, California
G	25	Tony Jones	6 ft 3 in (1.91 m)	—	Sr	Ft. Wayne, Indiana
G/F	32	Jimmy Oliver	6 ft 5 in (1.96 m)	200 lb (91 kg)	So	Morrilton, Arkansas
C	54	Craig Riley	6 ft 9 in (2.06 m)	—	Fr	Ft. Wayne, Indiana
F/C	55	Steve Scheffler	6 ft 9 in (2.06 m)	250 lb (113 kg)	Sr	Grand Rapids, Michigan
G		Rich Mount	6 ft 4 in (1.93 m)	—	Fr
C		Todd Schoettelkotte	6 ft 9 in (2.06 m)	—	Fr
G		Sherard Clinkscales	6 ft 3 in (1.91 m)	—	Fr	Indianapolis, Indiana

Head coach

- Gene Keady (Kansas State)

Assistant coach(es)

- Bruce Weber (Milwaukee)
- Tom Reiter (Wisconsin)
- Steve Lavin

Legend

- (C) Team captain
- (S) Suspended
- (I) Ineligible
- (W) Walk-on
- Injured
- Current redshirt

== Schedule and results ==
Date time, TV	Rank^{#}	Opponent^{#}	Result	Record	Site city, state
Regular Season
Nov 24, 1989*		Ball State	W 57–43	1–0	Mackey Arena; West Lafayette, Indiana
Nov 30, 1989*		at Utah	W 65–63	2–0	Jon M. Huntsman Center; Salt Lake City, Utah
Dec 2, 1989*		at Long Beach State	L 69–70	2–1	Gold Mine; Long Beach, California
Dec 7, 1989*		at Illinois State	W 83–69	3–1	Redbird Arena; Normal, Illinois
Dec 9, 1989*		Saint Louis	W 61–54	4–1	Mackey Arena; West Lafayette, Indiana
Dec 18, 1989*		at Wichita State	W 62–54	5–1	Levitt Arena; Wichita, Kansas
Dec 20, 1989*		California	W 60–55	6–1	Mackey Arena; West Lafayette, Indiana
Dec 28, 1989*		vs. Wake Forest	W 66–52	7–1	McKale Center; Tucson, Arizona
Dec 29, 1989*		at No. 21 Arizona	L 66–85	7–2	McKale Center; Tucson, Arizona
Jan 3, 1990*		Eastern Illinois	W 82–55	8–2	Mackey Arena; West Lafayette, Indiana
Jan 6, 1990		Northwestern	W 93–77	9–2 (1–0)	Mackey Arena; West Lafayette, Indiana
Jan 11, 1990		No. 16 Minnesota	W 86–78	10–2 (2–0)	Mackey Arena; West Lafayette, Indiana
Jan 13, 1990		at No. 13 Indiana	W 81–79 ^{OT}	11–2 (3–0)	Assembly Hall; Bloomington, Indiana
Jan 17, 1990	No. 24	at Wisconsin	W 56–54	12–2 (4–0)	Wisconsin Field House; Madison, Wisconsin
Jan 20, 1990	No. 24	No. 7 Illinois	W 81–68	13–2 (5–0)	Mackey Arena; West Lafayette, Indiana
Jan 25, 1990	No. 13	at Ohio State	W 78–66	14–2 (6–0)	St. John Arena; Columbus, Ohio
Jan 27, 1990	No. 13	Iowa	W 80–59	15–2 (7–0)	Mackey Arena; West Lafayette, Indiana
Jan 31, 1990	No. 8	at No. 4 Michigan	W 91–73	16–2 (8–0)	Crisler Arena; Ann Arbor, Michigan
Feb 3, 1990	No. 8	Michigan State	L 53–64	16–3 (8–1)	Mackey Arena; West Lafayette, Indiana
Feb 5, 1990	No. 8	at Northwestern	W 67–60	17–3 (9–1)	Welsh-Ryan Arena; Evanston, Illinois
Feb 11, 1990	No. 10	at No. 17 Minnesota	L 72–73	17–4 (9–2)	Williams Arena; Minneapolis, Minnesota
Feb 17, 1990	No. 12	Wisconsin	W 62–55	18–4 (10–2)	Mackey Arena; West Lafayette, Indiana
Feb 19, 1990*	No. 12	Indiana	W 72–49	19–4 (11–2)	Mackey Arena; West Lafayette, Indiana
Feb 21, 1990; 7:00 p.m.	No. 9	at No. 19 Illinois	L 78–90	19–5 (11–3)	Assembly Hall (16,218); Champaign, Illinois
Feb 24, 1990	No. 9	Ohio State	W 75–70	20–5 (12–3)	Mackey Arena; West Lafayette, Indiana
Mar 1, 1990	No. 9	at Iowa	L 63–64	20–6 (12–4)	Carver-Hawkeye Arena; Iowa City, Iowa
Mar 4, 1990	No. 9	No. 8 Michigan	W 79–77	21–6 (13–4)	Mackey Arena; West Lafayette, Indiana
Mar 11, 1990	No. 10	at No. 7 Michigan State	L 70–72	21–7 (13–5)	Breslin Student Events Center; East Lansing, Michigan
NCAA Tournament
Mar 16, 1990*	(2 MW) No. 10	vs. (15 MW) Northeast Louisiana; First Round	W 75–63	22–7	RCA Dome; Indianapolis, Indiana
Mar 18, 1990*	(2 MW) No. 10	vs. (10 MW) Texas; Second Round	L 72–73	22–8	RCA Dome; Indianapolis, Indiana
*Non-conference game. ^{#}Rankings from AP Poll. (#) Tournament seedings in parentheses. MW=Midwest.

== Awards and honors ==
- Steve Scheffler – Big Ten Player of the Year
- Gene Keady – Big Ten Coach of the Year

== Team players drafted into the NBA ==
Round	Pick	Player	NBA club
2	39	Steve Scheffler	Charlotte Hornets
