= 1989–90 Iowa Hawkeyes men's basketball team =

American college basketball season

1989–90 Iowa Hawkeyes men's basketball
- Conference: Big Ten Conference
- Record: 12–16 (4–14 Big Ten)
- Head coach: Tom Davis (4th season)
- Assistant coaches: Bruce Pearl; Gary Close; Rudy Washington
- MVP: Les Jepsen
- Home arena: Carver-Hawkeye Arena (Capacity: 15,500)

1989–90 Big Ten Conference men's basketball standings
	Conf.				Overall
Team	W		L	PCT	W		L	PCT
No. 3 Michigan State	15	–	3	.833	28	–	6	.824
No. 10 Purdue	13	–	5	.722	22	–	8	.733
No. 13 Michigan	12	–	6	.667	23	–	8	.742
No. 18 Illinois	11	–	7	.611	21	–	8	.724
No. 20 Minnesota	11	–	7	.611	23	–	9	.719
Ohio State	10	–	8	.556	17	–	13	.567
Indiana	8	–	10	.444	18	–	11	.621
Wisconsin	4	–	14	.222	14	–	17	.452
Iowa	4	–	14	.222	12	–	16	.429
Northwestern	2	–	16	.111	9	–	19	.321
Rankings from AP Poll

The 1989–90 Iowa Hawkeyes men's basketball team represented the University of Iowa as members of the Big Ten Conference. The team was led by fourth-year head coach Tom Davis and played their home games at Carver-Hawkeye Arena. They finished the season 12–16 overall and 4–14 in Big Ten play.

== Roster ==
1989–90 Iowa Hawkeyes men's basketball team
Players
Coaches

Pos.	#	Name	Height	Weight	Year	Hometown
G	4	Brian Garner	6 ft 0 in (1.83 m)	—	So	Milwaukee, Wisconsin
G	11	Troy Skinner	5 ft 11 in (1.8 m)	—	So	Palmer, Iowa
G	13	Mark Wetzel	6 ft 5 in (1.96 m)	—	So	Portland, Oregon
G/F	15	Rodell Davis	6 ft 3 in (1.91 m)	—	So	Chicago, Illinois
G/F	24	James Moses	6 ft 4 in (1.93 m)	—	So	Carson, California
G	32	Ray Thompson	6 ft 5 in (1.96 m)	—	So	Summit, Illinois
F	34	Wade Lookingbill	6 ft 6 in (1.98 m)	—	So	Fort Dodge, Iowa
G/F	44	Matt Scott	6 ft 6 in (1.98 m)	—	Sr	Des Moines, Iowa
F	50	Matt Bullard	6 ft 10 in (2.08 m)	—	Sr	Des Moines, Iowa
C	51	Les Jepsen	7 ft 0 in (2.13 m)	—	Sr	Bowbells, North Dakota
F/C	55	Acie Earl	6 ft 10 in (2.08 m)	225 lb (102 kg)	Fr	Moline, Illinois

Head coach

- Tom Davis (UW–Platteville)

Assistant coach(es)

- Bruce Pearl (Boston College)
- Gary Close (Arizona State)
- Rudy Washington (Redlands)

Legend

- (C) Team captain
- (S) Suspended
- (I) Ineligible
- (W) Walk-on
- Injured
- Current redshirt

== Schedule and results ==
Date time, TV	Rank^{#}	Opponent^{#}	Result	Record	Site city, state
Non-conference regular season
Nov 24, 1989*		Texas Southern	W 80–64	1–0	Carver-Hawkeye Arena; Iowa City, Iowa
11/28/1989*		Drake; Iowa Big Four	W 68–54	2–0	Carver-Hawkeye Arena; Iowa City, IA
Dec 1, 1989*		Ohio	W 75–49	3–0	Carver-Hawkeye Arena; Iowa City, Iowa
Dec 2, 1989*		UC Santa Barbara	W 85–79	4–0	Carver-Hawkeye Arena; Iowa City, Iowa
12/7/1989*		Iowa State; Rivalry	W 89–87	5–0	Hilton Coliseum; Ames, IA
12/9/1989*		No. 17 North Carolina	W 87–74	6–0	Carver-Hawkeye Arena (15,500); Iowa City, IA
12/18/1989*	No. 21	Drexel	W 59–50	7–0	Carver-Hawkeye Arena; Iowa City, IA
12/23/1989*	No. 16	at No. 13 UNLV	L 80–97	7–1	Thomas & Mack Center; Las Vegas, NV
Dec 30, 1989*		Monmouth	W 55–46	8–1	Carver-Hawkeye Arena; Iowa City, Iowa
Jan 3, 1990*	No. 20	at Northern Iowa; Iowa Big Four	L 74–77	8–2	UNI-Dome (22,797); Cedar Falls, Iowa
Big Ten Regular Season
Jan 6, 1990		Ohio State	L 73–79	8–3 (0–1)	Carver-Hawkeye Arena; Iowa City, Iowa
Jan 11, 1990		at Wisconsin	L 69–73	8–4 (0–2)	Wisconsin Field House; Madison, Wisconsin
Jan 13, 1990		at Michigan State	L 80–87	8–5 (0–3)	Breslin Student Events Center; East Lansing, Michigan
Jan 18, 1990		No. 14 Indiana	L 79–83	8–6 (0–4)	Carver-Hawkeye Arena; Iowa City, Iowa
Jan 20, 1990		No. 6 Michigan	W 78–76 ^{OT}	9–6 (1–4)	Carver-Hawkeye Arena; Iowa City, IA
Jan 25, 1990		at No. 21 Minnesota	L 72–84	9–7 (1–5)	Williams Arena; Minneapolis, Minnesota
Jan 27, 1990		at No. 13 Purdue	L 59–80	9–8 (1–6)	Mackey Arena; West Lafayette, Indiana
Jan 29, 1990		No. 10 Illinois	W 69–67	10–8 (2–6)	Carver-Hawkeye Arena (15,500); Iowa City, IA
Feb 3, 1990		Northwestern	W 98–80	11–8 (3–6)	Carver-Hawkeye Arena; Iowa City, Iowa
Feb 8, 1990		at Ohio State	L 80–98	11–9 (3–7)	St. John Arena; Columbus, Ohio
Feb 10, 1990		Wisconsin	L 71–80	11–10 (3–8)	Carver-Hawkeye Arena; Iowa City, Iowa
Feb 12, 1990		No. 23 Michigan State	L 70–80	11–11 (3–9)	Carver-Hawkeye Arena; Iowa City, Iowa
Feb 17, 1990		at Indiana	L 71–118	11–12 (3–10)	Assembly Hall; Bloomington, Indiana
Feb 22, 1990		at Northwestern	L 66–72	11–13 (3–11)	Welsh-Ryan Arena; Evanston, Illinois
Feb 24, 1990		No. 18 Minnesota	L 80–102	11–14 (3–12)	Carver-Hawkeye Arena; Iowa City, Iowa
Mar 1, 1990		No. 9 Purdue	W 64–63	12–14 (4–12)	Carver-Hawkeye Arena (15,500); Iowa City, IA
Mar 4, 1990		at No. 18 Illinois	L 85–118	12–15 (4–13)	Assembly Hall; Champaign, Illinois
Mar 11, 1990		at No. 13 Michigan	L 96–127	12–16 (4–14)	Crisler Arena; Ann Arbor, Michigan
*Non-conference game. ^{#}Rankings from AP Poll. (#) Tournament seedings in parentheses.

== Team players in the 1990 NBA draft ==
Round	Pick	Player	NBA club
2	28	Les Jepsen	Golden State Warriors
