= 1989–90 Michigan State Spartans men's basketball team =

American college basketball season

1989–90 Michigan State Spartans men's basketball

Big Ten champions Great Alaska Shootout champions Oldsmobile Spartan Classic champions

NCAA tournament, Sweet Sixteen
- Conference: Big Ten Conference

Ranking
- Coaches: No. 4
- AP: No. 3
- Record: 28–6 (15–3 Big Ten)
- Head coach: Jud Heathcote (14th season)
- Assistant coaches: Tom Izzo; Herb Williams; Jim Boylen
- Captains: Steve Smith; Ken Redfield
- Home arena: Breslin Center

1989–90 Big Ten Conference men's basketball standings
	Conf.				Overall
Team	W		L	PCT	W		L	PCT
No. 3 Michigan State	15	–	3	.833	28	–	6	.824
No. 10 Purdue	13	–	5	.722	22	–	8	.733
No. 13 Michigan	12	–	6	.667	23	–	8	.742
No. 18 Illinois	11	–	7	.611	21	–	8	.724
No. 20 Minnesota	11	–	7	.611	23	–	9	.719
Ohio State	10	–	8	.556	17	–	13	.567
Indiana	8	–	10	.444	18	–	11	.621
Wisconsin	4	–	14	.222	14	–	17	.452
Iowa	4	–	14	.222	12	–	16	.429
Northwestern	2	–	16	.111	9	–	19	.321
Rankings from AP Poll

The 1989–90 Michigan State Spartans men's basketball team represented Michigan State University in the 1989–90 NCAA Division I men's basketball season. The team played their home games at newly-opened Breslin Center in East Lansing, Michigan and were members of the Big Ten Conference. They were coached by Jud Heathcote in his 14th year at Michigan State. The Spartans finished the season with a record of 28–6, 15–3 to win the Big Ten championship by two games. As the No. 3-ranked team in the country, they received the conference's automatic bid to the NCAA tournament as the No. 1 seed in the Southeast region. In the first round, they narrowly avoided becoming the first No. 1 seed to lose a No. 16 seed, beating Murray State in overtime. They then defeated UC Santa Barbara in the second round to earn a trip to the Sweet Sixteen, their first trip since 1986. There they lost in overtime to Georgia Tech.

Ken Redfield was named the Big Ten Defensive Player of the Year.

== Previous season ==
The Spartans finished the 1988–89 season 18–15, 6–12 to finish in eighth place in Big Ten play. Michigan State received a bid to the National Invitation Tournament. There the Spartans beat Kent State, Wichita State, and Villanova to reach the final four at Madison Square Garden. In the semifinals, they lost to Saint Louis before losing to UAB in the third-place game.

== Season summary ==
The Spartans were led by junior Steve Smith (20.2 points and 7.0 rebounds, and 4.8 assists per game), senior Kirk Manns (15.5 points per game), and Ken Redfield (11.6 points per game). The team also featured sophomore Mark Montgomery and freshman Dwayne Stephens who would both later become assistant coaches at Michigan State under Tom Izzo.

MSU began their season by traveling to Alaska to participate in the Great Alaska Shootout. There, they defeated Auburn, Texas A&M, and Kansas State to capture the Shootout championship. They suffered their first loss of the season at UIC after being ranked for the first time that season. Two games later, the Spartans lost at Breslin Center to Bowling Green. They finished their non-conference schedule with an 11–2 record.

Michigan State started the Big Ten season 3–0 before losing to No. 7 Illinois on the road. In a four-game stretch against ranked teams, the Spartans defeated No. 12 Indiana in Bloomington, but lost to rival No. 7 Michigan at home. A loss to No. 19 Minnesota preceded a win over No. 8 Purdue and left the Spartans at 6–3 in the Big Ten. Following the victory over Purdue, MSU entered the AP rankings at No. 23. The Spartans won their remaining nine games to finish the season on a 10-game winning streak. The streak included wins over No. 15 Illinois, No. 25 Indiana, No. 8 Michigan, No. 17 Minnesota, and No. 10 Purdue in a six-game stretch. The finish gave the Spartans the Big Ten championship by two games over Purdue with a 15–3 record, and they finished the season ranked No. 3 in the country.

The Spartans received the Big Ten's automatic bid to the NCAA Tournament as a No. 1 seed. In the Tournament, the Spartans narrowly defeated 16th-seeded Murray State, led by Popeye Jones, in overtime to avoid becoming the only No. 1 seed to lose to a 16 seed. They again narrowly defeated ninth-seeded UC Santa Barbara in the second round by four points to advance to the Sweet Sixteen for the first time since 1986. In the Sweet Sixteen, the Spartans 12-game winning streak came to end as they lost to fourth-seeded Georgia Tech. The game featured a controversial last second basket by Tech's Kenny Anderson to force overtime where the Spartans fell 81–80.

== Roster and statistics ==
1989–90 Michigan State Spartans men's basketball team
No	Name	Pos	Year	Height	Pts	Reb	Ast
22	Jeff Casler	G	JR	6–0	0.8	0.4	0.5
23	Jesse Hall	G	JR	6–3	1.0	1.1	0.4
10	Kirk Manns	G	SR	6–1	15.3	1.8	1.8
11	Mark Montgomery	G	SO	6–2	3.6	2.0	2.9
34	Dave Mueller	C	SR	6–9	0.3	0.5	0.0
54	Mike Peplowski	C	FR	6–10	5.3	5.8	0.7
20	Ken Redfield	F	SR	6–7	11.6	6.8	3.1
21	Steve Smith	G	JR	6–6	20.2	7.0	4.8
35	Matt Steigenga	F	SO	6–7	10.4	3.5	1.9
31	Dwayne Stephens	F	FR	6–7	4.3	3.0	0.8
24	Todd Wolfe	G	SR	6–5	2.1	1.2	0.4
25	Jon Zulauf	F	FR	6–6	0.7	1.0	0.2

== Schedule and results ==
Date time, TV	Rank^{#}	Opponent^{#}	Result	Record	Site city, state
Non-conference regular season
Nov 24, 1989*		vs. Auburn; Great Alaska Shootout	W 92–79	1–0	Sullivan Arena; Anchorage, AK
Nov 25, 1989*		vs. Texas A&M; Great Alaska Shootout semifinals	W 87–75	2–0	Sullivan Arena; Anchorage, AK
Nov 27, 1989*		vs. Kansas State; Great Alaska Shootout championship	W 73–68	3–0	Sullivan Arena; Anchorage, AK
Nov 29, 1989*		Nebraska	W 80–69	4–0	Breslin Center; East Lansing, MI
Dec 2, 1989*		at Furman	W 84–63	5–0	Memorial Auditorium; Greenville, SC
Dec 9, 1989*		Austin Peay	W 88–76	6–0	Breslin Center; East Lansing, MI
Dec 12, 1989*	No. 25	at UIC	L 57–65	6–1	UIC Pavilion; Chicago, IL
Dec 16, 1989*	No. 25	Detroit Mercy	W 94–65	7–1	Breslin Center; East Lansing, MI
Dec 18, 1989*	No. 25	Bowling Green State	L 79–81	7–2	Breslin Center; East Lansing, MI
Dec 20, 1989*	No. 25	at Evansville	W 80–66	8–2	Roberts Stadium; Evansville, IN
Dec 23, 1989*	No. 25	Eastern Michigan	W 87–73	9–2	Breslin Center; East Lansing, MI
Dec 29, 1989*		San Jose State; Oldsmobile Spartan Classic semifinals	W 88–61	10–2	Breslin Center; East Lansing, MI
Dec 30, 1989*		Princeton; Oldsmobile Spartan Classic championship	W 51–49	11–2	Breslin Center; East Lansing, MI
Big Ten regular season
Jan 6, 1990		at Wisconsin	W 64–61	12–2 (1–0)	Wisconsin Field House; Madison, WI
Jan 11, 1990		Ohio State	W 78–68	13–2 (2–0)	Breslin Center; East Lansing, MI
Jan 13, 1990		Iowa	W 87–80	14–2 (3–0)	Breslin Center; East Lansing, MI
Jan 18, 1990		at No. 7 Illinois	L 64–73	14–3 (3–1)	Assembly Hall (Illinois); Champaign, IL
Jan 20, 1990		Northwestern	W 91–80	15–3 (4–1)	Breslin Center; East Lansing, MI
Jan 24, 1990		at No. 12 Indiana	W 75–57	16–3 (5–1)	Assembly Hall; Bloomington, IN
Jan 27, 1990		at No. 7 Michigan; Rivalry	L 63–65	16–4 (5–2)	Crisler Arena; Ann Arbor, MI
Feb 1, 1990		No. 19 Minnesota	L 74–79	16–5 (5–3)	Breslin Center; East Lansing, MI
Feb 3, 1990		at No. 8 Purdue	W 64–53	17–5 (6–3)	Mackey Arena; West Lafayette, IN
Feb 8, 1990	No. 23	Wisconsin	W 60–57	18–5 (7–3)	Breslin Center; East Lansing, MI
Feb 10, 1990	No. 25	at Ohio State	W 84–75	19–5 (8–3)	St. John Arena; Columbus, OH
Feb 12, 1990	No. 23	at Iowa	W 80–70	20–5 (9–3)	Carver-Hawkeye Arena; Iowa City, IA
Feb 17, 1990	No. 21	No. 15 Illinois	W 70–63	21–6 (10–3)	Breslin Center; East Lansing, MI
Feb 25, 1990	No. 15	No. 25 Indiana	W 72–66	22–6 (11–3)	Breslin Center; East Lansing, MI
Mar 1, 1990	No. 14	No. 8 Michigan; Rivalry	W 78–70	23–5 (12–3)	Breslin Center; East Lansing, MI
Mar 3, 1990	No. 14	at No. 17 Minnesota	W 75–73	24–5 (13–3)	Williams Arena; Minneapolis, MN
Mar 8, 1990	No. 7	at Northwestern	W 84–68	25–5 (14–3)	Welsh-Ryan Arena; Evanston, IL
Mar 11, 1990	No. 7	No. 10 Purdue	W 72–70	26–5 (15–3)	Breslin Center; East Lansing, MI
NCAA tournament
Mar 15, 1990*	(1 SE) No. 3	vs. (16 SE) Murray State; First Round	W 75–71 ^{OT}	27–5	Thompson-Boling Arena; Knoxville, TN
Mar 17, 1990*	(1 SE) No. 3	vs. (9 SE) UC-Santa Barbara; Second Round	W 62–58	28–5	Thompson-Boling Arena; Knoxville, TN
Mar 23, 1990*	(1 SE) No. 3	vs. (4 SE) No. 9 Georgia Tech; Sweet Sixteen	L 80–81 ^{OT}	28–6	Louisiana Superdome; New Orleans, LA
*Non-conference game. ^{#}Rankings from AP Poll,. (#) Tournament seedings in parentheses. All times are in Central Time; Source.

== Rankings ==
Ranking movement Legend: ██ Increase in ranking. ██ Decrease in ranking. (RV) Received votes but unranked. (NR) Not ranked.
Poll	Pre	Wk 2	Wk 3	Wk 4	Wk 5	Wk 6	Wk 7	Wk 8	Wk 9	Wk 10	Wk 11	Wk 12	Wk 13	Wk 14	Wk 15	Wk 16	Wk 17
AP	NR	NR	NR	25	25	NR	NR	NR	NR	NR	NR	23	21	15	14	7	3

Source.

== Awards and honors ==
- Steve Smith – All-Big Ten First Team
