= Kendall Gill =

American basketball player (born 1968)

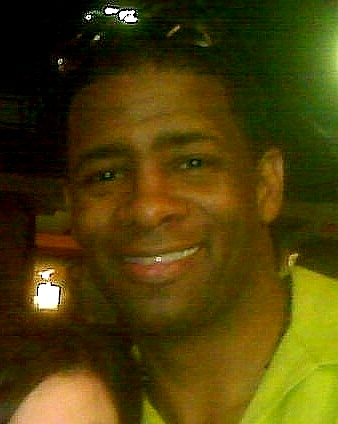
- Gill in 2010

Personal information
- Born: May 25, 1968 (age 58) Chicago, Illinois, U.S.
- Listed height: 6 ft 5 in (1.96 m)
- Listed weight: 216 lb (98 kg)

Career information
- High school: Rich Central (Olympia Fields, Illinois)
- College: Illinois (1986–1990)
- NBA draft: 1990: 1st round, 5th overall pick
- Drafted by: Charlotte Hornets
- Playing career: 1990–2005
- Position: Shooting guard / small forward
- Number: 13, 9, 12

Career history
- 1990–1993: Charlotte Hornets
- 1993–1995: Seattle SuperSonics
- 1995–1996: Charlotte Hornets
- 1996–2001: New Jersey Nets
- 2001–2002: Miami Heat
- 2002–2003: Minnesota Timberwolves
- 2003–2004: Chicago Bulls
- 2004–2005: Milwaukee Bucks

Career highlights
- NBA All-Rookie First Team (1991); NBA steals leader (1999); Consensus second-team All-American (1990); First-team All-Big Ten (1990)

Career NBA statistics
- Points: 12,914 (13.4 ppg)
- Rebounds: 4,002 (4.1 rpg)
- Steals: 1,519 (1.6 spg)
- Stats at NBA.com
- Stats at Basketball Reference

Kendall Cedric Gill (born May 25, 1968) is an American former professional basketball player who now works as a television basketball analyst.

== Early life ==
Gill was born in Chicago and attended Rich Central High School in Olympia Fields, Illinois. Graduating in 1986 as a senior, he led Rich Central to a second-place finish in the IHSA class AA state boys basketball tournament. Gill led his team in scoring with 54 points in the four games of the tournament finals, and was named to the six-player All-Tournament team.

After high school, Gill attended the University of Illinois. Playing four years for the Fighting Illini, he was a starter in his last three seasons. As a junior, Gill led the Fighting Illini to the 1989 Final Four before losing to Michigan on a last-second shot. Also among that fabled "Flyin' Illini" squadron were future NBA players Nick Anderson, Marcus Liberty, Kenny Battle and Illini TV/radio broadcaster Stephen Bardo as well as four-year starter Lowell Hamilton. As a senior, Gill led the Big Ten in scoring and was named a first-team All-American (UPI). He left Illinois as the seventh-leading scorer in school history. Gill's Illini earned NCAA bids each year he played. He also won the NCAA Slam Dunk championship in the Final Four his senior season.

Gill was elected to the "Illini Men's Basketball All-Century Team" in 2004.

== NBA career ==
Gill was chosen in the 1990 NBA draft as the fifth overall pick by the Charlotte Hornets, and was named First Team All-Rookie for the 1990–91 season. During this same season, Gill participated in the NBA Slam-Dunk Competition. He had a tough time as a rookie trying to fit into the Hornets rotation, alongside already established back-court teammates Muggsy Bogues and Rex Chapman.

After the 1991 addition of Larry Johnson and departure of Rex Chapman to the Washington Bullets, Gill had a breakthrough year in the 1991–92 season by averaging 20.5 points, 5.1 rebounds and 4.2 assists per game, while shooting 46.7% from the field.

In 1993 the Hornets reached the NBA postseason for the first time in franchise history. Gill was traded to the Seattle SuperSonics during the following off-season, along with the Hornets' 1994 first-round pick, for Eddie Johnson, Dana Barros, and the SuperSonics' 1994 first-round pick. The SuperSonics, who also added Detlef Schrempf that summer, had a team led by Gary Payton and Shawn Kemp. The SuperSonics had two first round eliminations by the Denver Nuggets in 1994 and the Los Angeles Lakers in 1995. Gill returned to Charlotte for the 1995–96 season after being traded there for Hersey Hawkins and David Wingate and in January 1996 the Hornets traded Gill and Khalid Reeves to the New Jersey Nets for Kenny Anderson, who became the team's starting point guard while Bogues sat out with a knee injury that limited him to just six games for the entire season. Gill's injury limited him to 11 games in the rest of the season.

From 1996 to 2001, Gill played for the Nets, scoring a career-high 41 points on January 14, 1997, helping the team reach the 1998 playoffs, and leading the league in steals in 1998–99. On April 3, 1999, Gill recorded 11 steals in a game against the Miami Heat, tying a single-game record set by Larry Kenon during the 1976–77 season. In this game, he also recorded 15 points and 10 rebounds for a rare points-rebounds-steals triple-double; he is the last player to record a triple-double with points-rebounds-steals. Gill's final season in New Jersey, the 2000–01 season, was shortened by injury, allowing him to play in only 31 games during the season.

In his final four seasons in the NBA, Gill played the 2001–02 season with the Miami Heat, the 2002–03 season with the Minnesota Timberwolves, and the 2003–04 season with the Chicago Bulls, before completing his career with the Milwaukee Bucks in 2004.

In his 15 seasons in the NBA, Gill played in 966 games for seven teams. He also appeared in 27 playoff games for four teams. He was a member of the NBA All-Rookie Team in 1991 and went on to compile 12,914 points, 2,945 assists, and 4,002 rebounds during his career.

== Personal life ==
Gill was raised in Matteson, Illinois. He is married to Wendy Gill, and has two boys, Phoenix and Kota.

Gill was a professional boxer who had his first bout on June 25, 2005, at the age of 37.

In 1994, Gill made an appearance as himself in a Nickelodeon TV show My Brother and Me. He appeared on the January 23, 2008 edition of Spike TV's Pros vs. Joes.

In 2004 his house was featured on MTV Cribs.

On May 15, 2010, Gill sang a rendition of "Take Me Out to the Ballgame" at Wrigley Field, home of the Chicago Cubs, as they took on the Pittsburgh Pirates.

Gill has provided analysis during pregame and postgame shows on Comcast SportsNet Chicago for Chicago Bulls games. On March 22, 2013, Gill was suspended by Comcast SportsNet for the remainder of the 2012–13 season after a reported physical altercation with analyst Tim Doyle in the Comcast SportsNet newsroom. In September 2013, Gill indicated that he was not returning to the station. However, he was rehired by Comcast SportsNet in late 2015..

With the end of Comcast SportsNet, Gill moved to the newly-launched Chicago Sports Network for pre- and post-game analysis for Chicago Bulls broadcasts. This started with the NBA pre-season in October, 2024.

In 2017, Gill was signed as a free agent in the BIG3 basketball league by Power to take the place of Corey Maggette after he suffered an injury during the season.

== Honors ==
=== High school ===
- 1986 – IHSA State Tournament All-Tournament Team
- 1992 – Inducted into the Illinois Basketball Coaches Association's Hall of Fame as a player

=== College ===
- 1989 – Kenny Battle Leadership Award Recipient
- 1989 – NCAA All-Regional Team
- 1989 – Honorable Mention All-Big Ten
- 1989 – Honorable Mention All American
- 1990 – Playboy Pre-Season All-American
- 1990 – Preseason Wooden Award Nominee
- 1990 – Illini Team Co-Captain
- 1990 – Illini MVP
- 1990 – 1st Team All-Big Ten
- 1990 – Consensus 2nd Team All American
- 1990 – University of Illinois Athlete of the Year
- 2004 – Elected to the "Illini Men's Basketball All-Century Team"
- 2008 – Honored jersey which hangs in the State Farm Center to show regard for being the most decorated basketball players in the University of Illinois' history.
- 2018 – Inducted into the Illinois Athletics Hall of Fame

=== NBA ===
- 1991 – NBA Slam Dunk Contest competitor
- 1991 – NBA All-Rookie First Team
- 1999 – annual steals leader
- 2018 – Charlotte Hornets 30th Anniversary Team

== NBA career statistics ==
Legend
GP	Games played	GS	Games started	MPG	Minutes per game
FG%	Field goal percentage	3P%	3-point field goal percentage	FT%	Free throw percentage
RPG	Rebounds per game	APG	Assists per game	SPG	Steals per game
BPG	Blocks per game	PPG	Points per game	**Bold**	Career high
*	Led the league

=== NBA ===
==== Regular season ====
Year	Team	GP	GS	MPG	FG%	3P%	FT%	RPG	APG	SPG	BPG	PPG
1990–91	Charlotte	**82**	36	23.7	.450	.143	.835	3.2	3.7	1.3	.5	11.0
1991–92	Charlotte	79	79	36.8	.467	.240	.745	5.1	4.2	1.9	.6	20.5
1992–93	Charlotte	69	67	35.2	.449	.274	.772	4.9	3.9	1.4	.5	16.9
1993–94	Seattle	79	77	30.8	.443	.317	.782	3.4	3.5	1.9	.4	14.1
1994–95	Seattle	73	58	29.1	.457	**.368**	.742	4.0	2.6	1.6	.4	13.7
1995–96	Charlotte	36	36	35.1	**.481**	.315	.761	5.3	**6.3**	1.2	.6	12.9
1995–96	New Jersey	11	10	38.0	.441	.360	.831	3.9	3.2	2.0	.2	17.5
1996–97	New Jersey	**82**	**81**	**39.0**	.443	.336	.797	**6.1**	4.0	1.9	.6	**21.8**
1997–98	New Jersey	81	**81**	33.7	.429	.257	.688	4.8	2.5	1.9	**.8**	13.4
1998–99	New Jersey	50*	47	32.1	.398	.118	.683	4.9	2.5	**2.7***	.5	11.8
1999–2000	New Jersey	76	75	31.0	.414	.256	.710	3.7	2.8	1.8	.5	13.1
2000–01	New Jersey	31	26	28.8	.331	.286	.722	4.2	2.8	1.5	.2	9.1
2001–02	Miami	65	49	21.7	.384	.136	.677	2.8	1.5	.7	.1	5.7
2002–03	Minnesota	**82**	34	25.2	.422	.322	.764	3.0	1.9	1.0	.2	8.7
2003–04	Chicago	56	35	25.2	.392	.237	.735	3.4	1.6	1.2	.3	9.6
2004–05	Milwaukee	14	0	20.3	.400	.333	**.900**	2.6	1.9	1.0	.3	6.1
Career		966	791	30.5	.434	.300	.754	4.1	3.0	1.6	.4	13.4

==== Playoffs ====
Year	Team	GP	GS	MPG	FG%	3P%	FT%	RPG	APG	SPG	BPG	PPG
1993	Charlotte	**9**	**9**	**39.2**	.401	.167	.714	**5.1**	**2.9**	**2.3**	**.7**	**17.3**
1994	Seattle	5	5	30.6	.433	.222	.619	4.8	2.0	1.2	.2	13.4
1995	Seattle	4	0	18.0	.360	.250	.625	1.0	2.5	1.0	.3	6.3
1998	New Jersey	3	3	33.3	**.450**	—	**.875**	4.3	1.0	1.3	.3	14.3
2003	Minnesota	6	0	19.7	.370	**.500**	.643	2.2	1.2	.7	.2	5.2
Career		27	17	29.5	.408	.259	.686	3.7	2.1	1.4	.4	11.9

=== College ===
Year	Team	GP	GS	MPG	FG%	3P%	FT%	RPG	APG	SPG	BPG	PPG
1986–87	Illinois	31	0	11.1	.482	.000	.642	1.4	.9	1.3	.3	3.7
1987–88	Illinois	**33**	23	28.7	.471	.304	.753	2.2	**4.2**	2.0	.1	10.4
1988–89	Illinois	24	18	28.4	**.542**	**.458**	**.793**	2.9	3.8	2.1	.3	15.4
1989–90	Illinois	29	**29**	**34.5**	.500	.348	.777	**4.9**	3.3	**2.2**	**.6**	**20.0**
Career		117	70	25.4	.501	.374	.755	2.8	3.0	1.9	.3	12.0

== See also ==
- List of NBA single-game steals leaders
