= 1990 NCAA Men's Basketball All-Americans =

- Awarded for: 1989–90 NCAA Division I men's basketball season

The Consensus 1990 College Basketball All-American team, as determined by aggregating the results of four major All-American teams. To earn "consensus" status, a player must win honors from a majority of the following teams: the Associated Press, the USBWA, The United Press International and the National Association of Basketball Coaches.

== 1990 Consensus All-America team ==
Consensus First Team
Player	Position	Class	Team
Derrick Coleman	F	Senior	Syracuse
Chris Jackson	G	Sophomore	Louisiana State
Larry Johnson	F	Junior	UNLV
Gary Payton	G	Senior	Oregon State
Lionel Simmons	F	Senior	La Salle

Consensus Second Team
Player	Position	Class	Team
Hank Gathers	F/C	Senior	Loyola Marymount
Kendall Gill	G	Senior	Illinois
Bo Kimble	G/F	Senior	Loyola Marymount
Alonzo Mourning	C	Sophomore	Georgetown
Rumeal Robinson	G	Senior	Michigan
Dennis Scott	F	Junior	Georgia Tech
Doug Smith	F	Junior	Missouri

== Individual All-America teams ==
All-America Team
All-America Team	First team		Second team		Third team	
All-America Team	Player	School	Player	School	Player	School
Associated Press	Derrick Coleman	Syracuse	Rumeal Robinson	Michigan	Kendall Gill	Illinois
Associated Press	Chris Jackson	LSU	Doug Smith	Missouri	Hank Gathers	Loyola Marymount
Associated Press	Larry Johnson	UNLV	Dennis Scott	Georgia Tech	Kenny Anderson	Georgia Tech
Associated Press	Gary Payton	Oregon State	Bo Kimble	Loyola Marymount	Steve Scheffler	Purdue
Associated Press	Lionel Simmons	La Salle	Alonzo Mourning	Georgetown	Steve Smith	Michigan State
USBWA	Derrick Coleman	Syracuse	Rumeal Robinson	Michigan	No third team	
USBWA	Chris Jackson	LSU	Doug Smith	Missouri	No third team	
USBWA	Larry Johnson	UNLV	Dennis Scott	Georgia Tech	No third team	
USBWA	Gary Payton	Oregon State	Bo Kimble	Loyola Marymount	No third team	
USBWA	Lionel Simmons	La Salle	Hank Gathers	Loyola Marymount	No third team	
NABC	Derrick Coleman	Syracuse	Rumeal Robinson	Michigan	Kendall Gill	Illinois
NABC	Chris Jackson	LSU	Doug Smith	Missouri	Bo Kimble	Loyola Marymount
NABC	Alonzo Mourning	Georgetown	Kenny Anderson	Georgia Tech	Dennis Scott	Georgia Tech
NABC	Gary Payton	Oregon State	Hank Gathers	Loyola Marymount	Billy Owens	Syracuse
NABC	Lionel Simmons	La Salle	Larry Johnson	UNLV	Mark Randall	Kansas
UPI	Derrick Coleman	Syracuse	Rumeal Robinson	Michigan	Bo Kimble	Loyola Marymount
UPI	Kendall Gill	Illinois	Doug Smith	Missouri	Billy Owens	Syracuse
UPI	Larry Johnson	UNLV	Dennis Scott	Georgia Tech	Anthony Peeler	Missouri
UPI	Gary Payton	Oregon State	Chris Jackson	LSU	Steve Scheffler	Purdue
UPI	Lionel Simmons	La Salle	Alec Kessler	Georgia	Steve Smith	Michigan State

AP Honorable Mention:

- Greg Anthony, UNLV
- Stacey Augmon, UNLV
- Anthony Bonner, Saint Louis
- Jud Buechler, Arizona
- Willie Burton, Minnesota
- David Butler, UNLV
- Elden Campbell, Clemson
- Cedric Ceballos, Cal State Fullerton
- Bimbo Coles, Virginia Tech
- John Crotty, Virginia
- Dale Davis, Clemson
- William Davis, Oklahoma
- Todd Day, Arkansas
- LaPhonso Ellis, Notre Dame
- Keith Gailes, Loyola (IL)
- Chris Gatling, Old Dominion
- Gerald Glass, Ole Miss
- Litterial Green, Georgia
- Boo Harvey, St. John's
- Nadav Henefeld, Connecticut
- Skeeter Henry, Oklahoma
- Carl Herrera, Houston
- Tyrone Hill, Xavier
- Keith Jennings, East Tennessee State
- Alec Kessler, Georgia
- Negele Knight, Dayton
- Christian Laettner, Duke
- Marcus Liberty, Illinois
- Mark Macon, Temple
- Kirk Manns, Michigan State
- Lee Mayberry, Arkansas
- Travis Mays, Texas
- Eric McArthur, UC Santa Barbara
- Terry Mills, Michigan
- Mike Mitchell, Colorado State
- Rodney Monroe, NC State
- Dikembe Mutombo, Georgetown
- Brian Oliver, Georgia Tech
- Shaquille O'Neal, LSU
- Billy Owens, Syracuse
- Anthony Peeler, Missouri
- Kevin Pritchard, Kansas
- Chris Smith, Connecticut
- LaBradford Smith, Louisville
- Tony Smith, Marquette
- Bryant Stith, Virginia
- Felton Spencer, Louisville
- Ed Stokes, Arizona
- Mark Tillmon, Georgetown
- Stephen Thompson, Syracuse
- Clarence Weatherspoon, Southern Miss
