= Rumeal Robinson =

American basketball player (born 1966)

Personal information
- Born: November 13, 1966 (age 60) Mandeville, Jamaica
- Listed height: 6 ft 2 in (1.88 m)
- Listed weight: 195 lb (88 kg)

Career information
- High school: Cambridge Rindge and Latin (Cambridge, Massachusetts)
- College: Michigan (1987–1990)
- NBA draft: 1990: 1st round, 10th overall pick
- Drafted by: Atlanta Hawks
- Playing career: 1990–2002
- Position: Point guard
- Number: 22, 24, 20, 21

Career history
- 1990–1992: Atlanta Hawks
- 1992–1993: New Jersey Nets
- 1993–1994: Charlotte Hornets
- 1994–1995: Rapid City Thrillers
- 1995: Shreveport Crawdads
- 1995: Shreveport Storm
- 1995–1996: Connecticut Pride
- 1996: Portland Trail Blazers
- 1996–1997: Los Angeles Lakers
- 1997: Phoenix Suns
- 1997: Portland Trail Blazers
- 1997–1998: Grand Rapids Hoops
- 1998: La Crosse Bobcats
- 2001–2002: KK Zadar
- 2002: Skipper Bologna
- 2002: Marinos de Oriente

Career highlights
- NCAA champion (1989); Consensus second-team All-American (1990); First-team Parade All-American (1986); McDonald's All-American (1986)

Career NBA statistics
- Points: 2,546 (7.6 ppg)
- Rebounds: 606 (1.8 rpg)
- Assists: 1,179 (3.5 apg)
- Stats at NBA.com
- Stats at Basketball Reference
Medals
Men's basketball
Representing United States
Pan American Games
Silver medal – second place	1995 Mar del Plata	National team

Rumeal James Robinson (born November 13, 1966) is a Jamaican-American former professional basketball player.

Growing up in Cambridge, Massachusetts, Robinson graduated from Cambridge Rindge and Latin School and went on to play point guard for the University of Michigan. After a strong showing in Michigan's 1989 NCAA championship, Robinson was drafted #10 in the first round of the 1990 NBA draft. He played professionally until 2002, then started a criminal career that ended with him being sentenced to prison in 2011 on multiple convictions for bank bribery and wire fraud.

== Early life ==
Robinson was born in Mandeville, Jamaica, in the west-central portion of the island. His mother moved to the Boston area while he was a toddler, leaving him in his grandparents' care. Shortly after he turned 10 years old, his grandparents sent him to the United States in hopes of reuniting him with his mother. However, his mother made it clear that she didn't want him, and he was reduced to sleeping in apartment halls and Harvard College dorm stairways.

Early in the 1977–78 school year, he was taken in by Helen and Lou Ford, a respected local couple. They adopted him in 1978. He blossomed into a star guard at Cambridge Rindge and Latin School, leading them to a state championship in 1986.

== College ==
Robinson averaged 14.3 points and 5.7 assists during his collegiate career at the University of Michigan. He achieved fame during his junior year for sinking two crucial free throws with 3 seconds left in the 1989 NCAA Men's Division I Basketball Championship to win the game for the Wolverines over Seton Hall University. His mother persuaded the city of Cambridge to name her street "Rumeal Robinson Way" in his honor.

== NBA career ==
Robinson was drafted in 1990 by the Atlanta Hawks with the 10th pick. He was signed to a four-year deal with the Hawks. He also played for the New Jersey Nets, Charlotte Hornets, Portland Trail Blazers, Phoenix Suns and Los Angeles Lakers. Robinson also spent time in the Continental Basketball Association. He played in the Euroleague during the 2001–02 season for KK Zadar.

In the NBA, Robinson's play was very inconsistent. His last season as a regular player was 1992–93, his first year in New Jersey; after that year, he never played in more than 54 games a season.

He was one of three Robinsons that the Portland Trail Blazers had in their line-up for the 1995–96 NBA season. The others were Clifford Robinson and James Robinson (both no relation).

Robinson made some $5 million in the NBA, but spent it on a lavish lifestyle. He went through money so irresponsibly, he neglected to pay his bills. He was forced into bankruptcy in 1998.

== Post-playing career, criminal activity and conviction ==
Rumeal James Robinson
- Born: November 13, 1966 (age 60); Mandeville, Jamaica
- Occupations: Basketball player (retired), property developer
- Status: Released September 19, 2016
- Conviction: September 8, 2010
- Criminal charges: Bank fraud, bank bribery, wire fraud, conspiracy to commit bank fraud, making false statements to a financial institution
- Penalty: 6 1/2 years in federal prison, $1.2 million in restitution, five years' supervised release

After his playing career was over, Robinson moved to Miami and attempted to become a property developer in his native Jamaica. He planned to build a 25,000 acre resort in his hometown called Harmony Cove. As part of his bid to attract investors, he persuaded his adoptive mother to take out a second mortgage on her house and lend it to Robinson as seed money. He promised to cover all the payments, and promised to give her $500,000 once the project was finished.

However, his high living in the 1990s had all but destroyed his credit, and he was unable to find a bank willing to lend him any money. Through a friend, he was referred to Community State Bank in Ankeny, Iowa. The bank's senior loan officer, Brian Williams, approved a $377,000 bridge loan to Robinson's company, Megaladon Development—ostensibly to help with advertising and business plans. Robinson paid $100,000 of the loan back to Williams as a bribe to move the approval process forward.

Over the next year and a half, Robinson received $1.2 million in loans from Community State Bank, all approved by Williams. However, he never paid the bank back a single penny, and barely five percent of the money went toward developing Harmony Cove. The rest of it was used to buy expensive clothes, meals, motorcycles, jewelry, and other accoutrements of the high life.

The fraud was uncovered when Williams tried to hide the bad loans by rolling the interest and penalties into the principal for a new loan. One of Williams' subordinates was alarmed enough to alert bank officials. Community State Bank fired Williams and sued Megaladon for nonpayment. In August 2006, Community State Bank won $535,000 in damages. During the proceedings, it emerged that Robinson hadn't paid taxes since his playing days. During depositions to ascertain his net worth, Robinson admitted he owned nothing of value, and lived on roughly $20 at a time. His only possession was a second pair of pants.

On August 24, 2009, a federal grand jury in Des Moines indicted Robinson, his girlfriend Stephanie Hodge, and Williams for bank fraud, conspiracy to commit bank fraud, bank bribery, wire fraud and making false statements to a financial institution. Robinson surrendered to authorities on September 4.

Soon after the arrest, his adoptive mother Helen Ford came forward and accused Robinson of swindling her out of her home. Unbeknownst to Ford, Robinson had arranged to sell Ford's house to one of his business partners, Miami foreclosure specialist Rick Preston, for $250,000. Preston later sold the house to another business partner, Jorge Rodriguez, for $600,000. In turn, Rodriguez sold it to Stephen Hodge, the brother of Robinson's girlfriend at the time, for $1 million. The money was supposedly intended to help build Harmony Cove, but was wasted on lavish spending and paying down debts. While Robinson initially tried to stay current on the mortgage payment, it went unserviced for so long that a bank foreclosed on her house in 2007. In 2009, Ford was forced to move out of her home. By this time, Robinson had lost possession of his expensive condo in Aventura, and was living in a squalid, budget motel in North Miami Beach. Ford eventually got her home back in 2013.

On September 8, 2010, Robinson was convicted of 11 counts of bank bribery, wire fraud, conspiracy to commit bank fraud and making false statements to a financial institution. On January 7, 2011, federal judge Ronald E. Longstaff sentenced Robinson to 6 1/2 years (78 months) in prison. He was also ordered to pay $1,184,615 in restitution to Community State Bank and St. Paul Mercury Insurance. Robinson appealed his sentence in September 2011, claiming judge Longstaff had denied him a chance to change lawyers and had improperly taken his allocution statement into account at sentencing. A panel of the Eighth Circuit Court of Appeals rejected the arguments and upheld the sentence in December.

In March, 2012, a federal judge ruled that US$369,000 of Robinson's pension fund could be seized to help cover restitution owed to cover his fraudulent business deals.

Robinson served his sentence at federal prisons in South Carolina, Louisiana and Florida. He was released on September 19, 2016, on five years' supervised release.

== See also ==
- Michigan Wolverines men's basketball statistical leaders
