= 1989–90 NCAA Division I men's basketball rankings =

- Season: 1989–90
- NCAA Tournament: 1990
- Preseason No. 1: UNLV
- NCAA Tournament Champions: UNLV
NCAA Division I men's basketball rankings


The 1989–90 NCAA Division I men's basketball rankings were made up of two human polls, the AP Poll and the Coaches Poll, in addition to various other preseason polls.

== Legend ==
	Increase in ranking
	Decrease in ranking
	New to rankings from previous week
Italics	Number of first place votes
(#–#)	Win–loss record
т	Tied with team above or below also with this symbol

== AP Poll ==
The AP poll expanded to 25 teams beginning with the 1989–90 season.

	Preseason Pre	Week 2 Nov. 27	Week 3 Dec. 5	Week 4 Dec. 12	Week 5 Dec. 19	Week 6 Dec. 26	Week 7 Jan. 2	Week 8 Jan. 9	Week 9 Jan. 16	Week 10 Jan. 23	Week 11 Jan. 30	Week 12 Feb. 6	Week 13 Feb. 13	Week 14 Feb. 20	Week 15 Feb. 27	Week 16 Mar. 6	Final Mar. 13	
1.	UNLV	Syracuse (0–0)	Syracuse (4–0)	Syracuse (6–0)	Syracuse (7–0)	Syracuse (8–0)	Syracuse (9–0)	Kansas (15–0)	Kansas (18–0)	Missouri (17–1)	Missouri (19–1)	Missouri (21–1)	Kansas (24–1)	Missouri (24–2)	Kansas (27–2)	Oklahoma (23–4)	Oklahoma (26–4) (57)	1.
2.	LSU	Arizona (1–0)	Kansas (6–0)	Kansas (9–0)	Kansas (10–0)	Kansas (11–0)	Kansas (13–0)	Georgetown (11–0)	Georgetown (13–0)	Kansas (19–1)	Kansas (20–1)	Kansas (22–1)	Missouri (22–2)	Kansas (25–2)	UNLV (24–4)	Kansas (28–3)	UNLV (29–5) (3)	2.
3.	Syracuse	Georgetown (2–0)	Georgetown (3–0)	Georgetown (5–0)	Georgetown (7–0)	Georgetown (8–0)	Georgetown (9–0)	Michigan (10–1)	Oklahoma (12–0)	Georgetown (14–1)	Arkansas (17–2)	Arkansas (19–2)	Georgetown (19–2)	Duke (22–4)	Missouri (25–3)	UNLV (26–5)	Michigan State (26–5) (3)	3.
4.	Michigan	Kansas (4–0)	Missouri (4–0)	Missouri (7–0)	Missouri (9–0)	Illinois (8–0)	Illinois (10–0)	Oklahoma (10–0)	Missouri (15–1)	Louisville (14–2)	Michigan (15–3)	Duke (18–3)	Syracuse (18–3)	UNLV (22–4)	Connecticut (24–4)	Syracuse (22–5)	Connecticut (28–5)	4.
5.	Georgetown	Missouri (3–0)	UNLV (3–1)	Illinois (5–0)	Illinois (6–0)	Michigan (8–1)	Michigan (10–1)	Missouri (13–1)	Syracuse (12–1)	UNLV (12–3)	Duke (16–3)	Georgetown (17–2)	Michigan (18–4)	Georgetown (20–3)	Duke (23–5)	Georgetown (22–5)	Kansas (29–4)	5.
6.	Arizona	UNLV (3–1)	Duke (3–0)	Michigan (5–1)	Michigan (7–1)	Oklahoma (5–0)	Oklahoma (8–0)	Syracuse (10–1)	Michigan (11–2)	Arkansas (14–2)	Georgetown (15–2)	Syracuse (16–3)	Duke (19–4)	Connecticut (22–4)	Oklahoma (21–4)	Missouri (26–4)	Syracuse (24–6)	6.
7.	North Carolina	Duke (1–0)	Illinois (2–0)	Arkansas (5–0)	Oklahoma (4–0)	Missouri (9–1)	Missouri (10–1)	UNLV (9–2)	Illinois (12–1)	Michigan (13–3)	Syracuse (14–3)	Michigan (16–4)	UNLV (19–4)	Michigan (19–5)	Georgetown (21–4)	Michigan State (24–5)	Arkansas (26–4)	7.
8.	Illinois	Illinois (0–0)	Michigan (3–1)	Oklahoma (4–0)	LSU (4–1)	Louisville (8–1)	Louisville (9–1)	Illinois (11–1)	Duke (12–2)	Duke (13–3)	Purdue (15–2)	Connecticut (19–3)	Arkansas (20–3)	Georgia Tech (19–4)	Michigan (20–5)	Connecticut (25–5)	Georgetown (23–6)	8.
9.	Arkansas	LSU (1–1)	LSU (2–1)	LSU (4–1)	Louisville (7–1)	LSU (6–1)	Indiana (10–0)	Georgia Tech (10–0)	UNLV (10–3)	Oklahoma (12–2)	Oklahoma (14–2)	UNLV (16–4)	LSU (19–4)	Purdue (18–4)	Purdue (20–5)	Arkansas (23–4)	Georgia Tech (24–6)	9.
10.	Duke	Michigan (0–1)	Arkansas (3–0)	Louisville (6–1)	Arkansas (5–1)	Indiana (8–0)	UNLV (7–2)	Duke (10–2)	Louisville (12–2)	Illinois (13–3)	Louisville (14–3)	Purdue (16–3)	Connecticut (20–4)	Oklahoma (19–4)	Syracuse (20–5)	Purdue (21–6)	Purdue (21–7)	10.
11.	Missouri	Arkansas (2–0)	Louisville (3–1)	Indiana (6–0)	Indiana (7–0)	Arkansas (7–1)	LSU (6–1)	Louisville (10–2)	Georgia Tech (11–1)	Syracuse (12–3)	Illinois (15–3)	LSU (16–4)	Oklahoma (17–3)	Syracuse (18–5)	Georgia Tech (20–5)	La Salle (28–1)	Missouri (26–5)	11.
12.	Louisville	North Carolina (2–1)	Oklahoma (2–0)	Duke (3–2)	Duke (3–2)	UNLV (5–2)	Georgia Tech (8–0)	Arkansas (10–2)	Arkansas (12–2)	Indiana (13–2)	UNLV (14–4)	Illinois (16–4)	Purdue (17–4)	LSU (20–5)	Arkansas (22–4)	Duke (23–7)	La Salle (29–1)	12.
13.	UCLA	Louisville (2–1)	UCLA (3–0)	UCLA (4–0)	UNLV (4–2)	Duke (5–2)	Duke (8–2)	Indiana (10–1)	LSU (10–2)	Georgia Tech (12–2)	Connecticut (17–3)	Oklahoma (15–3)	Georgia Tech (16–4)	Arkansas (21–4)	La Salle (25–1)	Michigan (20–7)	Michigan (22–7)	13.
14.	Indiana	Indiana (1–0)	Indiana (3–0)	UNLV (3–2)	Georgia Tech (5–0)	Georgia Tech (6–0)	Arkansas (8–2)	LSU (8–2)	Indiana (12–2)	Purdue (13–2)	LSU (14–4)	La Salle (16–1)	La Salle (19–1)	La Salle (22–1)	Michigan State (22–5)	Georgia Tech (21–6)	Arizona (24–6)	14.
15.	Temple	UCLA (1–0)	St. John's (4–1)	Georgia Tech (3–0)	NC State (6–1)	Memphis State (6–1)	UCLA (8–1)	St. John's (13–2)	St. John's (14–3)	St. John's (16–3)	La Salle (15–1)	Louisville (16–4)	Illinois (17–5)	Michigan State (21–5)	LSU (21–6)	Arizona (21–6)	Duke (24–8)	15.
16.	Oklahoma	Temple (0–0)	Memphis State (3–0)	NC State (6–1)	Iowa (6–0)	UCLA (6–1)	St. John's (9–2)	Minnesota (10–1)	UCLA (11–2)	LSU (12–3)	UCLA (14–3)	Georgia Tech (14–4)	Oregon State (18–3)	Louisville (20–5)	Oregon State (21–4)	LSU (22–7)	Louisville (26–7)	16.
17.	Notre Dame	Oklahoma (0–0)	North Carolina (4–2)	Memphis State (4–1)	Memphis State (4–1)	St. John's (9–2)	La Salle (7–0)	NC State (11–2)	La Salle (10–1)	Oregon State (14–2)	Georgia Tech (12–4)	Minnesota (15–4)	Minnesota (16–5)	Oregon State (19–4)	Minnesota (19–6)	Clemson (23–6)	Clemson (24–8)	17.
18.	Pittsburgh	Pittsburgh (0–0)	Georgia Tech (2–0)	St. John's (5–2)	UCLA (4–1)	Iowa (7–1)	NC State (7–2)	Arizona (8–2)	Oregon State (12–2)	La Salle (12–1)	St. John's (17–4)	Oregon State (17–3)	Louisville (18–5)	Minnesota (17–6)	Illinois (19–6)	Louisville (23–7)	Illinois (21–7)	18.
19.	NC State	Notre Dame (0–0)	NC State (4–1)	Alabama (5–1)	St. John's (8–2)	NC State (7–2)	Arizona (5–2)	UCLA (9–2)	NC State (12–3)	Arizona (11–3)	Minnesota (14–4)	UCLA (15–4)	Loyola Marymount (19–4)	Illinois (18–6)	Xavier (23–2)	Minnesota (20–7)	LSU (22–8)	19.
20.	Minnesota	St. John's (3–1)	Arizona (1–2)	Arizona (2–2)	Alabama (6–1)	La Salle (6–0)	Iowa (8–1)	Memphis State (9–3)	Xavier (11–1)	Connecticut (15–3)	Loyola Marymount (15–3)	Loyola Marymount (17–4)	Arizona (16–4)	Xavier (21–2)	Clemson (22–5)	Illinois (20–7)	Minnesota (20–8)	20.
21.	Oklahoma State	Georgia Tech (1–0)	Alabama (4–0)	Iowa (6–0)	Oregon State (5–1)	Arizona (3–2)	Memphis State (7–3)	La Salle (8–1)	Loyola Marymount (11–3)	Minnesota (12–3)	Oregon State (15–3)	Xavier (17–2)	Michigan State (19–5)	Arizona (17–5)	Louisville (20–7)	Loyola Marymount (23–5)	Loyola Marymount (23–5)	21.
22.	Georgia Tech	Memphis State (2–0)	Pittsburgh (2–1)	Oklahoma State (4–1)	Arizona (2–2)	Alabama (7–2)	Alabama (9–2)	Oregon State (11–2)	Minnesota (10–3)	Loyola Marymount (13–3)	Indiana (13–4)	Arizona (14–4)	Xavier (19–2)	Loyola Marymount (20–5)	Loyola Marymount (22–5)	Oregon State (22–5)	Oregon State (22–6)	22.
23.	Florida	Oklahoma State (0–0)	Temple (2–1)	Oregon State (4–1)	La Salle (4–0)	Oregon State (6–2)	Oregon State (9–2)	Loyola Marymount (9–3)	Arizona (9–3)	UCLA (12–3)	Xavier (15–2)	Michigan State (17–5)	UCLA (16–5)	Clemson (20–5)	Arizona (19–6)	New Mexico State (25–3)	Alabama (24–8)	23.
24.	Memphis State	Florida (0–0)	Oregon State (3–0)	Florida (2–1)	Oklahoma State (6–2)	North Carolina (6–4)	Minnesota (8–1)	Alabama (10–3)	Purdue (11–2)	Alabama (13–4)	Arizona (12–4)	St. John's (17–6)	St. John's (19–6)	New Mexico State (21–3)	New Mexico State (23–3)	Xavier (24–3)	New Mexico State (26–4)	24.
25.	St. John's	NC State (1–1)	Florida (1–0)	Michigan State (6–0)	Michigan State (7–1)	Minnesota (7–1)	Loyola Marymount (7–2)	Xavier (9–1)	Alabama (12–3)	Xavier (13–2)	North Carolina (15–6)	Indiana (14–5)	New Mexico State (20–2)	Indiana (16–6)	Georgia (19–6)	Georgia (20–7)	Xavier (26–4)	25.
	Preseason Pre	Week 2 Nov. 27	Week 3 Dec. 5	Week 4 Dec. 12	Week 5 Dec. 19	Week 6 Dec. 26	Week 7 Jan. 2	Week 8 Jan. 9	Week 9 Jan. 16	Week 10 Jan. 23	Week 11 Jan. 30	Week 12 Feb. 6	Week 13 Feb. 13	Week 14 Feb. 20	Week 15 Feb. 27	Week 16 Mar. 6	Final Mar. 13	
		Dropped: Minnesota (0–1)	Dropped: Notre Dame (1–1); Oklahoma State (2–1)	Dropped: North Carolina (4–4); Pittsburgh (2–3); Temple (2–2)	Dropped: Florida (3–2)	Dropped: Oklahoma State (7–3); Michigan State (9–2)	Dropped: North Carolina (7–5)	Dropped: Iowa (8–3)	Dropped: Memphis State (10–4)	Dropped: NC State (12–5)	Dropped: Alabama (14–5)	Dropped: North Carolina (16–7)	Dropped: Indiana (14–6)	Dropped: St. John's (20–7)	Dropped: Indiana (16–8)	None	Dropped: Georgia (20–8)	

== Coaches Poll ==
	Preseason	Week 2 Nov. 27	Week 3 Dec. 5	Week 4 Dec. 12	Week 5 Dec. 19	Week 6 Dec. 26	Week 7 Jan. 2	Week 8 Jan. 9	Week 9 Jan. 16	Week 10 Jan. 23	Week 11 Jan. 30	Week 12 Feb. 6	Week 13 Feb. 13	Week 14 Feb. 20	Week 15 Feb. 27	Week 16 Mar. 6	Final Mar. 13	
1.	UNLV	Syracuse (0–0)	Syracuse (4–0)	Syracuse (6–0)	Syracuse (7–0)	Syracuse (8–0)	Syracuse (9–0)	Kansas (15–0)	Kansas (18–0)	Missouri (17–1)	Missouri (19–1)	Missouri (21–1)	Kansas (24–1)	Missouri (24–2)	Kansas (27–2)	Oklahoma (23–4)	Oklahoma (26–4) (34)	1.
2.	Syracuse	Kansas (4–0)	Kansas (6–0)	Kansas (9–0)	Kansas (10–0)	Kansas (11–0)	Kansas (13–0)	Georgetown (11–0)	Georgetown (13–0)	Kansas (19–1)	Kansas (20–1)	Kansas (22–1)	Georgetown (19–2)	Kansas (25–2)	Missouri (25–3)	Kansas (28–3)	UNLV (29–5) (3)	2.
3.	LSU	Arizona (1–0)	Georgetown (3–0)	Georgetown (5–0)	Georgetown (7–0)	Georgetown (8–0)	Georgetown (9–0)	Oklahoma (10–0)	Oklahoma (12–0)	Georgetown (14–1)	Arkansas (17–2)	Arkansas (19–2)	Syracuse (18–3)	Georgetown (20–3)	UNLV (24–4)	UNLV (26–5)	Connecticut (28–5)	3.
4.	Georgetown	Georgetown (2–0)	Missouri (4–0)	Missouri (7–0)	Missouri (9–0)	Illinois (8–0)	Illinois (10–0)	Michigan (10–1)	Missouri (15–1)	Louisville (14–2)	Michigan (15–3)	Duke (18–3)	Missouri (22–2)	Duke (22–4)	Duke (23–5)	Syracuse (22–5)	Michigan State (26–5) (1)	4.
5.	Michigan	UNLV (3–1)	UNLV (3–1)	Illinois (5–0)	Illinois (6–0)	Oklahoma (5–0)	Oklahoma (8–0) т	Missouri (13–1)	Syracuse (12–1)	UNLV (12–3)	Duke (16–3)	Georgetown (17–2)	Duke (19–4)	UNLV (22–4)	Georgetown (21–4)	Missouri (26–4)	Kansas (29–4)	5.
6.	Arizona	Missouri (3–0)	Duke (3–0)	Arkansas (5–0)	Michigan (7–1)	Michigan (8–1) т	Michigan (10–1) т	Syracuse (10–1)	Illinois (12–1)	Oklahoma (12–2)	Georgetown (15–2)	Syracuse (16–3)	Michigan (18–4)	Georgia Tech (19–4)	Connecticut (24–4)	Georgetown (22–5)	Syracuse (24–6) (1)	6.
7.	North Carolina	LSU (1–1)	Illinois (2–0)	Michigan (5–1)	Oklahoma (4–0)	Missouri (9–1) т	Missouri (10–1)	Illinois (11–1)	Michigan (11–2)	Duke (13–3)	Syracuse (14–3)	UNLV (16–4)	UNLV (19–4)	Purdue (18–4)	Oklahoma (21–4)	Connecticut (25–5)	Georgia Tech (24–6)	7.
8.	Illinois	Illinois (0–0)	LSU (2–1)	Oklahoma (4–0)	LSU (4–1)	Indiana (8–0)	Indiana (10–0)	UNLV (9–2)	Duke (12–2)	Michigan (13–3)	Oklahoma (14–2)	Michigan (16–4)	Arkansas (20–3)	Connecticut (22–4)	Michigan (20–5)	Michigan State (24–5)	Arkansas (26–4)	8.
9.	Duke	Arkansas (2–0)	Arkansas (3–0)	LSU (4–1)	Indiana (7–0)	UNLV (5–2)	UNLV (7–2)	Georgia Tech (10–0)	UNLV (10–3)	Arkansas (14–2)	Purdue (15–2)	Purdue (16–3)	LSU (19–4)	Syracuse (18–5)	Syracuse (20–5)	Purdue (21–6)	Georgetown (23–6)	9.
10.	Arkansas т	North Carolina (2–1)	Michigan (3–1)	Indiana (6–0)	Louisville (7–1)	Arkansas (7–1)	Louisville (9–1)	Louisville (10–2)	Louisville (12–2)	Syracuse (12–3)	UNLV (14–4)	Oklahoma (15–3)	Oklahoma (17–3)	Michigan (19–5)	Purdue (20–5)	Arkansas (23–4)	Purdue (21–7)	10.
11.	Missouri т	Duke (1–0)	Louisville (3–1)	Louisville (6–1)	Arkansas (5–1)	Louisville (8–1)	LSU (6–1)	Duke (10–2)	Georgia Tech (11–1)	Georgia Tech (12–2)	Illinois (15–3)	Connecticut (19–3)	Georgia Tech (16–4)	Oklahoma (19–4)	Georgia Tech (20–5)	Duke (23–7)	Missouri (26–5)	11.
12.	Indiana	Michigan (0–1)	Oklahoma (2–0)	UNLV (3–2)	UNLV (4–2)	LSU (6–1)	Georgia Tech (8–0)	Indiana (10–1)	LSU (10–2)	Illinois (13–3)	Louisville (14–3)	LSU (16–4)	Purdue (17–4)	Arkansas (21–4)	Arkansas (22–4)	La Salle (28–1)	Arizona (24–6)	12.
13.	UCLA	UCLA (1–0)	Indiana (3–0)	Duke (3–2)	Georgia Tech (5–0)	Georgia Tech (6–0)	Duke (8–2)	LSU (8–2)	Arkansas (12–2)	Purdue (13–2) т	LSU (14–4)	Illinois (16–4)	Connecticut (20–4)	LSU (20–5)	Michigan State (22–5)	Georgia Tech (21–6)	La Salle (29–1) (1)	13.
14.	Louisville	Indiana (1–0)	UCLA (3–0)	UCLA (4–0)	Duke (3–2)	Duke (5–2)	Arkansas (8–2)	Arkansas (10–2)	Indiana (12–2)	LSU (12–3) т	Connecticut (17–3)	Louisville (16–4)	La Salle (19–1)	La Salle (22–1)	La Salle (25–1)	Michigan (20–7)	Duke (24–8)	14.
15.	Georgia Tech	Louisville (2–1)	North Carolina (4–2)	NC State (6–1)	Iowa (6–0)	UCLA (6–1)	UCLA (8–1)	Minnesota (10–1)	UCLA (11–2)	Indiana (13–2)	La Salle (15–1) т	Georgia Tech (14–4)	Minnesota (16–5)	Louisville (20–5)	LSU (21–6) т	Clemson (23–6)	Michigan (22–7)	15.
16.	Oklahoma	Oklahoma (0–0)	Alabama (4–0)	Georgia Tech (3–0)	UCLA (4–1)	La Salle (6–0)	Colorado State (10–2)	St. John's (13–2)	Purdue (11–2)	Oregon State (14–2)	Georgia Tech (12–4) т	La Salle (16–1)	Oregon State (18–3)	Michigan State (21–5)	Oregon State (21–4) т	Arizona (21–6)	Louisville (26–7)	16.
17.	Temple	Temple (0–0)	Arizona (1–2)	Iowa (6–0)	Oregon State (5–1)	Arizona (3–2)	Iowa (8–1)	Arizona (8–2)	St. John's (14–3)	St. John's (16–3)	UCLA (14–3)	Oregon State (17–3)	Illinois (17–5)	Minnesota (17–6)	Illinois (19–6)	New Mexico State (25–3)	Clemson (24–8)	17.
18.	Pittsburgh	Oklahoma State (0–0)	Georgia Tech (2–0) т	Michigan State (6–0)	Alabama (6–1)	Virginia (8–1)	Alabama (9–2)	Loyola Marymount (9–3)	Xavier (11–1)	La Salle (12–1)	North Carolina (15–6)	Minnesota (15–4)	New Mexico State (20–2)	Oregon State (19–4)	Xavier (23–2)	Louisville (23–7)	Illinois (21–7)	18.
19.	Notre Dame	Georgia Tech (1–0)	NC State (4–1) т	Alabama (5–1)	St. John's (8–2)	North Carolina (6–4)	La Salle (7–0) т	UCLA (9–2)	Michigan State (14–2)	Connecticut (15–3)	St. John's (17–4)	New Mexico State (18–2)	Xavier (19–2)	Xavier (21–2) т	New Mexico State (23–3)	Illinois (20–7)	Alabama (24–8)	19.
20.	Oklahoma State	Florida (0–0)	Oregon State (3–0)	Oklahoma State (4–1)	Memphis (4–1) т Arkansas-Little Rock (3–0) т North Carolina (5–4) т	Iowa (7–1)	Arizona (5–2) т	Alabama (10–3)	La Salle (10–1)	Alabama (13–4)	Minnesota (14–4)	UCLA (15–4)	Loyola Marymount (19–4)	New Mexico State (21–3) т	Minnesota (19–6)	Minnesota (20–7)	New Mexico State (26–4)	20.
	Preseason	Week 2 Nov. 27	Week 3 Dec. 5	Week 4 Dec. 12	Week 5 Dec. 19	Week 6 Dec. 26	Week 7 Jan. 2	Week 8 Jan. 9	Week 9 Jan. 16	Week 10 Jan. 23	Week 11 Jan. 30	Week 12 Feb. 6	Week 13 Feb. 13	Week 14 Feb. 20	Week 15 Feb. 27	Week 16 Mar. 6	Final Mar. 13	
		Dropped: Pittsburgh (0–0); Notre Dame (0–0)	Dropped: Temple (2–1); Oklahoma State (2–1); Florida (1–0)	Dropped: North Carolina (4–4); Arizona (2–2); Oregon State (4–1)	Dropped: NC State (6–1); Michigan State (7–1); Oklahoma State (6–2)	Dropped: Oregon State (6–2); Alabama (7–2); St. John's (9–2); Memphis (6–1); Arkansas-Little Rock (4–2)	Dropped: Virginia (8–1); North Carolina (8–5)	Dropped: Colorado State (10–3); Iowa (8–3); La Salle (8–1)	Dropped: Minnesota (10–3); Arizona (9–3); Loyola Marymount (11–3); Alabama (12–3)	Dropped: UCLA (12–3); Xavier (13–2); Michigan State (15–3)	Dropped: Indiana (13–4); Oregon State (15–3); Alabama (14–5)	Dropped: North Carolina (16–7); St. John's (17–6)	Dropped: Louisville (18–5); UCLA (16–5)	Dropped: Illinois (18–6); Loyola Marymount (20–5)	Dropped: Louisville (20–7)	Dropped: LSU (22–7); Oregon State (22–5); Xavier (24–3)	Dropped: Minnesota (20–8)	
