= Wisconsin Field House =

University sports arena in Madison, Wisconsin, United States

Coordinates: 43.068613°N 89.412921°W

The Wisconsin Field House
- UW Field House
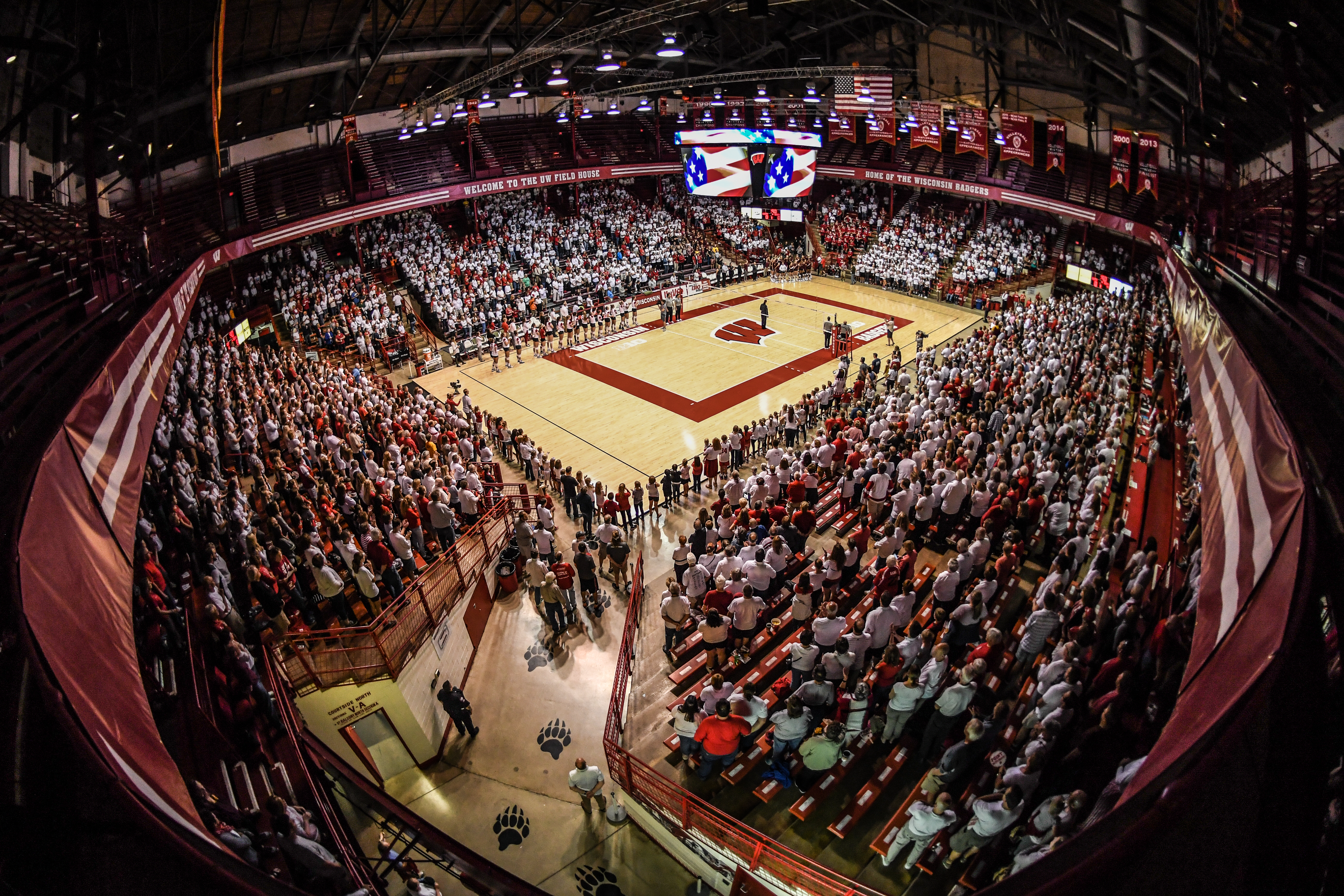
- A volleyball match at the field house in 2017
- Interactive map of The Wisconsin Field House
- Location: 1450 Monroe St. Madison, WI 53711
- Owner: University of Wisconsin–Madison
- Operator: University of Wisconsin–Madison
- Capacity: 7,229 (2022-present); 7,540 (2021); 7,052 (2018–2020); 6,012 (1998–2018); 10,600 (1977–1998); 12,000 (1939–1977); 8,000 (1929–1939)
- Public transit: Metro Transit

Construction
- Groundbreaking: September 26, 1929; 96 years ago
- Opened: December 13, 1930; 95 years ago
- Cost: $434,000
- Architects: Arthur Peabody, Paul Cret, William Christenson

Tenants
- Wisconsin Badgers men's basketball (1930–1998); Wisconsin Badgers women's basketball (1974–1998); Wisconsin Badgers women's volleyball (1986–present); Wisconsin Badgers wrestling (1930–present); Wisconsin Badgers boxing (1933–1960); WIAA State Boys Basketball Tournament (1930–1935, 1937–1997); WIAA State Girls Basketball Tournament (1976–1997, 1999–2000, 2002); WIAA State Wrestling Tournament (1930–1997, 2005–2025)
- University of Wisconsin Field House
- U.S. National Register of Historic Places
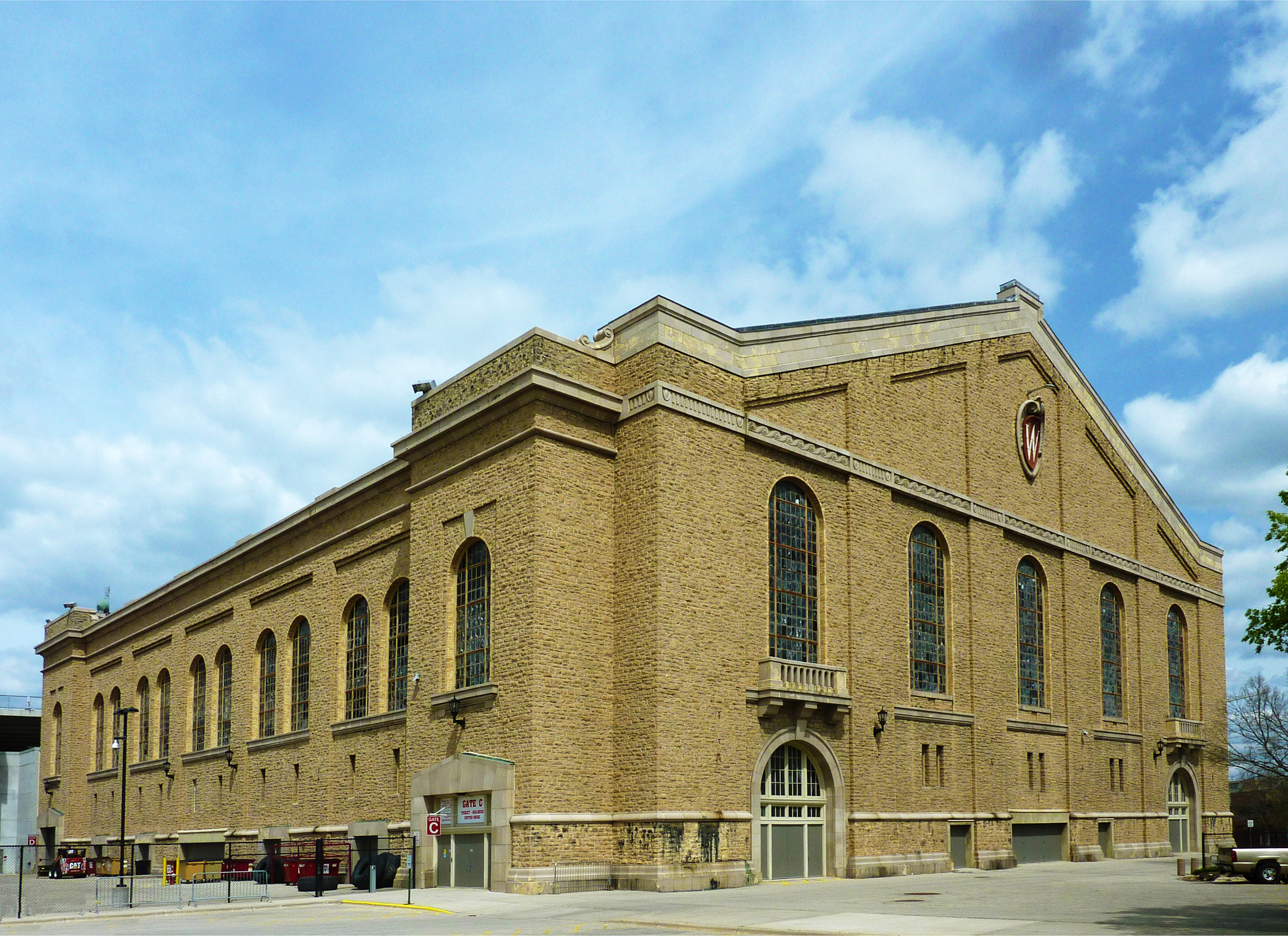
- Area: 2 acres (0.81 ha)
- Architectural style: Italian Renaissance
- NRHP reference No.: 98000829
- Added to NRHP: July 1, 1998

The Wisconsin Field House (commonly known as the UW Field House) is a multi-purpose arena owned by the University of Wisconsin–Madison and located directly south of Camp Randall Stadium. In addition to sports events, the Field House has been the site of large community gatherings such as convocations and concerts. It was added to the National Register of Historic Places in 1998.

== History ==
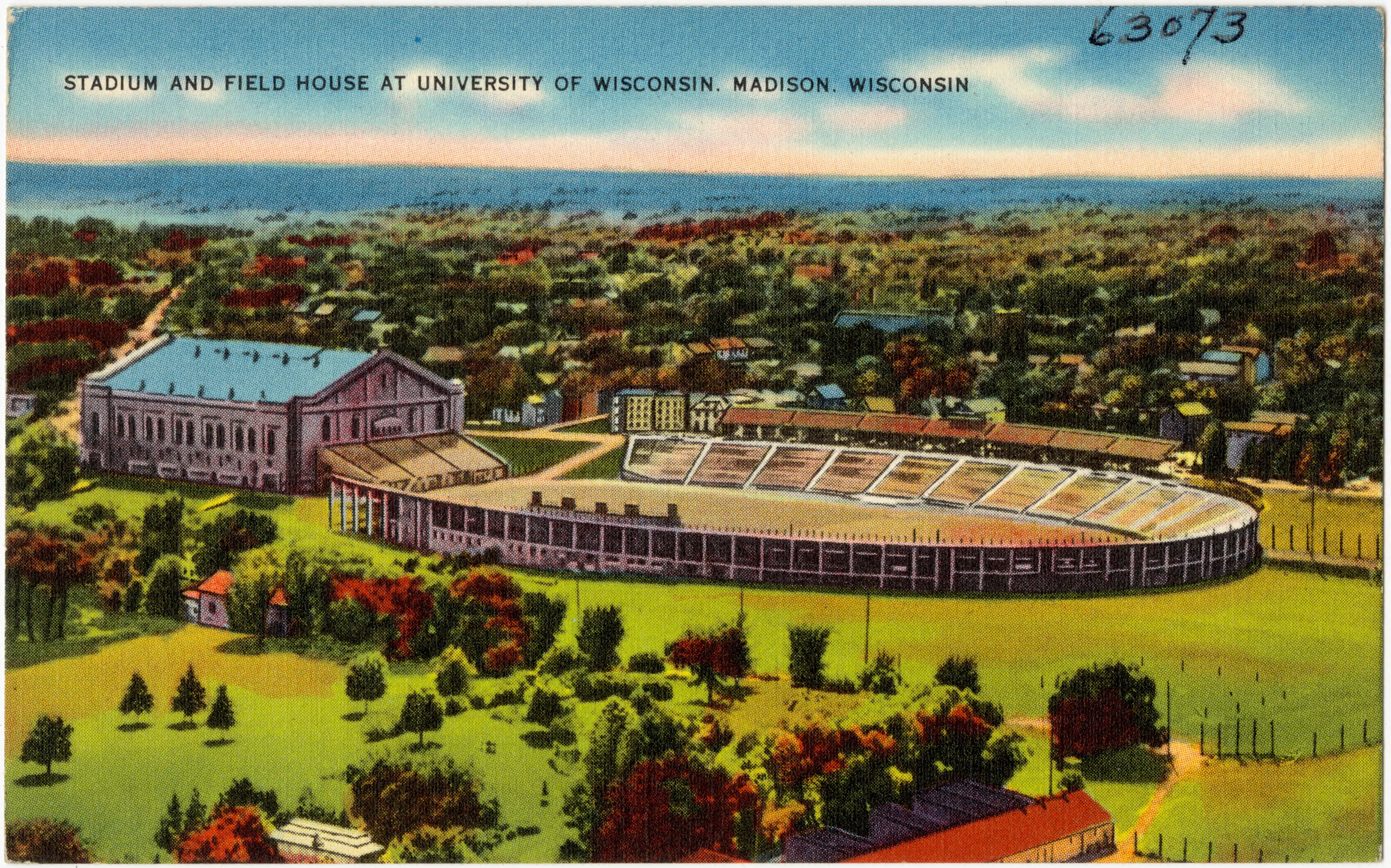
A postcard showing the field house, c. 1930s

The UW began supporting team sporting events in the 1800s. In 1892 the university completed the Red Gym for indoor sports, and in 1893 it bought Camp Randall to use as playing fields. Basketball was played at the UW beginning 1898 and grew in popularity, but the Red Gym seated only 2240 spectators, and was referred to as "the little cigar box gym."

In 1925 the UW regents began discussing a larger space. With pushing from athletic director George Little the new UW Field House was dedicated in 1930. William F. Stevens and John Knudsen designed it in Renaissance Revival style, working under State Architect Arthur Peabody. That style and the Madison sandstone which covers the exterior align with a master plan for the UW campus that Peabody had laid out with Warren Laird and Paul Cret in 1909, loosely matching the style of the campus's earliest buildings North Hall, South Hall, and Bascom Hall. The Field House has a concrete foundation, a steel framework within concrete walls clad in sandstone and decorated with dressed and carved limestone, and a gable roof covered with red clay tiles. The simple interior design of two large galleries worked so well that it influenced the design of other field houses.

The new Field House opened in 1930, with 9000 attending a dedication and a basketball game against Pennsylvania. It housed a successful college boxing program from 1933 until 1960. It hosted the 1941 NCAA basketball tournament East Regionals, won by the Badgers, who would go on to win the national title that year in Kansas City. It is where in 1941 the UW President told the students about the bombing of Pearl Harbor. In 1945 it hosted a celebration of Germany's surrender. It was home to the Wisconsin Badgers basketball team before that team moved to Kohl Center. Currently the building is used by the volleyball and wrestling teams. The Wisconsin volleyball team got its first-ever sellout on October 21, 2007, when they hosted No. 1 Penn State.

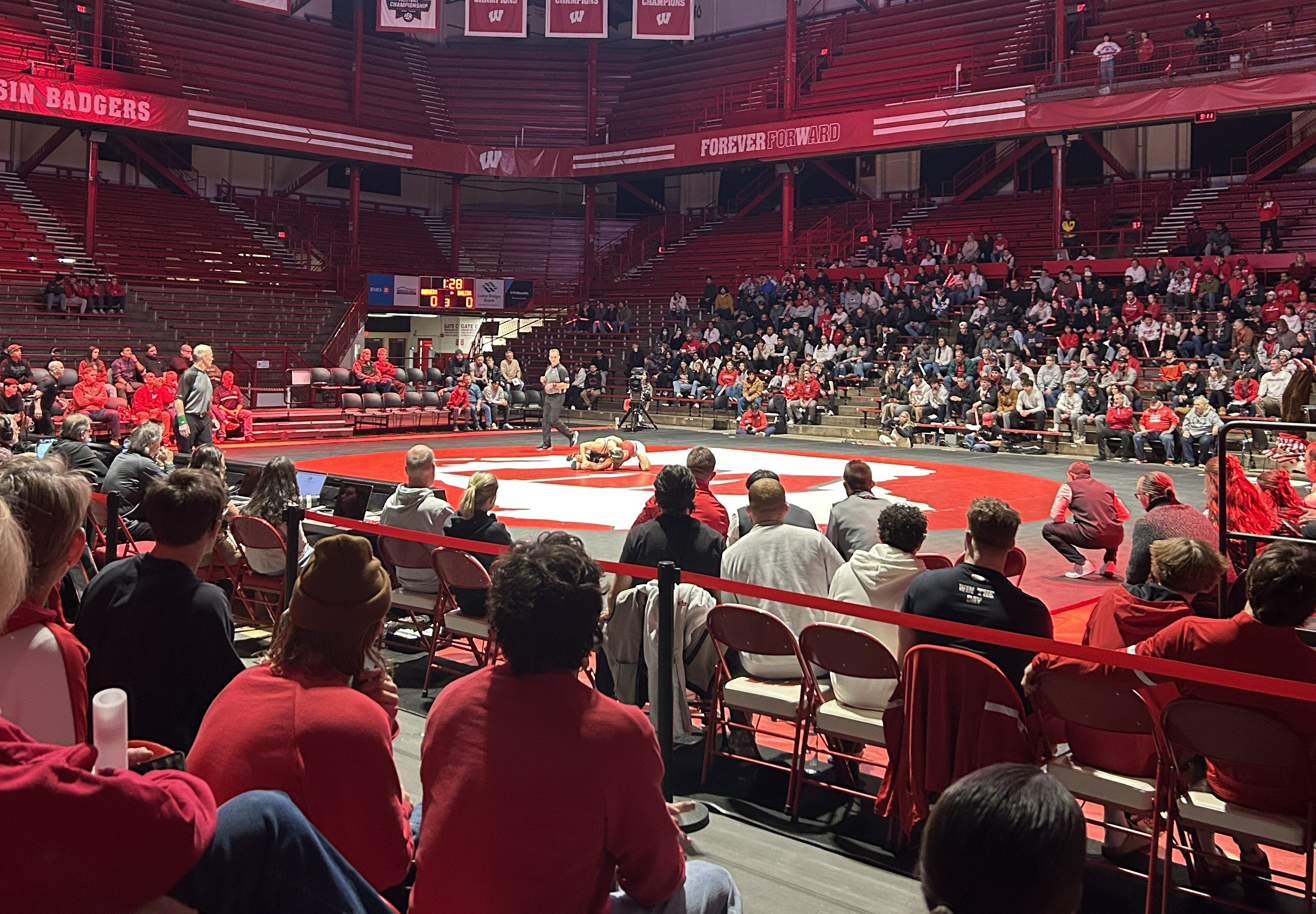
2025 wrestling meet at the arena

When the Field House opened in 1929, a single level of seating provided a capacity of 8,000. A balcony added in 1939 brought the capacity to 12,000. Later renovations reduced capacity to 10,600 for basketball. After the men's and women's basketball teams moved to the Kohl Center in 1998, the balcony was closed due to concerns over code violations, giving a reduced capacity of 6,012. Recent sellouts for women's volleyball matches prompted plans for renovating and reopening several sideline sections of the balcony, allowing a capacity of 7,052 for women's volleyball. A project to refurbish the exterior facade, replace windows, and create a pedestrian plaza between the Field House and Regent Street began in April 2020 and was substantially complete by the fall of 2020.

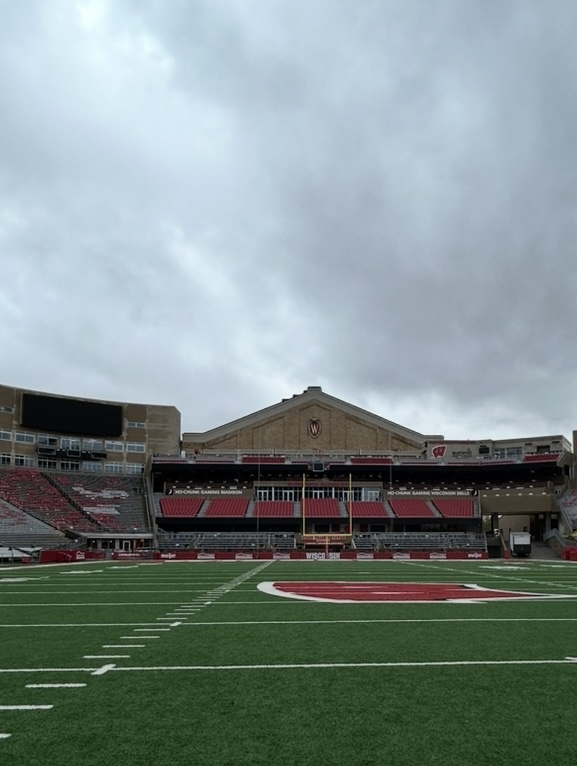
The "W" crest at the top of the Field House seen from Camp Randall Stadium.

The "W" crest at the top of the Field House, whose actual designer is unknown, is frequently employed as the emblem of the University of Wisconsin–Madison.

=== Trivia ===
The Field House hosted Milwaukee Bucks home playoff games in 1970, 1971 and 1973, along with a variety of Wisconsin high school sports events.
