= Patiño =

Patiño or Patino is a surname of Hispanic origin. The name refers to:

== From Bolivia ==
- Simón Iturri Patiño (1862–1947), Bolivian tycoon (industrialist and mine owner) ranked among the five richest men in the world
  - Antenor Patiño (1896–1982), Bolivian tycoon, heir to Simón Iturri Patiño
- Adrián Patiño (1895–1951), Bolivian military musician
- Beatriz Canedo Patiño (contemporary), Bolivian fashion designer
- Jaime Ortiz-Patiño (1930–2013), Bolivian art collector, golf course owner and former President of the World Bridge Federation.

== Others ==
- Alejandro Patino (contemporary), American television actor
- Baltasar Patiño, 1st Marquis of Castelar, Spain/Italy
- Basilio Martín Patino (1930–2017), Spanish film director
- Carlos Patiño (1600–1675), Spanish Baroque composer
- Carlos Patino (footballer) (born 1995), Colombian footballer
- Charlie Patino (born 2003), English association footballer with Spanish heritage
- Chía Patiño (born 1967), Ecuadorian composer and arts administrator
- Christian Patiño (born 1975), Mexican footballer and manager
- Cristian Patiño (born 1980), Argentine footballer
- David Patiño (born 1967), Mexican footballer and manager
- Éder Patiño (born 1984), Mexican footballer
- Elisa Patiño Meléndez (1890–1919), the first women of Galician descent to become a pilot
- Hernán Patiño (1966–1995), Colombian road cyclist
- Jairo Patiño (born 1978), Colombian footballer
- Javier Patiño (born 1988), Filipino footballer
- Jayson Patino (born 1983), American Jiu Jitsu practitioner
- Jorge Patiño (born 1911), Peruvian sports shooter
- Jorge Patino (born 1973), Brazilian mixed martial artist
- José Patiño (1666–1736), Spanish statesman
- Juan Patiño (footballer, born 1989), Paraguayan footballer
- Juan Patiño (footballer, born 2001), Colombian footballer
- Lionelo Patiño (1920–1987), Peruvian shot putter
- Luis Patiño (baseball) (born 1999), Colombian baseball player
- Luis Patiño (tennis) (born 1993), Mexican tennis player
- Maria José Martínez-Patiño (born 1961), Spanish intersex hurdler at the 1985 World University Games
- María Patiño (born 1971), Spanish journalist and presenter
- Miguel Patiño Velázquez (1938–2019), Mexican Roman Catholic bishop
- Milton Patiño (born 1973), Colombian footballer
- Nataly Patiño (born 1999 or 2000), Colombian vallenato accordionist
- Odin Patiño (born 1983), Mexican footballer
- Paula Patiño (born 1997), Colombian racing cyclist
- Pedro Patiño Ixtolinque (1774–1835), Mexican sculptor
- Ricardo Patiño (born 1954), Ecuadorian politician
- Roberto Patino, American screenwriter and television writer
- Rosalba Patiño (born 1960), Colombian chess master
- Santiago Patiño (born 1997), Colombian footballer
- Victor Patiño-Fomeque (born 1959), Colombian narcotics trafficker with the Cali cartel
- Yeray Patiño (born 1991), Spanish footballer, known as Yeray

== See also ==
- Pitino, surname
