= Carmen Helena Téllez =

Venezuelan conductor

Carmen-Helena Téllez (25 September 1955, Caracas, Venezuela-10 December 2021, South Bend, Indiana) was a Venezuelan-American music conductor, producer, and composer. Reviewed as "a quiet force behind contemporary music in the United States today", she was a pioneer of new modes of classical music presentation, through the exploration of the relationship of music with other arts and technology as well as through the discovery of underrepresented composers (especially women and Latin American authors) with multiple performances of contemporary works for chorus, orchestra and new opera.

== Career ==
=== Conducting ===
She conducted in the United States, Europe, Israel, and Latin America. After her tenure as music director of the National Chorus of Spain, she joined the music faculty at Indiana University in 1992, as director of the Latin American Music Center and the Contemporary Vocal Ensemble. For these organizations, she commissioned and recorded several new works, produced 14 CDs of Latin American music, and organized several Inter-American Composition Workshops. During the 2001-2002 period, she was the resident conductor of the pioneering Contemporary Chamber Players of Chicago and became the music director of the Pocket Opera Players in New York City.

Throughout her life, Téllez was known as a conductor of new music, even as she remained active conducting canonic repertoire. She is the first woman on record to conduct Berlioz's Grande Messe des Morts (Indiana University, 2000). In the year 2001, she conducted the American Midwest premiere of John Adams' El Niño, and in 2002 she conducted Stephen Hartke's Tituli and the second-ever performance of Ralph Shapey's oratorio "Praise". She was responsible for several commissions and world premieres, including John Eaton's opera Inasmuch and his Mass for vocal-instrumental ensemble. Téllez also performed the Midwest premieres of many important compositions, including James MacMillan's Seven Last Words, Alfred Schnittke's Requiem and Lou Harrison's Orpheus. In July 2006, Téllez conducted the world premiere of MacMillan's Sun-Dogs which she had co-commissioned. In October 2007 she conducted the collegiate premiere of Osvaldo Golijov's opera Ainadamar. In August 2008 she produced and conducted the world premiere of Gabriela Ortiz's opera ¡Únicamente la verdad! In 2011 she also premiered a new interdisciplinary version of "Passion with Tropes" by Don Freund. She also commissioned and premiered the oratorio Paradiso by Robert Kyr, and recorded the anthology of works based on poetry by Sor Juana Inés de la Cruz by MacArthur Award winner John Eaton.

With Chía Patiño, artistic director of Ecuador's Teatro Nacional Sucre, she developed a version in 2018 of The Magic Flute, La flauta mágica de los Andes, featuring aspects of Andean mythology while rewriting and completing a proposed transcription using Ecuadorian instruments.

=== Consulting and research ===
As a scholar and conductor, she won numerous grants and awards from the US-Mexico Fund for Culture, the Rockefeller Foundation, the Indiana Arts Commission, the United States Information Agency, and the Circle of Music and Theater Critics of Mexico. She was a respected consultant with international organizations on contemporary composers and on Latin American music, and wrote several articles on these subjects for the New Grove Dictionary of Music. Indiana University awarded her the Tracy Sonneborn Award for the integration of creativity and teaching in 2010.

In 1996, she founded Aguavá New Music Studio, with composer Cary Boyce. With this organization, she recorded two CDs. Her current research and performance interests involved the inter-disciplinary presentation of new music, in order to enhance the connection of composers with the concerns of present-day audiences and reassess the ritual role of art in our time. In 2014, she founded the collective Kosmologia, to advance new modes of music presentation.

In 2012, she became Professor of Conducting at the University of Notre Dame, where she founded the doctoral Choral Conducting program and led a series of musical works with new modes of interdisciplinary presentation. She won a grant from the Andrew W. Mellon Foundation to develop projects in sacred music drama for her research project, Notre Dame Vocale, between 2012 and 2016.

Carmen-Helena Téllez held a Doctor of Music degree from Indiana University, and was the winner of the ACDA Julius Herford National Choral Dissertation Award (1991).

== Death ==
She died on December 10, 2021, at her home in South Bend, Indiana.
