= Naidich =

Naidich is a surname. Notable people with the surname include:

- Martín Naidich (born 1990), Argentine swimmer
- Susana Naidich (born 1932), Argentine singer, musicologist, phonologist, voice teacher, and speech-language pathologist
