= 1989–90 Kentucky Wildcats men's basketball team =

1989–90 season of University of Kentucky men's basketball team

1989–90 Kentucky Wildcats men's basketball
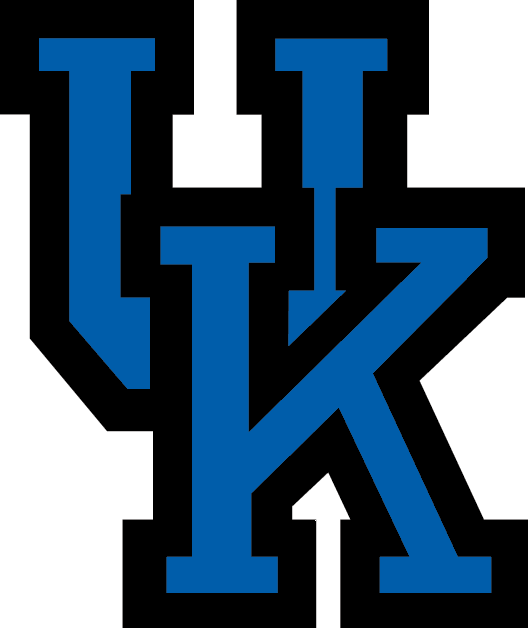
- Conference: Southeastern Conference
- Record: 14–14 (10–8 SEC)
- Head coach: Rick Pitino (1st season)
- Assistant coaches: Herb Sendek; Billy Donovan; Tubby Smith; Ralph Willard
- Home arena: Rupp Arena

1989–90 Southeastern Conference men's basketball standings
	Conf.				Overall
Team	W		L	PCT	W		L	PCT
Georgia	13	–	5	.722	20	–	9	.690
No. 23 Alabama †	12	–	6	.667	26	–	9	.743
No. 19 LSU	12	–	6	.667	23	–	9	.719
Tennessee	10	–	8	.556	16	–	14	.533
Kentucky	10	–	8	.556	14	–	14	.500
Ole Miss	8	–	10	.444	13	–	17	.433
Auburn	8	–	10	.444	13	–	18	.419
Mississippi State	7	–	11	.389	16	–	14	.533
Vanderbilt	7	–	11	.389	21	–	14	.600
Florida	3	–	15	.167	7	–	21	.250
† 1990 SEC tournament winner Rankings from AP poll

The 1989–90 Kentucky Wildcats men's basketball team represented University of Kentucky in the 1989–90 NCAA Division I men's basketball season. The head coach was Rick Pitino and the team finished the season with an overall record of 14–14. Coming off the controversy of the Eddie Sutton scandal, the NCAA banned the Kentucky Wildcats from television for one season. The NCAA sanctions placed on the program would also ban any postseason competition for two years and a three-year probational period. Pitino knew this and still took the challenge of making this team successful despite the many deficient parts of the program.

Coming off a decent season in the NBA with the Knicks, Pitino missed the college experience and felt that Kentucky would be the most interesting choice. Pitino was reportedly offered six million dollars for a seven-year contract with Kentucky. Coming into the new season, not all of Kentucky's players were completely committed to playing due to the program being in shambles. Some players were reported to have skipped class or not put forth 100% effort into practices. Ironically, the students that did not compete were focusing more on their grades so they could graduate. Despite Rick Pitino's intense coaching effort, the season included many difficult moments for the Wildcats, including a 150–95 loss to Kansas (which is the largest margin of defeat in Kentucky history). Despite all these obstacles, the Wildcats finished with a respectable .500 record, and Pitino was named SEC Coach of the Year (for the first of three times) for guiding Kentucky to a 10–8 record in conference and was named the Basketball Times National Coach of the Year in 1990.

== Roster ==
1989–90 Kentucky Wildcats men's basketball team
Players
Coaches

Pos.	#	Name	Height	Weight	Year	Previous school	Hometown
G	4	Derrick Miller	6 ft 6 in (1.98 m)	170 lb (77 kg)	Sr	Bible Baptist School	Savannah, GA
G	11	Sean Woods	6 ft 2 in (1.88 m)	180 lb (82 kg)	So	Cathedral HS	Indianapolis, IN
F	12	Deron Feldhaus	6 ft 7 in (2.01 m)	210 lb (95 kg)	So	Mason County HS	Maysville, KY
G	14	Jeff Brassow	6 ft 5 in (1.96 m)	195 lb (88 kg)	Fr	Elsik HS	Houston, TX
G	20	Tony Cooper	5 ft 9 in (1.75 m)	150 lb (68 kg)	Fr	Windsor Forest HS	Savannah, GA
F	21	Henry Thomas	6 ft 5 in (1.96 m)	160 lb (73 kg)	Fr	Clarksville HS	Clarksville, TN
G	23	Junior Braddy	6 ft 3 in (1.91 m)	190 lb (86 kg)	Fr	Middleburg HS	Jacksonville, FL
G	25	Skip McGaw	6 ft 4 in (1.93 m)	190 lb (86 kg)	Jr	North Hopkins HS	Madisonville, KY
G	32	Richie Farmer	6 ft 0 in (1.83 m)	170 lb (77 kg)	So	Clay County HS	Manchester, KY
F	33	Johnathon Davis	6 ft 8 in (2.03 m)	200 lb (91 kg)	So	Pine Forest HS	Pensacola, FL
G/F	34	John Pelphrey	6 ft 7 in (2.01 m)	195 lb (88 kg)	So	Paintsville HS	Paintsville, KY
F/C	35	Reggie Hanson	6 ft 7 in (2.01 m)	200 lb (91 kg)	Jr	Pulaski County HS	Somerset, KY
G	42	Michael Parks	6 ft 3 in (1.91 m)	180 lb (82 kg)	Fr	Breckinridge County HS	Irvington, KY

Head coach

Rick Pitino (UMass)

Assistant coach(es)

- Ralph Willard (Holy Cross)
- Tubby Smith (High Point)
- Herb Sendek (Carnegie Mellon)
- Billy Donovan (Providence)

Legend

- (C) Team captain
- (S) Suspended
- (I) Ineligible
- (W) Walk-on
- Injured
- Current redshirt

== Personnel ==
In the wake of the previous season's alleged scandal, Pitino brought in new assistant coaches. One of which was a close friend of his, Ralph Willard. He would leave the New York Knicks to follow Pitino to Kentucky. Tubby Smith left his position as assistant coach at the University of South Carolina to pursue his new career at the University of Kentucky. Herb Sendek was also brought in as an assistant coach. Sendek had previously served as a graduate assistant to Pitino at Providence College. Pitino brought in Billy Donovan as the graduate assistant coach. This would be after a short career on Wall Street and a stint playing in the Continental Basketball Association.

== Schedule and results ==
Date time, TV	Rank^{#}	Opponent^{#}	Result	Record	Site city, state
Regular Season
November 28, 1989*		Ohio	W 76–73	1–0	Rupp Arena; Lexington, Kentucky
December 2, 1989*		No. 14 Indiana; Rivalry	L 69–71	1–1	RCA Dome; Indianapolis, Indiana
December 4, 1989		Mississippi State	W 102–97	2–1 (1–0)	Rupp Arena; Lexington, Kentucky
December 6, 1989*		Tennessee Tech	W 111–75	3–1	Rupp Arena; Lexington, Kentucky
December 9, 1989*		at No. 2 Kansas	L 95–150	3–2	Allen Fieldhouse; Lawrence, Kansas
December 19, 1989*		Furman	W 104–73	4–2	Rupp Arena; Lexington, Kentucky
December 22, 1989*		Portland	W 88–71	5–2	Rupp Arena; Lexington, Kentucky
December 23, 1989*		Southwestern Louisiana	L 113–116 ^{OT}	5–3	Rupp Arena; Lexington, Kentucky
December 27, 1989*		No. 24 North Carolina	L 110–121	5–4	Freedom Hall; Louisville, Kentucky
December 30, 1989*		No. 8 Louisville	L 79–86	5–5	Rupp Arena; Lexington, Kentucky
January 3, 1990		at Georgia	L 91–106	5–6 (1–1)	Stegeman Coliseum; Athens, Georgia
January 6, 1990		at Vanderbilt	L 85–92	5–7 (1–2)	Memorial Gymnasium; Nashville, Tennessee
January 10, 1990		Florida	W 89–81	6–7 (2–2)	Rupp Arena; Lexington, Kentucky
January 13, 1990		at No. 14 LSU	L 81–94	6–8 (2–3)	Maravich Assembly Center; Baton Rouge, Louisiana
January 17, 1990		No. 25 Alabama	W 82–65	7–8 (3–3)	Rupp Arena; Lexington, Kentucky
January 20, 1990		Tennessee	W 95–83	8–8 (4–3)	Rupp Arena; Lexington, Kentucky
January 24, 1990		at Auburn	L 70–74	8–9 (4–4)	Memorial Coliseum; Auburn, Alabama
January 27, 1990		Ole Miss	W 98–79	9–9 (5–4)	Rupp Arena; Lexington, Kentucky
January 31, 1990		at Mississippi State	L 86–87	9–10 (5–5)	Humphrey Coliseum; Starkville, Mississippi
February 3, 1990		Georgia	W 88–77	10–10 (6–5)	Rupp Arena; Lexington, Kentucky
February 7, 1990		Vanderbilt	W 100–73	11–10 (7–5)	Rupp Arena; Lexington, Kentucky
February 12, 1990		at Florida	W 78–74	12–10 (8–5)	O'Connell Center; Gainesville, Florida
February 15, 1990		No. 9 LSU	W 100–95	13–10 (9–5)	Rupp Arena; Lexington, Kentucky
February 17, 1990		at Alabama	L 58–83	13–11 (9–6)	Coleman Coliseum; Tuscaloosa, Alabama
February 21, 1990		at Tennessee	L 100–102	13–12 (9–7)	Thompson-Boling Arena; Knoxville, Tennessee
February 24, 1990		Auburn	W 98–95	14–12 (10–7)	Rupp Arena; Lexington, Kentucky
February 28, 1990		Ole Miss	L 74–88	14–13 (10–8)	Tad Smith Coliseum; Oxford, Mississippi
March 5, 1990		at Notre Dame	L 67–80	14–14	Joyce Center; South Bend, Indiana
*Non-conference game. ^{#}Rankings from AP Poll. (#) Tournament seedings in parentheses. SE=Southeast.
