= Cary Boyce =

American artistic director

Cary Boyce (born October, 29 1955) is artistic co-director and composer-in-residence of Aquavá New Music Studio, a musical production company and ensemble he developed with conductor Carmen-Helena Téllez and producer/flutist Alain Barker, which specializes in producing projects involving contemporary music.

Boyce's music has been heard around the world on nationally syndicated public radio and television, in concerts and festivals, and in two films by Prix-de-Rome-winning director Evelyne Clavaud, Aria ou les rumeurs de la Villa Medicís and her artistic documentary, André Pieyre de Mandiargues: L'amateur d'imprudence about the French Surrealist author. Boyce’s credits include the cycle for chorus and string quartet, A Garden of Roses, about which the newspaper The Spokesman Review stated, “The work is important because it is good in every way music can be good and it can provide pleasure to audiences of every age, cultural background, and level of sophistication ...” He also provided original music and the soundtrack for the PBS documentaries Harp Dreams (Emmy Award, 2011) and American Horizons: The Photography of Art Sinsabaugh, part of this exhibit at the Art Institute of Chicago.

Boyce’s oratorio, Dreams within a Dream, the subject of a public radio special released in 2004, was awarded a 2006 ASCAP-Rudolf Nissim "Special Distinction" Prize. Boyce’s music has been featured on the Dale Warland Singers’ Cathedral Classics radio special. His music performed by his Aquavá ensemble has been featured on such syndicated programs as Harmonia, Center Stage from Wolftrap, and in Europe on Deutsche Welle. His cantata, Ave Maris Stella, was premiered by Aguavá New Music Studio at the International Cervantino Festival in Mexico, and subsequently broadcast throughout Latin America. His Hodie Christus natus est premiered at Washington National Cathedral's 50th anniversary holiday concert. His string quartet, Nightshade, was recorded for Aguavá by the Corigliano String Quartet, prompting the online new music journal Sequenza 21 comment, “Nightshade is for classical music fans who know where ‘Freddy the Freeloader’ comes from… Hey MacArthur folks! Give that boy a grant and some Ritalin so he can spend more time composing!”

Boyce was born in Santa Rosa, California, United States, and raised in Sacramento where he found his first musical training singing high school choruses and taught himself to play the piano, “Poorly,” he says, “but I got better.” He went on to earn a bachelor of music degree with a double major in voice and theory/composition (voice studies with Claudia Kitka and piano with Frank Wasko) at California State University, Sacramento, subsequent piano studies with Thomas Hulse, and later a master of music degree at the University of North Texas under the compositional guidance of Martin Mailman with a cognate in piano studying with Joseph Banowetz. He earned his doctorate at the Indiana University Bloomington Jacobs School of Music with composition teachers Eugene O'Brien and Claude Baker with minors in conducting (with teachers Jan Harrington and Robert Porco) and music theory, and further piano studies with Asaf Zohar.

Boyce trained as a figure skater since he was 16, and skated with Holiday on Ice in Europe for a time in the early 1980s—an experience that added to his love of ballet and dance genres. He left professional skating to pursue a Master of Music degree at the University of North Texas, while teaching figure skating for the Ice Capades Chalet at the Dallas Galleria.

Boyce’s education was assisted by scholarships and teaching fellowships while he worked steadily as a church and synagogue musician, a practice that shaped his understanding of choral genres. Between degrees, Boyce traveled widely through the United States and Europe. Upon settling in Bloomington, Indiana after his doctoral studies, he pursued a career based on his commitment to the idea of the composer as a voice for the community. He has been an active participant in artistic and musical outreach endeavors, not only as a composer, but also as a producer and music essayist with public radio, online journals, major orchestras, and community presses. While working in Bloomington, Indiana, he served at WFIU Public Radio variously as marketing director, operations director, and station manager.
