= Notus (disambiguation) =

Notus is the god of the south wind in Greek mythology.

Notus may also refer to:

- Notus, Idaho, a small rural city in the United States
- NOTUS, the Contemporary Vocal Ensemble, a university-based singing group
- NOTUS (website), former name of the Washington Sun nonprofit news website
- Notus (insect), a genus of leafhoppers in the tribe Dikraneurini
