= Alexandra du Bois =

- Origin: Virginia Beach, Virginia
- Genres: Classical; Contemporary classical
- Occupations: Composer, musician
- Instruments: Violin, piano
- Years active: 1999–present
- Website: www.AlexandraduBois.com

Alexandra du Bois (/duː ˈbwɑː/; born August 16, 1981) is an American composer, violinist and educator who has received international critical acclaim for her chamber, orchestral and vocal compositions. She currently lives in New York and Vermont.

== Biography ==
Born in Virginia Beach, Virginia, in 1981, du Bois later moved to rural, south-eastern Virginia with her parents at the age of thirteen. After moving to Cambridge, Massachusetts, she began her formal training in composition with Osvaldo Golijov, Howard Frazin, and David Patterson and continued her training on violin with Lynn Chang and Sophie Vilker. At age sixteen, she began studies at the University of Massachusetts Boston and the Longy School of Music. She credits the solitude of the ocean and rural farmland as a child to her first impetus to start composing.

A graduate of The Juilliard School and the Indiana University Jacobs School of Music with a Master of Music and a Bachelor of Music degree, respectively, du Bois began her earliest musical training on the violin at age two with Suzanne Schreck. While at Indiana University, she studied under the direction of composers Sven-David Sandström, Claude Baker and Don Freund and violinists Federico Agostini and Henryk Kowalski; at Juilliard, du Bois' sole teacher in composition was Christopher Rouse.

Du Bois has previously been composer-in-residence at Carnegie Hall through The Weill Music Institute's Professional Training Workshop: Kronos: Signature Works, Dartmouth College, Mammoth Lakes Music Festival, and Merkin Concert Hall through the Zoom: Composers Close Up series. In 2010, du Bois was composer-in-residence with Southwest Chamber Music throughout L.A. and Vietnam which preceded an artist residency at the Harrison House in Joshua Tree.

== Du Bois' music ==
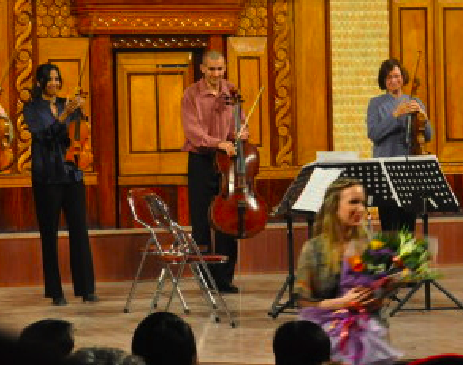
Alexandra du Bois in Hanoi, Vietnam in 2010 (bottom right)

The music of du Bois appears to consistently attract commissions of commemorative connotation; in honor of the 35th anniversary of the University Chorus at the University of Massachusetts – Boston in 2000, du Bois was commissioned to write Our Eyes for double a cappella choir; in honor of Kronos Quartet's 30th anniversary in 2003, du Bois was commissioned to write her first string quartet. Chosen from among the work of more than 300 composers from 32 countries as the inaugural recipient of the Kronos: Under 30 Project, du Bois wrote String Quartet: An eye for an eye makes the whole world blind for Kronos Quartet which she cites as a protest to the U.S . led invasion of Iraq. New York City's Kaufman Center commissioned du Bois' Cloud Watching in honor of their 50th anniversary in 2004; The Beaux Arts Trio commissioned her first piano trio (L'apothesose d'un reve) in honor of their 50th anniversary in 2004; Bargemusic commissioned Soleil sur Mer as part of their 30th anniversary celebration in 2007; during the 1000th anniversary of the founding of the city of Hanoi in 2010, du Bois' Within Earth, Wood Grows for chamber orchestra was premiered at the Hanoi Opera House by Southwest Chamber Music on March 19, 2010. Du Bois was Composer-in-Residence with Southwest Chamber Music in connection with their Ascending Dragon Music Festival.

In July 2011, Du Bois was commissioned by cellist Wendy Sutter (of Songs and Poems by Philip Glass) for a multi-movement cello work," the Savannah Music Festival for a second chamber work commission featuring violinist Daniel Hope, Present Music and PALS Children's Chorus for choral/instrument works, and the Anchorage Symphony and Cabrillo Festival Orchestra for orchestral works. Alexandra du Bois' compositions have been performed on five continents at venues including Carnegie Hall, New York; Concertgebouw, Amsterdam; Barbican Hall, London; Théâtre de la Ville, Paris; Kursaal Centre, San Sebastian; Smetana Hall, Prague; Teatro Gran Rex, Buenos Aires and Hanoi Opera House, Hanoi, Vietnam, De Oosterpoort, Groningen and Muziekcentrum Frits Philips, Eindhoven.

On March 12th, 2020, Du Bois's work "Heron. Rain. Blossom." had its world premiere at the Chamber Music Society at Lincoln Center in New York. The work was held at the start of the COVID-19 pandemic when many theaters were closing down and going dark. Subsequently, this was the last live performance, at Chamber Music Society at Lincoln Center, until the end of the pandemic lockdown and a long hiatus from live performances.

In 2025 the Vermont Symphony Orchestra performed her Fanfare for Orchestra as the opening work of its season finale at the Flynn in Burlington. The fanfare was inspired by Barack Obama's election and both celebrated the Civil Rights Movement and mourned its unfinished legacy.

=== Night Songs ===
Du Bois' third string quartet, Night Songs (Nachtliederen), also commissioned by Kronos Quartet, was composed from inspiration received from the letters and diaries of Holocaust victim Etty Hillesum. As explained by NewMusicBox.com, "The music born of this was starkly touching, conveying the complexity of individual human darkness rather than the epic turmoil of nations in a time of genocide." Du Bois stated of the nature and title of the same composition: “Night can represent the darkness of that time, of humanity, but it also represents the unconscious. Etty Hillesum was always uplifting—she was almost always singing a song. She had an incredible sense of inner light.” In 2004, du Bois received a grant from The Netherland-America Foundation and traveled throughout the Netherlands and Poland to retrace Hillesum's footsteps in preparation for writing the quartet. Kronos Quartet presented the New York premiere of du Bois' third string quartet alongside the world premiere of Henryk Gorecki's third string quartet ("...songs are sung") at Carnegie Hall on March 24, 2005.

== Compositions ==
Chamber

- (1999) Mirrors:trio for violin, cello and double bass
- (1999) Sonata for violin and piano ("The Storm")
- (2001) String Quintet: A Requiem for the Living for two violins, viola and two double basses'
- (2003) String Quartet: Oculus pro oculu totum orbem terrae caecat
  (An eye for an eye makes the whole world blind)
- (2003) Tempête de Sable (Storm of Sand) for clarinet, violin and viola
- (2003) String Quartet No. 2: Quartet of Images (quartet satz)
- (2003) Sonata for cello and piano
- (2004) Piano Trio: L'apothéose d'un rêve (Apotheosis of a Dream)
- (2005) String Quartet No. 3: Night Songs (Nachtliederen)
- (2006) Bruciare Distante (Burning Distant) for piano, violin, two cellos and double bass
- (2007) The Speaking Tide for piano, bass clarinet and cello
- (2007) Soleil sur Mer (Sun on Sea) for piano, clarinet and cello
- (2008) Dopo il duol, dopo il mal (After Sorrow, After Woe) for alto flute, harp and hand percussion
- (2009) Chanson d'orage (Thunderstorm of Song) for two violins
- (2010) Interstices of Aurorae for clarinet and cello
- (2013) Indlovu: Piano Quintet “The Elephant” for piano, violin, cello and double bass
- (2014) As Long As Thy Grief Lives for mezzo-soprano, duduk, piano and cello
- (2015) Interstices of Aurorae for clarinet and cello arr. for violin and cello
- (2015) Nonet for strings and winds: Hope Dies Last
- (2016) String Quartet No.4 "Obala More"
- (2017) Bells from the Abyss for violin and piano
- (2018) quintet: quiescence for bass clarinet, piano, and strings
- (2019) String Quartet No. 5 "Behind Rainbows"
- (2020) für pamuk for piano trio
- (2020) Heron. Rain. Blossom. for flute, clarinet, viola, and cello
- (2022) String Quartet No. 6 “Strolling in the Ultimate”
- (2022) WHO IS CALLING? for Kronos Quartet

Choral/Vocal

- (2000) Our Eyes (a cappella)
- (2001) Júdica Me (a cappella)
- (2008) In Beauty, May I Walk (a cappella)
- (2009) In Beauty, May I Walk for women's choir, children's choir, clarinet, string quartet and double bass

Orchestral / Large ensemble

- (2001) Four Songs for mezzo-soprano and orchestra
- (2004) Luminocity for mixed, amplified ensemble
- (2007) A Requiem for the Living for string orchestra
- (2009) Fanfare for Change (2-2-2-2; 4-3-2-1; timp.; strings)
- (2009) In Beauty, May I Walk for women's choir, clarinet, string quartet and double bass
- (2010) Within Earth, Wood Grows for large chamber orchestra and Vietnamese Dan Bau
- (2011) Prologue: The Quechol's Cry for children's choir, prepared piano and string quartet
- (2012) Beneath Boundaries for symphony orchestra (2-2-3-2; 4-3-4-1; timp.; strings)
- (2014) Noctilucent Song for string orchestra

Voice and piano

- (1999) El Regreso (The Return) (mezzo-soprano)
- (2000) Corazón Nuevo (New Heart) (tenor)

Solo

- (2001) Preludes to Solitude (guitar)
- (2004) Imaginary Pieces (piano)
- (2007) Prelude (organ)
- (2015) Solo Cello Suite: Out of Blue (cello)
- (2017) Fjord (solo piano)
- (2019) Oh Monarch, How Beautiful You Are (solo piano)
- (2020) Lakagígar (solo electric guitar)

Choreographed works

- (2006) Bruciare Distante (Burning Distant)(Collin Baja)
- (2007) The Speaking Tide (Spenser Theberge)

Arrangements

- (2006) I Wonder As I Wander
- (2006) Lamentu di Maria (Anonymous)
- (2007) Night Songs (Nachtliederen) Excerpts for Woodwind Quintet
- (2007) Bryant Medley
- (2016) Bugaršćica for string quartet and optional double bass with low-C extension

Film

- (2010) Patent Leather Scars by Yusef Miller; du Bois' The Speaking Tide licensed for soundtrack on complete version of film
- (2013) A Gathering of Shifts by Pierre St. Jacques
- (2014) Exploration of Dead Ends by Pierre St. Jacques
