= 1989–90 Alabama Crimson Tide men's basketball team =

American college basketball season

1989–90 Alabama Crimson Tide men's basketball

SEC tournament champions

NCAA tournament, Sweet Sixteen
- Conference: Southeastern Conference

Ranking
- Coaches: No. 19
- AP: No. 23
- Record: 26–9 (12–6 SEC)
- Head coach: Wimp Sanderson (10th season)
- Home arena: Coleman Coliseum

1989–90 Southeastern Conference men's basketball standings
| | Conf. | | | | Overall |
| Team | W | | L | PCT | W | | L | PCT |
|---|---|---|---|---|---|---|---|---|
| Georgia | 13 | – | 5 | .722 | 20 | – | 9 | .690 |
| No. 23 Alabama † | 12 | – | 6 | .667 | 26 | – | 9 | .743 |
| No. 19 LSU | 12 | – | 6 | .667 | 23 | – | 9 | .719 |
| Tennessee | 10 | – | 8 | .556 | 16 | – | 14 | .533 |
| Kentucky | 10 | – | 8 | .556 | 14 | – | 14 | .500 |
| Ole Miss | 8 | – | 10 | .444 | 13 | – | 17 | .433 |
| Auburn | 8 | – | 10 | .444 | 13 | – | 18 | .419 |
| Mississippi State | 7 | – | 11 | .389 | 16 | – | 14 | .533 |
| Vanderbilt | 7 | – | 11 | .389 | 21 | – | 14 | .600 |
| Florida | 3 | – | 15 | .167 | 7 | – | 21 | .250 |
† 1990 SEC tournament winner Rankings from AP poll

The 1989–90 Alabama Crimson Tide men's basketball team represented the University of Alabama in the 1989-90 NCAA Division I men's basketball season. The team's head coach was Wimp Sanderson, who was in his tenth season at Alabama. The team played their home games at Coleman Coliseum in Tuscaloosa, Alabama. They finished the season with a record of 26–9, 12–6 in conference, good for second behind Georgia.

The Tide lost Michael Ansley and Alvin Lee to graduation, but plenty of talent remained in Robert Horry, David Benoit, Keith Askins, and Melvin Cheatum.

The Tide won the 1990 SEC men's basketball tournament, their second straight SEC tournament title, beating Ole Miss in the final and earning another automatic bid to the NCAA tournament. The Tide advanced all the way to the Sweet 16, defeating Colorado State and Arizona before losing to Loyola Marymount.

== Roster ==
1989–90 Alabama Crimson Tide men's basketball team
Players
Coaches

| Pos. | # | Name | Height | Weight | Year | Previous school | Hometown |
|---|---|---|---|---|---|---|---|
| G | 44 | Melvin Cheatum | 6 ft 6 in (1.98 m) | — | Jr | Livingston High School | Livingston, Alabama |
| G | 12 | Gary Waites | 6 ft 2 in (1.88 m) | — | Jr | Decatur High School | Decatur, Georgia |
| F | 30 | David Benoit | 6 ft 8 in (2.03 m) | — | Sr | Lafayette High School | Lafayette, Louisiana |
| G | 22 | Bryant Lancaster | 6 ft 3 in (1.91 m) | — | So | Valley High School | Valley, Alabama |
| F | 41 | Keith Askins | 6 ft 6 in (1.98 m) | — | Jr | Athens High School | Athens, Alabama |
| F | 25 | Robert Horry | 6 ft 9 in (2.06 m) | — | So | Andalusia (AL) High School | Harford County, Maryland |
| G | 14 | James Sanders | 6 ft 2 in (1.88 m) | — | So |
| F | 54 | Marcus Webb | 6 ft 9 in (2.06 m) | — | So | Sidney Lanier High School | Montgomery, Alabama |
| C | 32 | Marcus Campbell | 6 ft 8 in (2.03 m) | — | So | Livingston High School | Livingston, Alabama |

Head coach

- Wimp Sanderson

Assistant coach(es)

Legend

- (C) Team captain
- (S) Suspended
- (I) Ineligible
- (W) Walk-on
- Injured
- Current redshirt

== Schedule and results ==
| Date time, TV | Rank^{#} | Opponent^{#} | Result | Record | Site city, state |
Regular Season
| November 24, 1989* | | Western Kentucky; San Juan Shootout | W 79–72 | 1–0 | Mario Morales Coliseum; Guaynabo, Puerto Rico |
| November 25, 1989* | | Eastern Michigan; San Juan Shootout | W 64–61 | 2–0 | Mario Morales Coliseum; Guaynabo, Puerto Rico |
| November 26, 1989* | | Clemson; San Juan Shootout | W 57–48 | 3–0 | Mario Morales Coliseum; Guaynabo, Puerto Rico |
| November 30, 1989* | | No. 12 North Carolina | W 101–93 | 4–0 | Coleman Coliseum; Tuscaloosa, Alabama |
| December 5, 1989* | No. 21 | at Virginia Tech | L 75–76 | 4–1 | Cassell Coliseum; Blacksburg, Virginia |
| December 9, 1989* | No. 21 | Eastern Kentucky | W 71–52 | 5–1 | |
| December 16, 1989* | No. 19 | Augusta | W 94–67 | 6–1 | Coleman Coliseum; Tuscaloosa, Alabama |
| December 18, 1989* | No. 19 | Charleston Southern | W 63–32 | 7–1 | Coleman Coliseum; Tuscaloosa, Alabama |
| December 21, 1989* | No. 20 | at Wake Forest | L 65–67 | 7–2 | Joel Coliseum; Winston-Salem, North Carolina |
| December 29, 1989* | No. 22 | Iona | W 78–39 | 8–2 | |
| December 30, 1989* | No. 22 | at Santa Clara | W 64–48 | 9–2 | Toso Pavilion; Santa Clara, California |
| January 3, 1990 | No. 22 | Vanderbilt | L 67–68 | 9–3 (0–1) | Coleman Coliseum; Tuscaloosa, Alabama |
| January 6, 1990 | No. 22 | at Ole Miss | W 66–48 | 10–3 (1–1) | Tad Smith Coliseum; Oxford, Mississippi |
| January 9, 1990 | No. 24 | Georgia | W 79–62 | 11–3 (2–1) | Coleman Coliseum; Tuscaloosa, Alabama |
| January 13, 1990 | No. 24 | at Mississippi State | W 62–57 | 12–3 (3–1) | Humphrey Coliseum; Starkville, Mississippi |
| January 17, 1990 | No. 25 | at Kentucky | L 65–82 | 12–4 (3–2) | Rupp Arena; Lexington, Kentucky |
| January 21, 1990 | No. 25 | No. 13 LSU | W 70–55 | 13–4 (4–2) | Coleman Coliseum; Tuscaloosa, Alabama |
| January 23, 1990 | No. 24 | at Tennessee | L 70–78 | 13–5 (4–3) | Thompson-Boling Arena; Knoxville, Tennessee |
| January 27, 1990 | No. 24 | Auburn | W 78–59 | 14–5 (5–3) | Coleman Coliseum; Tuscaloosa, Alabama |
| January 30, 1990 | | Florida | W 57–44 | 15–5 (6–3) | Coleman Coliseum; Tuscaloosa, Alabama |
| February 3, 1990 | | at Vanderbilt | W 65–56 | 16–5 (7–3) | Memorial Gymnasium; Nashville, Tennessee |
| February 7, 1990 | | Ole Miss | W 74–64 | 17–5 (8–3) | Coleman Coliseum; Tuscaloosa, Alabama |
| February 10, 1990 | | at Georgia | L 64–75 | 17–6 (8–4) | Stegeman Coliseum; Athens, Georgia |
| February 13, 1990 | | Mississippi State | L 74–86 | 17–7 (8–5) | Coleman Coliseum; Tuscaloosa, Alabama |
| February 17, 1990 | | Kentucky | W 83–58 | 18–7 (9–5) | Coleman Coliseum; Tuscaloosa, Alabama |
| February 21, 1990 | | at No. 12 LSU | L 69–75 | 18–8 (9–6) | Maravich Assembly Center; Baton Rouge, Louisiana |
| February 24, 1990 | | Tennessee | W 87–73 | 19–8 (10–6) | Coleman Coliseum; Tuscaloosa, Alabama |
| February 28, 1990 | | at Auburn | W 80–65 | 20–8 (11–6) | Memorial Coliseum; Auburn, Alabama |
| March 3, 1990 | | at Florida | W 63–54 | 21–8 (12–6) | O'Connell Center; Gainesville, Florida |
SEC Tournament
| March 9, 1990 | | Mississippi State; Second Round | W 59–44 | 22–8 | Amway Arena; Orlando, Florida |
| March 10, 1990 | | Auburn; Semifinals | W 87–71 | 23–8 | Amway Arena; Orlando, Florida |
| March 11, 1990 | | Ole Miss; SEC Championship | W 70–51 | 24–8 | Amway Arena; Orlando, Florida |
NCAA Tournament
| March 16, 1990* | (7 W) No. 23 | (10 W) Colorado State; First Round | W 71–54 | 25–8 | Long Beach Arena; Long Beach, California |
| March 18, 1990* | (7 W) No. 23 | (2 W) No. 14 Arizona; Second Round | W 77–55 | 26–8 | Long Beach Arena; Long Beach, California |
| March 23, 1990* | (7 W) No. 23 | (11 W) Loyola Marymount; Sweet Sixteen | L 60–62 | 26–9 | Oakland Coliseum Arena; Oakland, California |
*Non-conference game. ^{#}Rankings from AP poll. (#) Tournament seedings in parentheses. SE=Southeast.
