= Chía Patiño =

Ecuadorian composer and arts administrator

Lucia Patiño, known as Chía (born 1967), is an Ecuadorian composer and arts administrator.

Born in Quito, Patiño studied at a number of institutions in Ecuador before attending the University of Louisville, where she took classes in composition and piano. At the Jacobs School of Music at Indiana University Bloomington she received a Master of Music and a Doctor of Music (2008); at the Cincinnati Conservatory of Music she received another master's degree, this in the arts with a specialty in performing arts. She spent nine years working at various theaters in the United States, including the Kennedy Center, the Metropolitan Opera, the Lyric Opera of Chicago, and the Opera Theatre of St. Louis. She also directed a number of opera productions, including Don Giovanni for the Michigan Opera Theater and Cruzar la Cara de la Luna for Houston Grand Opera. Returning to Ecuador, she took the helm of the Teatro Nacional Sucre, where she has continued to direct productions. She has also worked to bring artists such as Philip Glass to Ecuador to perform. She has received a number of awards for her work. As a composer, Patiño counts among her influences Béla Bartók, Toru Takemitsu, John Corigliano, and Mario Lavista. Among her works are two operas and music for ballet. With Carmen Helena Téllez, she has developed a version of The Magic Flute, La flauta mágica de los Andes, featuring aspects of Andean mythology and using Ecuadorian instruments.
