= NOTUS, the Contemporary Vocal Ensemble =

Choir in Indiana, United States

NOTUS
- Choir
- Former name: Contemporary Vocal Ensemble
- Origin: Bloomington, Indiana
- Founded: 1980 (46 years ago)
- Founder: Alan Harler
- Genre: 20th-century classical music; 21st-century classical music
- Music director: Dominick DiOrio
- Choir admission: By audition
- Affiliation: Indiana University
- Website: blogs.iu.edu/jsomchoral/notus/

NOTUS, formerly the Contemporary Vocal Ensemble, at the Indiana University Jacobs School of Music, is the only university-based vocal group in the United States exclusively dedicated to the study and performance of vocal and choral repertoire written after 1900. It includes singers, composers, young scholars and instrumentalists chosen for their special interest in the music of our time. Depending on the repertoire, the ensemble adjusts its size to perform solo vocal, chamber choral and large oratorio-like compositions.

Noted for innovative programming, NOTUS explores all significant styles of the last century as well as works at the forefront of today's contemporary music scene. A special emphasis is placed on the works of living and emerging composers, especially notable works for voices composed by Indiana University faculty and students.

The choir was renamed NOTUS after the Greek god of the south wind in 2013. Dominick DiOrio serves as current director of the ensemble, only the fourth person to hold this position.

== Performances ==
NOTUS offers an annual series of concerts at Indiana University and performs occasionally in outside concerts and festivals. Recent projects include the commission, performance and recording of James MacMillan's Sun-Dogs (2006), for chorus a cappella; the Missa ad Consolationis Dominam Nostram (1994) by the Mexican composer Mario Lavista, and the premiere and recording of Juan Orrego-Salas's choral-orchestral cantata La ciudad celeste (2004). Other notable projects are the American, Midwest and/or university premieres of John Adams's oratorio El Niño (2001); Ralph Shapey's oratorio Praise; Karlheinz Stockhausen's choral opera Atmen gibt das Leben (1994), Steve Reich's Tehillim and Desert Music; Music/Theater Piece by Philip Glass; Arvo Pärt's Passio and Miserere, Gilles Swayne's Cry; James MacMillan's Seven Last Words from the Cross; and several world-premieres by Feliù Gasull, Aurelio de la Vega, and Jorge Liderman. The Contemporary Vocal Ensemble produced and performed the first university-based performance of Osvaldo Golijov's opera Ainadamar and the world-premiere of Gabriela Ortiz's video-opera ¡Unicamente la verdad! (Only the Truth!).

Since Dominick DiOrio arrived in 2012, NOTUS has performed an eclectic combination of works for voices by composers such as Dominick Argento, John Cage, David Lang, Chen Yi, Melissa Dunphy, Ēriks Ešenvalds, Don Freund, Ted Hearne, Moses Hogan, Paul Mealor, Per Nørgård, Tawnie Olson, Sven-David Sandström, Caroline Shaw, Veljo Tormis, Dale Trumbore, Robert Vuichard, and Zachary Wadsworth.

== Directors ==
Name	Years
Alan Harler	1980–1981
Jan Harrington	1981–1992
Carmen Helena Téllez	1992–2012
Dominick DiOrio	2012–present

== Recordings ==
In September 2018, NOTUS released their first commercial album with Innova Recordings, NOTUS: Of Radiance and Refraction, which includes five world premiere recordings by Indiana University faculty composers.

In December 2022, NOTUS released their second commercial album with Navona Records, What Is Ours: Music for an America in Progress, which includes music by Carlos Cordero, Reena Esmail, Andrea Ramsey, Moira Smiley, Joel Thompson, Leigha Amick, John William Griffith II, and NOTUS director Dominick DiOrio.

== Awards ==
In 2019, NOTUS was named the first-prize winner of The American Prize in Choral Performance in the college/university division under DiOrio's direction.
