= 1990 SEC men's basketball tournament =

Annual college basketball tournament

- Classification: Division I
- Season: 1989–90
- Teams: 9
- Site: Orlando Arena; Orlando, Florida
- Champions: Alabama (5th title)
- Winning coach: Wimp Sanderson (3rd title)
- MVP: Melvin Cheatum (Alabama)
- Attendance: 75,982
- Television: Jefferson Pilot Sports; ABC (Championship game)

1989–90 Southeastern Conference men's basketball standings
	Conf.				Overall
Team	W		L	PCT	W		L	PCT
Georgia	13	–	5	.722	20	–	9	.690
No. 23 Alabama †	12	–	6	.667	26	–	9	.743
No. 19 LSU	12	–	6	.667	23	–	9	.719
Tennessee	10	–	8	.556	16	–	14	.533
Kentucky	10	–	8	.556	14	–	14	.500
Ole Miss	8	–	10	.444	13	–	17	.433
Auburn	8	–	10	.444	13	–	18	.419
Mississippi State	7	–	11	.389	16	–	14	.533
Vanderbilt	7	–	11	.389	21	–	14	.600
Florida	3	–	15	.167	7	–	21	.250
† 1990 SEC tournament winner Rankings from AP poll

The 1990 SEC Men’s Basketball Tournament was held March 8–11, 1990 at the Orlando Arena in Orlando, Florida. The Alabama Crimson Tide won the tournament and received the SEC’s automatic bid to the 1990 NCAA Men’s Division I Basketball Tournament by defeating the Ole Miss Rebels by a score of 70–51.

Television coverage of the first round, the quarterfinals, and semifinals were regionally syndicated by Jefferson Pilot Sports, and the championship game was nationally televised on ABC.

Note: The Kentucky Wildcats men's basketball team was not qualified to participate in either the SEC or NCAA tournaments of 1990 and 1991 due to NCAA probation.

== Bracket ==
First round
8	Vanderbilt	68
9	Florida	58

Second round
1	#25 Georgia	74 (OT)
8	Vanderbilt	78
4	Tennessee	86
5	Ole Miss	87
2	Alabama	59
7	Mississippi State	44
3	#16 LSU	76
6	Auburn	78

Semifinals
8	Vanderbilt	62
5	Ole Miss	65
2	Alabama	87
6	Auburn	81

Championship game
5	Ole Miss	51
2	Alabama	70
