= 1989–90 LSU Tigers basketball team =

Louisiana State University during the 1989–90 NCAA men's college basketball season

1989–90 LSU Tigers basketball

NCAA tournament, second round
- Conference: Southeast Conference
- West Division

Ranking
- AP: No. 19
- Record: 23–9 (12–6 SEC)
- Head coach: Dale Brown (18th season)
- Assistant coach: Johnny Jones (6th season)
- Home arena: Pete Maravich Assembly Center

1989–90 Southeastern Conference men's basketball standings
	Conf.				Overall
Team	W		L	PCT	W		L	PCT
Georgia	13	–	5	.722	20	–	9	.690
No. 23 Alabama †	12	–	6	.667	26	–	9	.743
No. 19 LSU	12	–	6	.667	23	–	9	.719
Tennessee	10	–	8	.556	16	–	14	.533
Kentucky	10	–	8	.556	14	–	14	.500
Ole Miss	8	–	10	.444	13	–	17	.433
Auburn	8	–	10	.444	13	–	18	.419
Mississippi State	7	–	11	.389	16	–	14	.533
Vanderbilt	7	–	11	.389	21	–	14	.600
Florida	3	–	15	.167	7	–	21	.250
† 1990 SEC tournament winner Rankings from AP poll

The 1989-90 LSU Tigers men's basketball team represented Louisiana State University during the 1989–90 NCAA men's college basketball season. The head coach was Dale Brown. The team was a member of the Southeastern Conference and played their home games at Pete Maravich Assembly Center.

== Roster ==
1989–90 LSU Tigers men's basketball team
Players
Coaches

Pos.	#	Name	Height	Weight	Year	Previous school	Hometown
G	10	Maurice "Mo" Williamson	6 ft 0 in (1.83 m)	172 lb (78 kg)	So	Wilbur Cross	New Haven, CT
G	13	Dennis Tracey	6 ft 0 in (1.83 m)	177 lb (80 kg)	Jr	De La Salle	New Orleans, LA
F	21	Lenear Burns	6 ft 7 in (2.01 m)	215 lb (98 kg)	Fr	Varnado HS	Angie, LA
F	24	Vernel Singleton	6 ft 7 in (2.01 m)	210 lb (95 kg)	So	S Natchez HS	Natchez, MS
F	32	Harold Boudreaux	6 ft 9 in (2.06 m)	238 lb (108 kg)	So	Cecilia HS	Arnaudville, LA
C	33	Shaquille O'Neal	7 ft 1 in (2.16 m)	290 lb (132 kg)	Fr	Robert G. Cole	Newark, NJ
G	34	Randy Devall	6 ft 4 in (1.93 m)	192 lb (87 kg)	Jr	Lee HS	Baton Rouge, LA
G	35	Chris Jackson	6 ft 1 in (1.85 m)	160 lb (73 kg)	So	Gulfport	Gulfport, MS
G	41	Richard Krajewski	6 ft 9 in (2.06 m)	215 lb (98 kg)	Jr	Grafton HS	Grafton, ND
C	43	Geert Hammink	7 ft 0 in (2.13 m)	260 lb (118 kg)	Fr		Didam, Netherlands
F	44	Wayne Sims	6 ft 7 in (2.01 m)	247 lb (112 kg)	Jr	DeRidder HS	DeRidder, LA
C	53	Stanley Roberts	7 ft 0 in (2.13 m)	285 lb (129 kg)	So	Lower Richland	Hopkins, SC

Head coach

- Dale Brown (Minot State)

Assistant coach(es)

Legend

- (C) Team captain
- (S) Suspended
- (I) Ineligible
- (W) Walk-on
- Injured
- Current redshirt

== Schedule and results ==
Date time, TV	Rank^{#}	Opponent^{#}	Result	Record	Site city, state
Non-conference regular season
Nov 15, 1989*	No. 2	Southern Miss; Preseason NIT	W 91–80	1–0	Maravich Assembly Center; Baton Rouge, LA
Nov 16, 1989*	No. 2	Kansas; Preseason NIT	L 83–89	1–1	Maravich Assembly Center; Baton Rouge, LA
Dec 2, 1989*	No. 9	McNeese State	W 85–49	2–1	Maravich Assembly Center; Baton Rouge, LA
Dec 4, 1989*	No. 9	Lamar	W 116–76	3–1	Maravich Assembly Center; Baton Rouge, LA
Dec 8, 1989*	No. 8	Cal State Los Angeles	W 82–57	4–1	Maravich Assembly Center; Baton Rouge, LA
Dec 20, 1989*	No. 8	Northwestern State	W 73–63	5–1	Maravich Assembly Center; Baton Rouge, LA
Dec 30, 1989*	No. 9	Hardin-Simmons	W 100–66	6–1	Maravich Assembly Center; Baton Rouge, LA
Jan 2, 1990*	No. 11	vs. Texas	W 124–113	7–1	The Summit; Houston, TX
SEC regular season
Jan 4, 1990	No. 11	at Mississippi State	L 80–87 ^{OT}	7–2 (0–1)	Humphrey Coliseum; Starkville, MS
Jan 6, 1990	No. 11	at Auburn	W 77–70	8–2 (1–1)	Beard–Eaves–Memorial Coliseum; Auburn, AL
Jan 8, 1990; JP	No. 14	Tennessee	W 111–94	9–2 (2–1)	Maravich Assembly Center; Baton Rouge, LA
Jan 13, 1990	No. 14	Kentucky	W 94–81	10–2 (3–1)	Maravich Assembly Center; Baton Rouge, LA
Jan 16, 1990	No. 13	Vanderbilt	W 101–72	11–2 (4–1)	Maravich Assembly Center; Baton Rouge, LA
Jan 20, 1990*	No. 13	vs. Notre Dame	W 87–64	12–2	Louisiana Superdome; New Orleans, LA
Jan 21, 1990	No. 13	at No. 25 Alabama	L 55–70	12–3 (4–2)	Coleman Coliseum; Tuscaloosa, AL
Jan 24, 1990	No. 16	Georgia	L 92–94	12–4 (4–3)	Maravich Assembly Center; Baton Rouge, LA
Jan 27, 1990	No. 16	Florida	W 70–52	13–4 (5–3)	Maravich Assembly Center; Baton Rouge, LA
Jan 28, 1990*	No. 16	No. 5 UNLV	W 107–105	14–4	Maravich Assembly Center; East Rutherford, NJ
Jan 31, 1990	No. 14	at Ole Miss	W 79–77	15–4 (6–3)	C.M. "Tad" Smith Coliseum; Oxford, MS
Feb 3, 1990*; CBS	No. 14	No. 20 Loyola Marymount	W 148–141 ^{OT}	16–4	Maravich Assembly Center (14,084); Baton Rouge, LA
Feb 5, 1990	No. 11	Mississippi State	W 86–68	17–4 (7–3)	Maravich Assembly Center; Baton Rouge, LA
Feb 7, 1990	No. 11	Auburn	W 82–71	18–4 (8–3)	Maravich Assembly Center; Baton Rouge, LA
Feb 10, 1990	No. 11	at Tennessee	W 119–113	19–4 (9–3)	Thompson-Boling Arena; Knoxville, TN
Feb 15, 1990	No. 9	at Kentucky	L 95–100	19–5 (9–4)	Rupp Arena; Lexington, KY
Feb 18, 1990	No. 9	at Vanderbilt	W 121–108	20–5 (10–4)	Memorial Gymnasium; Nashville, TN
Feb 21, 1990	No. 12	Alabama	W 75–69	21–5 (11–4)	Maravich Assembly Center; Baton Rouge, LA
Feb 25, 1990	No. 12	at Georgia	L 85–86	21–6 (11–5)	Stegeman Coliseum; Athens, GA
Feb 27, 1990	No. 15	at Florida	L 63–76	21–7 (11–6)	Stephen C. O'Connell Center; Gainesville, FL
Mar 3, 1990	No. 15	Ole Miss	W 103–94	22–7 (12–6)	Maravich Assembly Center; Baton Rouge, LA
SEC Tournament
Mar 9, 1990; JP	No. 16	vs. Auburn; SEC Tournament Quarterfinal	L 76–78	22–8	Orlando Arena; Orlando, FL
NCAA Tournament
March 15*; CBS	(5 SE) No. 19	vs. (12 SE) Villanova; NCAA Tournament First Round	W 70–63	23–8	Thompson–Boling Arena; Knoxville, TN
March 17*; CBS	(5 SE) No. 19	vs. (4 SE) No. 9 Georgia Tech; NCAA Tournament Second Round	L 91–94	23–9	Thompson–Boling Arena; Knoxville, TN
*Non-conference game. ^{#}Rankings from AP Poll. (#) Tournament seedings in parentheses. SE=Southeast.

== Awards and honors ==
- Chris Jackson – SEC Player of the Year (2x), Consensus First-team All-American (2x)

== 1990 NBA draft ==
Round	Pick	Player	NBA club
1	3	Chris Jackson	Denver Nuggets
