= 1989–90 Georgia Bulldogs basketball team =

American college basketball season

1989–90 Georgia Bulldogs basketball

SEC Regular season champions

NCAA tournament
- Conference: Southeastern Conference
- Record: 20–9 (13–5 SEC)
- Head coach: Hugh Durham (12th season)
- Assistant coaches: Don Beasley; Larry Gay; Joe Cunningham
- Home arena: Stegeman Coliseum

1989–90 Southeastern Conference men's basketball standings
	Conf.				Overall
Team	W		L	PCT	W		L	PCT
Georgia	13	–	5	.722	20	–	9	.690
No. 23 Alabama †	12	–	6	.667	26	–	9	.743
No. 19 LSU	12	–	6	.667	23	–	9	.719
Tennessee	10	–	8	.556	16	–	14	.533
Kentucky	10	–	8	.556	14	–	14	.500
Ole Miss	8	–	10	.444	13	–	17	.433
Auburn	8	–	10	.444	13	–	18	.419
Mississippi State	7	–	11	.389	16	–	14	.533
Vanderbilt	7	–	11	.389	21	–	14	.600
Florida	3	–	15	.167	7	–	21	.250
† 1990 SEC tournament winner Rankings from AP poll

The 1989–90 Georgia Bulldogs basketball team represented the University of Georgia as a member of the Southeastern Conference during the 1989–90 NCAA men's basketball season. The team was led by head coach Hugh Durham, and played their home games at Stegeman Coliseum in Athens, Georgia. The Bulldogs won the SEC Regular season title, and received an at-large bid to the NCAA tournament as No. 7 seed in the Midwest region. They were defeated by No. 10 seed Texas in the opening round to finish the season at 20–9 (13–5 SEC).

== Roster ==
1989–90 Georgia Bulldogs men's basketball team
Players
Coaches

Pos.	#	Name	Height	Weight	Year	Hometown
PG	11	Litterial Green	6 ft 1 in (1.85 m)	175 lb (79 kg)	So	Moss Point, Mississippi
C	33	Alec Kessler	6 ft 11 in (2.11 m)	225 lb (102 kg)	Sr	Roswell, Georgia

Head coach

- Hugh Durham (Florida State)

Assistant coach(es)

- Don Beasley (Northwestern State)
- Larry Gay (Florida State)
- Joe Cunningham

Legend

- (C) Team captain
- (S) Suspended
- (I) Ineligible
- (W) Walk-on
- Injured
- Current redshirt

== Schedule and results ==
Date time, TV	Rank^{#}	Opponent^{#}	Result	Record	Site city, state
Non-conference Regular season
Nov 27, 1989*		Charleston Southern	W 91–55	1–0	Stegeman Coliseum; Athens, Georgia
Dec 1, 1989*		vs. TCU; WKU Invitational	W 77–72	2–0	E.A. Diddle Arena; Bowling Green, Kentucky
Dec 2, 1989*		at Western Kentucky; WKU Invitational	W 76–70	3–0	E.A. Diddle Arena; Bowling Green, Kentucky
Dec 9, 1989*		at Central Florida	W 92–62	4–0	Orlando Arena; Orlando, Florida
Dec 11, 1989*		Mercer	W 85–57	5–0	Stegeman Coliseum; Athens, Georgia
Dec 16, 1989*		at No. 15 Georgia Tech; Rivalry	L 89–92	5–1	Alexander Memorial Coliseum; Atlanta, Georgia
Dec 20, 1989*		Jacksonville	W 91–62	6–1	Stegeman Coliseum; Athens, Georgia
Dec 28, 1989*		vs. Wisconsin; Tribune Classic	W 65–64	7–1	Wells Fargo Arena; Tempe, Arizona
Dec 29, 1989*		at Arizona State; Tribune Classic	L 61–62	7–2	Wells Fargo Arena; Tempe, Arizona
SEC Regular season
Jan 3, 1990		Kentucky	W 106–91	8–2 (1–0)	Stegeman Coliseum; Athens, Georgia
Jan 6, 1990		at Florida	L 69–97	8–3 (1–1)	Stephen C. O'Connell Center; Gainesville, Florida
Jan 9, 1990		at No. 24 Alabama	L 62–79	8–4 (1–2)	Coleman Coliseum; Tuscaloosa, Alabama
Jan 13, 1990		Vanderbilt	W 108–81	9–4 (2–2)	Stegeman Coliseum; Athens, Georgia
Jan 17, 1990		Mississippi State	W 83–69	10–4 (3–2)	Stegeman Coliseum; Athens, Georgia
Jan 20, 1990		at Ole Miss	L 74–84	10–5 (3–3)	Tad Smith Coliseum; Oxford, Mississippi
Jan 24, 1990		at No. 16 Louisiana State	W 94–92	11–5 (4–3)	Maravich Assembly Center; Baton Rouge, Louisiana
Jan 27, 1990		Tennessee	W 85–77	12–5 (5–3)	Stegeman Coliseum; Athens, Georgia
Jan 31, 1990		Auburn	W 88–75	13–5 (6–3)	Stegeman Coliseum; Athens, Georgia
Feb 3, 1990		at Kentucky	L 77–88	13–6 (6–4)	Rupp Arena; Lexington, Kentucky
Feb 6, 1990		Florida	W 70–65	14–6 (7–4)	Stegeman Coliseum; Athens, Georgia
Feb 10, 1990		Alabama	W 75–64	15–6 (8–4)	Stegeman Coliseum; Athens, Georgia
Feb 14, 1990		at Vanderbilt	W 67–66	16–6 (9–4)	Memorial Gymnasium; Nashville, Tennessee
Feb 17, 1990		at Mississippi State	W 82–74	17–6 (10–4)	Humphrey Coliseum; Starkville, Mississippi
Feb 21, 1990		Ole Miss	W 107–83	18–6 (11–4)	Stegeman Coliseum; Athens, Georgia
Feb 25, 1990		No. 12 Louisiana State	W 86–85	19–6 (12–4)	Stegeman Coliseum; Athens, Georgia
Feb 28, 1990		at Tennessee	L 83–93	19–7 (12–5)	Thompson-Boling Arena; Knoxville, Tennessee
Mar 3, 1990		at Auburn	W 94–79	20–7 (13–5)	Beard-Eaves-Memorial Coliseum; Auburn, Alabama
SEC Tournament
Mar 9, 1990*	No. 25	vs. Vanderbilt; SEC Tournament Quarterfinal	L 74–78 ^{OT}	20–8	Orlando Arena; Orlando, Florida
NCAA Tournament
Mar 16, 1990*	(7 MW)	vs. (10 MW) Texas; First Round	L 88–100	20–9	RCA Dome; Indianapolis, Indiana
*Non-conference game. ^{#}Rankings from AP Poll. (#) Tournament seedings in parentheses. MW=Midwest. All times are in Eastern Time.

== Awards and honors ==
- Alec Kessler – All-American, SEC Athlete of the Year

== NBA draft ==
Round	Pick	Player	NBA club
1	12	Alec Kessler	Houston Rockets
