= John Howell Morrison =

American composer

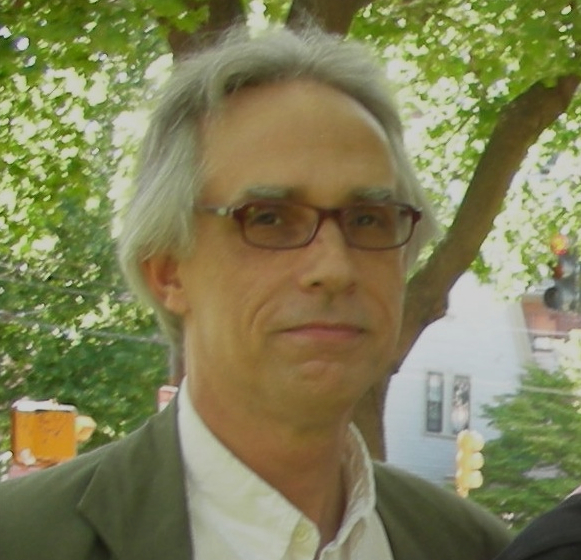
- Website: http://www.johnmorrison.org/

John Howell Morrison is a composer and professor at the Longy School of Music in Cambridge, Massachusetts. While studying for his doctorate at the University of Michigan, he was a recipient of the Regents Fellowship.
