= Longy School of Music of Bard College =

Music school in Cambridge, Massachusetts

Coordinates: 42.37846°N 71.12335°W

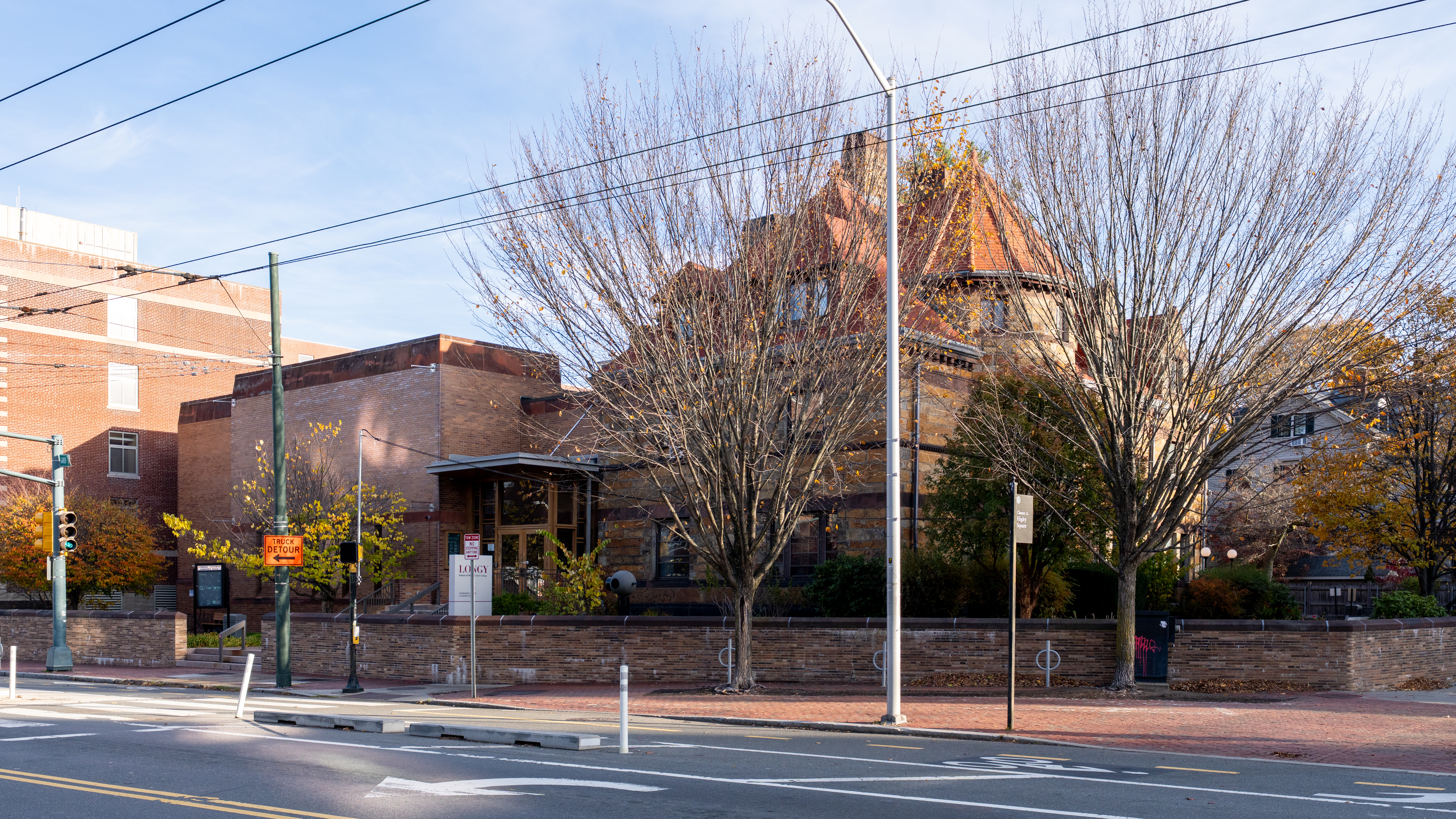
Longy School of Music of Bard College's main conservatory campus in Cambridge, Massachusetts

Longy School of Music of Bard College is a private music school in Cambridge, Massachusetts, associated with Bard College. Founded in 1915 as the Longy School of Music, it was one of the four independent degree-granting music schools in the Boston region along with the New England Conservatory, Berklee College of Music, and Boston Conservatory. In 2012, the institution merged with Bard College to become Longy School of Music of Bard College. As of fall 2023, the conservatory has 318 students in its degree programs.

== History ==
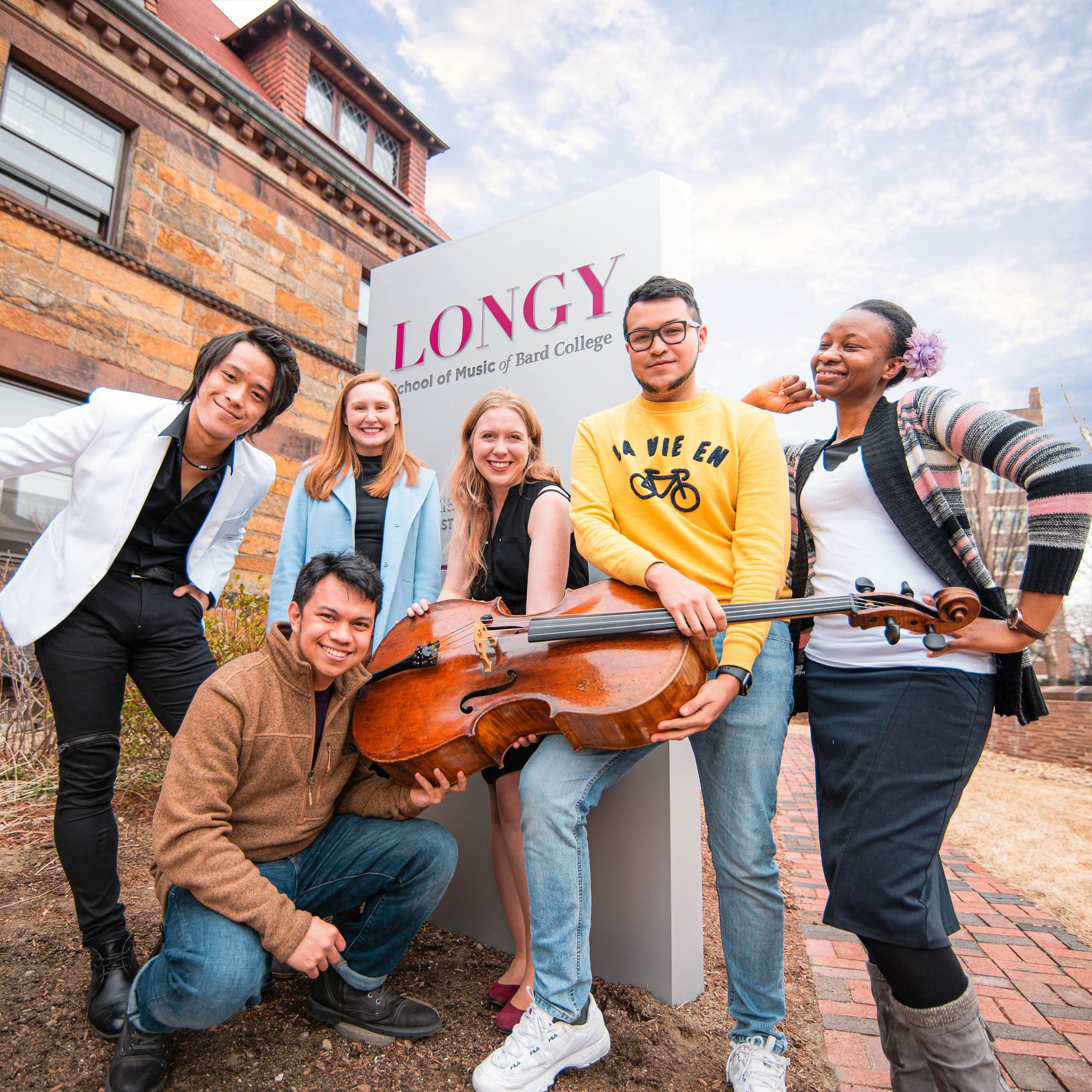
Longy's Garden Street Entrance and sign, with conservatory students.

Longy School of Music was founded in Boston in 1915 by Georges Longy, a French-born oboist and graduate of the Paris Conservatory who had joined the Boston Symphony Orchestra in 1898. Upon his retirement in 1925, his daughter, Renée Longy-Miquelle, succeeded him as director. She recruited several of Georges Longy's Boston Symphony colleagues as faculty members, and established Dalcroze eurhythmics as an important part of Longy's curriculum.

The school moved across the Charles River to Cambridge in 1930, and in 1937 took up residence in the stone mansion at One Follen Street; originally built in 1889 by railroad baron Edwin Hale Abbot. During that time, Longy had a close relationship with Harvard and Radcliffe colleges. Many of Harvard’s most talented music students, including Elliott Carter and Daniel Pinkham, crossed the Cambridge Common to study with Longy’s performance faculty. Between 1938 and 1944, the pedagogue and theoretician Nadia Boulanger taught advanced courses in harmony, composition and counterpoint at Longy and established a tradition of focus on music theory and composition that continues to characterize the school to the present day. The school's Preparatory and Continuing Studies program (part-time private lessons, classes, and ensembles offered to area residents) evolved from its beginnings in the 1920s when it began offering classes for children. In 1978, a Saturday program of theory, private lessons, and other music classes for children was added.

Previous leaders of the school include violinist Roman Totenberg, director from 1978 to 1985, pianist Victor Rosenbaum, director from 1985 to 2001, and Kwang-Wu Kim, president from 2001 to 2006. Rosenbaum's tenure as director saw the establishment of the opera and modern American music departments as well as a growth in student numbers from 600 to 1,200, and in the annual budget from $600,000 to $3.5 million. The current president is Karen Zorn, who took up her post in 2007.

On April 1, 2010, the Boston Globe reported that Longy was in negotiations to become a graduate school of Bard College. President Zorn began preliminary talks with Bard's president, Leon Botstein in July 2009.

The merger with Bard College in June 2011 established a Master of Arts in Teaching in Music degree program, located in Los Angeles, California. The program is based on the tenets of the Venezuelan movement of social empowerment through music education known as El Sistema. The Los Angeles Philharmonic is also a partner in the MAT program, with hands-on teacher training taking place at the LA Phil's premier El Sistema-inspired site, Heart of Los Angeles (YOLA). The Master of Arts in Teaching in Music was created in association with Take a Stand , a partnership between Longy, Bard, and the LA Phil that was formed to promote and support the El Sistema-inspired music education movement throughout the US.

== Facilities ==
=== Zabriskie House ===
Longy's original home in Cambridge is the Edwin Abbot House, a well-appointed landmark building originally designed by Longfellow, Alden, and Harlow. As is the case with the firm's designs for Cambridge City Hall, the house's extensive Richardsonian detailing, and winding open stair, recall two of the partners' previous work in the office of legendary Boston architect, H. H. Richardson. The building is on the National Register of Historic Places. The structure now holds rooms for teaching, administration, performance and practice. Following the construction of Pickman Hall in 1970 (see below), Longy began a program in the 1990s to add facilities and renovate existing ones. The program included construction of the Bakalar Music Library, which opened in 1992; acquisition and restoration of the Rey-Waldstein Building; and renovation and expansion of the Edward M. Pickman Concert Hall.

=== The Rey-Waldstein Building ===
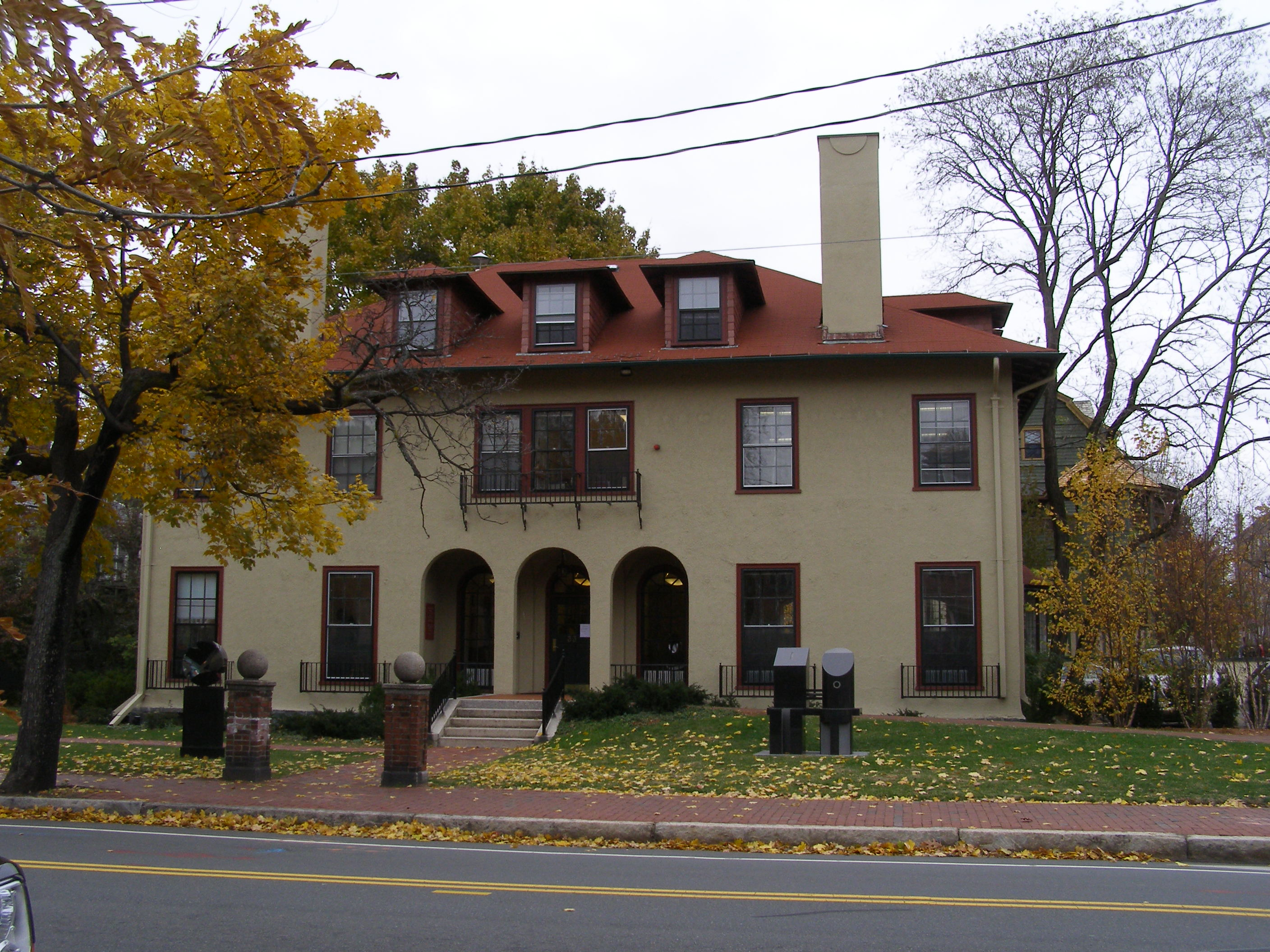
The Rey-Waldstein Building

In 1998, Longy purchased an additional building at 33 Garden Street to add further performance and practice space as well as classrooms and offices. Originally built in 1905, and renovated by Longy in 2005, the historic structure is now named in honor of Margaret Rey and H.A. Rey, the creators of Curious George, along with longtime supporters of Longy, and Margaret Rey’s parents, Felix and Gertrude Waldstein. In 2006, the Cambridge Historical Commission recognized Longy with a Preservation Award for the quality of its restoration and renovation, designed by Wolf Architects of Boston. In addition to providing universal access into the building, Longy restored the original polychromatic exterior, improved the public spaces, and, among other renovations, provided attractive new lounge space and practice rooms in the basement.

=== Edward M. Pickman Concert Hall ===
Pickman Hall

The Edward M. Pickman Concert Hall, built in 1970, is Longy School of Music of Bard College's primary performance space. Named in honor of Edward M. Pickman, president of the board of trustees from 1955 to 1959, the 300-seat birch-lined hall provides a setting for masterclasses, and solo and chamber performances. The addition to the historic Abbot House was designed by Huygens and Tappe. Its juxtaposition of abstract contemporary volumes of brick and stone, with the historic masonry forms of the Abbot House, has been admired over the decades as a model combination of old and new. The completion of a renovation in 1993 was marked with a concert that included the world premiere of Howard Frazin's Amid a Crowd of Stars. In 2010, Longy undertook another round of renovations to fine-tune the Hall's acoustics, expand the lobby, and create a new entrance pavilion. Over 250 concerts now take place in Pickman Hall each year, many of which are free and open to the public.

== Academics ==
Through its conservatory, Longy School of Music of Bard College offers two four-year undergraduate programs: Undergraduate Diploma, and Bachelor of Music Degree (the latter in conjunction with Emerson College). At graduate level, the school offers two two-year programs: Master of Music Degree, and Graduate Performance Diploma.

Longy launched a fully online Master of Music in Music Education degree program (MM/ME) designed especially for educators who seek an advanced degree without taking time off from their careers.

== Notable alumni ==
Notable former students and alumni of Longy School of Music of Bard College include:

- Elliott Carter (composer)
- Schuyler Chapin (former General Manager New York Metropolitan Opera, Dean of Columbia University School of the Arts)
- Alexandra du Bois (composer)
- Ralph Farris (violist, violinist, composer, and conductor)
- Robert Freeman (pianist, musicologist, and long time director of the Eastman School of Music)
- Ashley Hall-Tighe (trumpet)
- Anton Kuerti (pianist, music teacher and composer)
- Noël Lee (pianist)
- Janice Lourie (computer scientist and graphic artist)
- Susana Naidich (singer, musicologist, phonologist, voice teacher, and speech-language pathologist)
- Dmitri Nabokov (opera singer and translator)
- Jean Papineau-Couture (composer)
- Daniel Pinkham (composer, organist, and harpsichordist)
- Greg Sandow (music critic, composer)
- Polyna Savridi (soprano)

== Notable faculty ==
Notable faculty at Longy include:

- Kenneth Amis (tuba player)
- Anne Azéma (voice, early music)
- Laura Anne Bossert (violinist and violist)
- Phoebe Carrai (baroque cellist)
- Jonathan Cohler (clarinetist)
- Pamela Dellal (voice and diction)
- Isaiah Jackson (conductor)
- John Howell Morrison (composer)
- Noah Preminger (Jazz saxophonist)
- Kenneth Radnofsky (classical saxophonist)
- Jayne West (soprano)

Past faculty have included:

- Olga Averino (soprano and vocal pedagogue)
- Charlie Banacos (jazz and improvisation)
- E. Power Biggs (organist)
- Nadia Boulanger (composer, conductor, and music theorist)
- Sarah Caldwell (conductor and opera company director)
- John Ernest Cook (composer and organist)
- Edward Downes (musicologist and critic)
- Thomas Meglioranza (baritone)
- Walter Piston (composer and music theorist)
- Eric Rosenblith (violinist)
- Peter Serkin (pianist)
- Roman Totenberg (violinist)
- Pacifica Quartet (Visiting Artists in Chamber Music)
- Nicholas Van Slyck (composer)
- Robert Hugh Willoughby (flutist)
