= Dominick DiOrio =

American composer and conductor

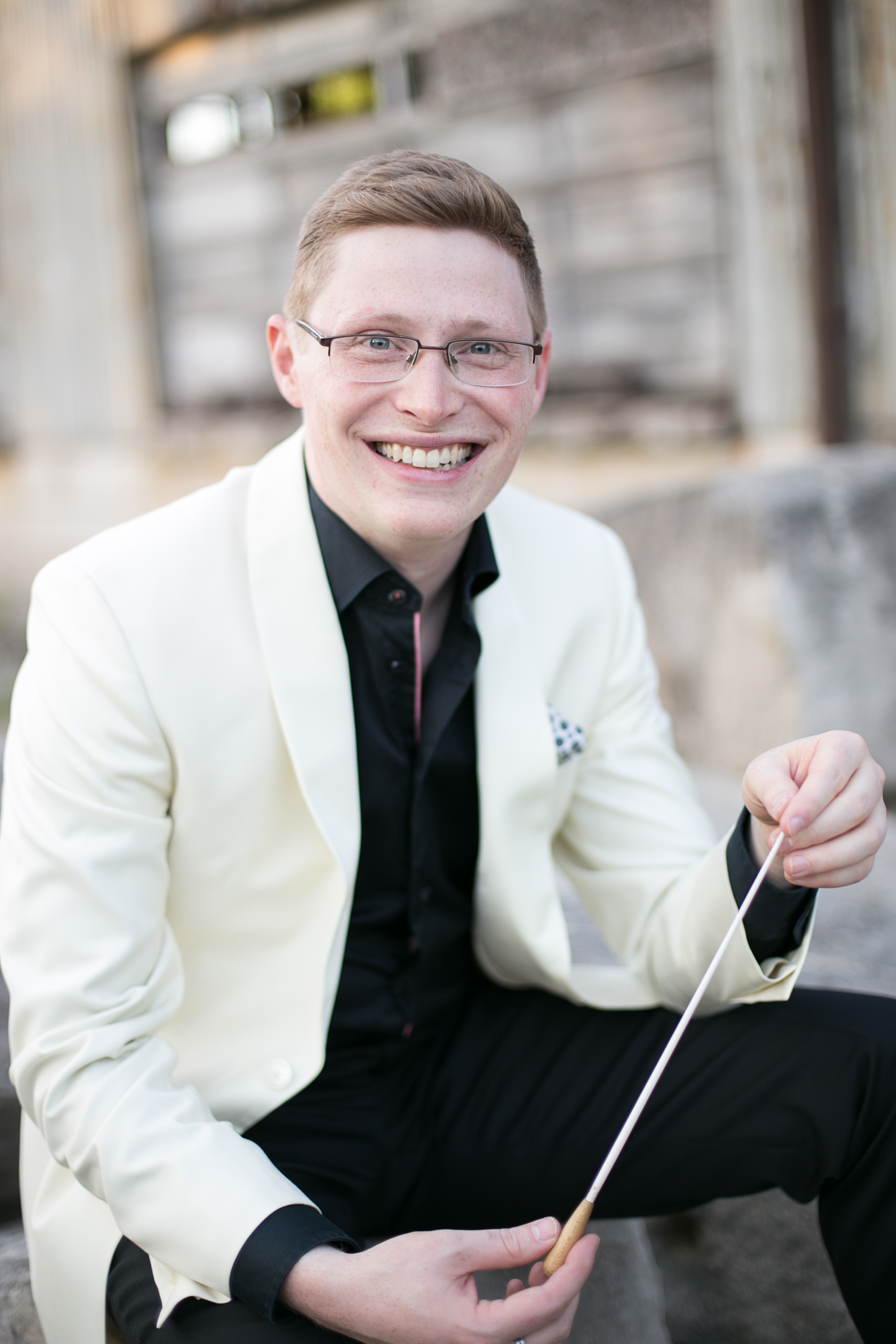

Background information
- Born: 1984 (age 40–41) New York, NY
- Genres: Classical music
- Occupations: Composer; Conductor; Professor
- Years active: 2005–present
- Website: www.dominickdiorio.com

Dominick DiOrio (born 1984) is an American composer and conductor. He is Professor of Music (Choral Conducting) at the Indiana University Jacobs School of Music and serves as the conductor of NOTUS, the Contemporary Vocal Ensemble, the fourth person since its founding in 1980. He is currently the artistic director of the Mendelssohn Chorus of Philadelphia.

== Career ==
DiOrio earned his BM in composition from Ithaca College and his MM and DMA in conducting from the Yale School of Music. His dissertation research on Krzysztof Penderecki’s St. Luke Passion was published in the Choral Scholar.

DiOrio has made notable contributions to choral music in the United States as an educator, a conductor, and a composer.

=== Educator ===
From 2009 to 2012, DiOrio served as the director of choral activities at Lone Star College-Montgomery. In 2012, he was appointed to the faculty at Indiana University. In 2014, Indiana University awarded DiOrio the Outstanding Junior Faculty Award.

=== Conductor ===
Since making his Carnegie Hall debut with the Young People’s Chorus of New York City in 2012, DiOrio has conducted performances with ensembles around the world including the Houston Chamber Choir and the American Bach Soloists. He has prepared choruses for conductors Valery Gergiev, Simon Carrington, Helmuth Rilling, and Krzysztof Penderecki, among others. During his tenure with NOTUS, they released their first commercial album. NOTUS was also selected to perform as one of the twenty-four choirs at the World Symposium on Choral Music in Auckland, New Zealand in July 2020. In 2019, NOTUS was awarded the winner of The American Prize in Choral Performance in the college/university division under his direction.

=== Composer ===
DiOrio’s works have been performed at major venues around the world including Carnegie Hall, Lincoln Center, and the Sydney Opera House. Gramophone described his style as “a tour de force of inventive thinking and unique color.” In 2014, he won The American Prize in Composition, the comments reading, “His depth of vision, mastery of compositional technique and unique style, set him in a category by himself.” In March 2019, the United States Marine Band and the Choral Arts Society of Washington premiered his work Silent Moves the Symphony True. The Washington Post described the work as "rhapsodic" with "impassioned vocal lines."

His numerous works are published through Hal Leonard, Boosey & Hawkes, Oxford University Press, G. Schirmer, and Santa Barbara Music Publishing.

== Recordings ==
- NOTUS: Of Radiance and Refraction (Innova Recordings, 2018)
