= Janice Lourie =

American computer scientist

- Born: July 9, 1930 (age 96)
- Education: Longy School of Music; Tufts University
- Known for: Pioneer in CAD/CAM
- Scientific career
- Fields: Computer technology Graphic artist
- Workplaces: IBM

Janice Richmond "Jan" Lourie (born July 9, 1930) is an American computer scientist and graphic artist. In the late 1960s she was a pioneer in CAD/CAM (computer-aided design/computer-aided manufacture) for the textile industry. She is best known for inventing a set of software tools that facilitate the textile production stream from artist to manufacturer. For the Graphical Design Of Textiles process she was granted IBM's first software patent. Other projects, in differing disciplines, share the focus on graphic representation. She returns throughout an ongoing career to the stacked two-dimensional tabular arrays of textiles and computer graphics, and the topological structures of interrelated data.

== Education ==
Lourie studied music theory and history at the Longy School of Music in Cambridge Massachusetts. Rosario Mazzeo was her clarinet teacher. She performed in chamber music concerts in the tapestry gallery series at the Boston Museum of Fine Arts and with amateur orchestras and chamber music groups in the Boston area. In 1954 she became a founding member of the Camerata of the Museum of Fine Arts. Her instruments were the tenor shawm and psaltery from the museum collection, and contemporary Dolmetsch recorders.

When she received her AB degree in philosophy from Tufts University she was employed as a technical editor at Parke Mathematical Laboratories in Concord, Mass. Her interest in the material she edited led to work at the MIT Whirlwind computer which she combined with basic mathematics courses. She returned to school and received a master's degree in mathematics from Boston University. (Note: the first computer science degree program in the United States was subsequently formed at Purdue University in 1962)

== IBM ==
In 1957 Lourie began working at IBM. At that time IBM was recruiting musicians to train as programmers. Her first assignment was to assist Dr. John (Giampiero) Rossoni who was in charge of the IBM part of the Operation Moonwatch Project then being conducted at the Smithsonian Astrophysical Observatory. (Note: It was a cooperative effort between Harvard University and IBM. A phase of the Moonwatch project was drawing to a close and awaited the verdict that the software was working. On the night of October 3, 1957 the teams from both Harvard and IBM were at the Smithsonian Observatory celebrating the working of the project, when shortly after midnight they received word that Russia had launched Sputnik!)

=== Operations research ===
Lourie's next assignment was in operations research, also known as management science. Her first major project was to implement the stepping stone algorithm of Abraham Charnes to solve the machine loading problem, a generalization of the classic linear transportation problem. In 1958 a software solution to the transportation problem was a staple operations research tool. The solution determines the pattern of delivery of one type of goods from multiple sources to multiple destinations satisfying all requirements at a minimum cost.

The generalized problem, expressed as machine loading, states that all the products may be different and may be produced on different machines. The variability of sources and destinations in this model has a drastic effect on the topological structure underlying the solution. The topology of each stage of an iterative solution in the transportation problem is a tree structure. In the generalized transportation problem the topological structure of the evolving iterative solution is a set of disconnected loops each with attached branched sidechains (trees).

Since each iteration of the generalized solution proceeding toward a minimum cost objective has a new assignment of products to machines, the topological structure of loops and chains at the beginning of an iteration is broken, and a new such structure is produced. Lourie analyzed the possible structures that could be created during iterations into 38 independent cases. The significance of the topological analysis is that it provided a verification method. The resulting paper, "Topology and computation of the generalized transportation problem," graphically represents the case analysis. The impact of this paper comes from the graphic representations of the original transportation problem in the stepping stone and simplex method formulations. The corresponding IBM program, released in 1959, used efficient list processing (tree tracing) techniques combined with a book-keeping system for managing the loops. (At the time LISP was being developed at MIT by John McCarthy).

=== Textile graphics/ Computer-aided ===
In 1959 IBM began working with General Motors on an early industrial computer-aided design (CAD) system, the DAC-1. The system used a light pen to draw on the screen of a visual display unit. The project was kept secret until the 1964 Fall Joint Computer Conference. At the same time IBM was working on commercial graphics products. Lourie worked on the programming for the prototype graphics terminal. The 2250 Graphical Display Unit was released in 1964 with the new System/360 computer.

Lourie had begun weaving at age seven and was an experienced weaver. In 1964 she proposed that IBM produce a CAD system for the textile industry.

Lourie made a proposal to IBM management, which was accepted, to develop a working system to translate artists’ designs into loom control information, and to develop the hardware and software to control the loom. Her first article, "The textile designer of the future," explained how working with a computer would give increased freedom to textile designers. "On-line textile designing" reviewed past attempts at automating the designing process and set forth reasons why the advent of interactive tools now made aspects of this goal feasible.

Lourie spent a year in three diverse textile manufacturing facilities, working alongside artists and designers, to learn the aesthetic judgments and technical skills needed to transform artwork to point paper – the preliminary representation of production control. When her software design was complete IBM filed a software patent in 1966. It was granted in 1970. It was IBM's first software patent. Related patents and later a book, Textile Graphics/Computer Aided.

The Textile Graphics project then undertook the natural extensions to printed and knitted fabrics, and woven fabrics produced on a dobby loom. The algebraic formulation of the designs produced on a dobby loom is described in an ACM paper. (Note: Fabrics with geometric designs are fabricated on a dobby loom. On the loom the warp, or vertical threads, instead of being independently controlleable (like the jacquard loom) are grouped in harnesses. All the threads in one harness must be raised and lowered together. The operating sequence of raising and lowering combinations of harnesses produces the geometry of the resulting fabric) Textile Graphics, known as GRITS (graphic interactive textile system) internally, was a precursor of today's tools that allow a personal computer user to "paint" closed areas of a design with color or patterns. The 1969 paper, "Computation of connected regions in interactive graphics", addresses the problem of automatically identifying and labeling the connected regions formed by sets of closed curves – a general problem encountered in interactive computer graphics. The first patent subsumes this capability. The subsequent patent related to connected regions, enlarged the scope of the procedure to arbitrarily large designs.

When preparation was underway for the 1968 San Antonio HemisFair, IBM chose the Textile Graphics system for its Durango pavilion. Visitors were able to draw the design on the screen and receive a swatch of woven fabric within three minutes. The complete system is described in an IFIPS paper. The visibility of both the process and the product made a clear statement of CAD/CAM. In his book, Computer History from Pascal to von Neumann, Herman Goldstine comments on the significance of this application.

Interactive computer tools – display screens, digital drawing tablets, lightpens and function keyboards – drew interest in creative applications. Museums and art organizations saw potential applications early. The Metropolitan Museum held a conference on the potential applications of computers in Museums in 1968.
