= Nicholas Van Slyck =

American composer

Nicholas Van Slyck (October 25, 1922 - July 3, 1983) was an American composer of classical music. He founded the New School of Music in Cambridge, Massachusetts in 1976.

== Early life ==
He was born in Philadelphia, Pennsylvania on October 25, 1922. He graduated from Kent School in Kent, Connecticut in 1940 and Harvard University (Class of 1944) where he studied with Walter Piston. He served in the United States Navy from March 1943 to June 1945 in World War II. He was a Seaman 2nd Class (Musician) and served with the 30th Construction Battalion (Seabees). While attending Harvard in the 1940s, he was also the director of the Harvard Chamber orchestra.

== Career ==
He was a composer and concert pianist. From 1950 to 1962, he was the director of the South End Music Center in Boston, Massachusetts and from 1962 to 1976, he was the director of the Longy School of Music of Bard College. From 1962 to 1967, he was the conductor of the Quincy Symphony.

He had his music performed by the Boston Civic Symphony. The Vermont Symphony Orchestra played his music at the 10 year anniversary of the New School.

== Honors ==
- 1983 Composer of the Year from Music Teachers National Association
