= Phoebe Carrai =

American cellist

- Born: October 15, 1955 (age 70); Boston, Massachusetts
- Occupations: Cellist, Music educator
- Instrument: Cello

Phoebe Carrai (born October 15, 1955 in Boston) is an American cellist.

Carrai studied at the New England Conservatory of Music in Boston where she earned both her Bachelor and Master of Music degrees. In 1979, Carrai undertook post-graduate studies in Historical Performance Practice with Nikolaus Harnoncourt at the Mozarteum in Salzburg.

In 1983, Phoebe Carrai joined the chamber music ensemble Musica Antiqua Köln. She worked with them for the next ten years and during that time taught at the Hilversum Conservatory in the Netherlands.

She now lives in the United States. She performs with the Arcadian Academy and the Philharmonia Baroque Orchestra (Nicholas McGegan); Ensemble Arion (Claire Guimond), Les Musiciens de Louvre (Marc Minkowski) and the Handel and Haydn Society (Jonathan Cohen). She has also performed with the Musica Angelica Baroque Orchestra.

== Teaching ==
Phoebe Carrai is a member of the faculties of the University of the Arts in Berlin and the Longy School of Music of Bard College in Cambridge, Massachusetts. She is also a founding member and co-director of the International Baroque Institute at Longy School of Music. Since 2009 she has been on the faculty of the Juilliard School in New York where her teaching includes Baroque Cello and Baroque Chamber Music.

Phoebe Carrai performs on an anonymous Italian cello from c.1690 and has recorded for Aetma, Deutsche Grammophon, Harmonia Mundi, Telarc, Decca and BMG.
