= 1989–90 Auburn Tigers men's basketball team =

American college basketball season

1989–90 Auburn Tigers men's basketball
- Conference: Southeastern Conference
- Record: 13–18 (8–10 SEC)
- Head coach: Tommy Joe Eagles (1st season)
- Captains: Derrick Dennison; Zane Arnold
- Home arena: Joel H. Eaves Memorial Coliseum

1989–90 Southeastern Conference men's basketball standings
	Conf.				Overall
Team	W		L	PCT	W		L	PCT
Georgia	13	–	5	.722	20	–	9	.690
No. 23 Alabama †	12	–	6	.667	26	–	9	.743
No. 19 LSU	12	–	6	.667	23	–	9	.719
Tennessee	10	–	8	.556	16	–	14	.533
Kentucky	10	–	8	.556	14	–	14	.500
Ole Miss	8	–	10	.444	13	–	17	.433
Auburn	8	–	10	.444	13	–	18	.419
Mississippi State	7	–	11	.389	16	–	14	.533
Vanderbilt	7	–	11	.389	21	–	14	.600
Florida	3	–	15	.167	7	–	21	.250
† 1990 SEC tournament winner Rankings from AP poll

The 1989–90 Auburn Tigers men's basketball team represented Auburn University in the 1989–90 college basketball season. The team's head coach was Tommy Joe Eagles, who was in his first season at Auburn. The team played their home games at Joel H. Eaves Memorial Coliseum in Auburn, Alabama. They finished the season 13–18, 8–10 in SEC play, good for seventh in the conference. They defeated LSU to advance to the semifinals of the SEC tournament where they lost to Alabama.

The team lost center Matt Geiger, who transferred to Georgia Tech.

Forward John Caylor returned from the previous season's blood clot issue with another season of eligibility and a solid season, playing in 28 of 31 games and averaging 8.7 points and 6.8 rebounds.

== Roster ==
1989–90 Auburn Tigers men's basketball team
Players
Coaches

Pos.	#	Name	Height	Weight	Year	Previous school	Hometown
F	22	John Caylor	6 ft 6 in (1.98 m)	—	Jr	Morristown West High School	Talbott, Tennessee
G	24	Derrick Dennison	6 ft 4 in (1.93 m)	—	Sr	Douglass High School	Atlanta, Georgia
G	14	Reggie Gallon	5 ft 10 in (1.78 m)	—	So	Miami Edison High School	Miami, Florida
G	20	Dustin Hester	6 ft 2 in (1.88 m)	—	Jr	Crestview High School	Crestview, Alabama
G	21	Ronnie Battle	6 ft 1 in (1.85 m)	—	So	Chavala High School	Pittsview, Alabama
G	3	Champ Wrencher	6 ft 1 in (1.85 m)	—	So	Ramsey High School	Birmingham, Alabama
G	15	Larry Patrick	6 ft 5 in (1.96 m)	—	Jr	Polk Community College	West Palm Beach, Florida
F	44	Chris Brandt	6 ft 6 in (1.98 m)	—	So	Auburn High School	Auburn, Alabama
F	31	Richard Smith	6 ft 6 in (1.98 m)	—	Jr	Pratt Community College	Chicago, Florida
F	40	Zane Arnold	6 ft 6 in (1.98 m)	—	Jr	Parker High School	Birmingham, Alabama
G	21	Marcus Ford	6 ft 5 in (1.96 m)	—	Fr	Finney High School	Detroit, Michigan

Head coach

- Tommy Joe Eagles

Assistant coach(es)

Legend

- (C) Team captain
- (S) Suspended
- (I) Ineligible
- (W) Walk-on
- Injured
- Current redshirt
