= Tom Gullion =

American jazz musician (born 1965)

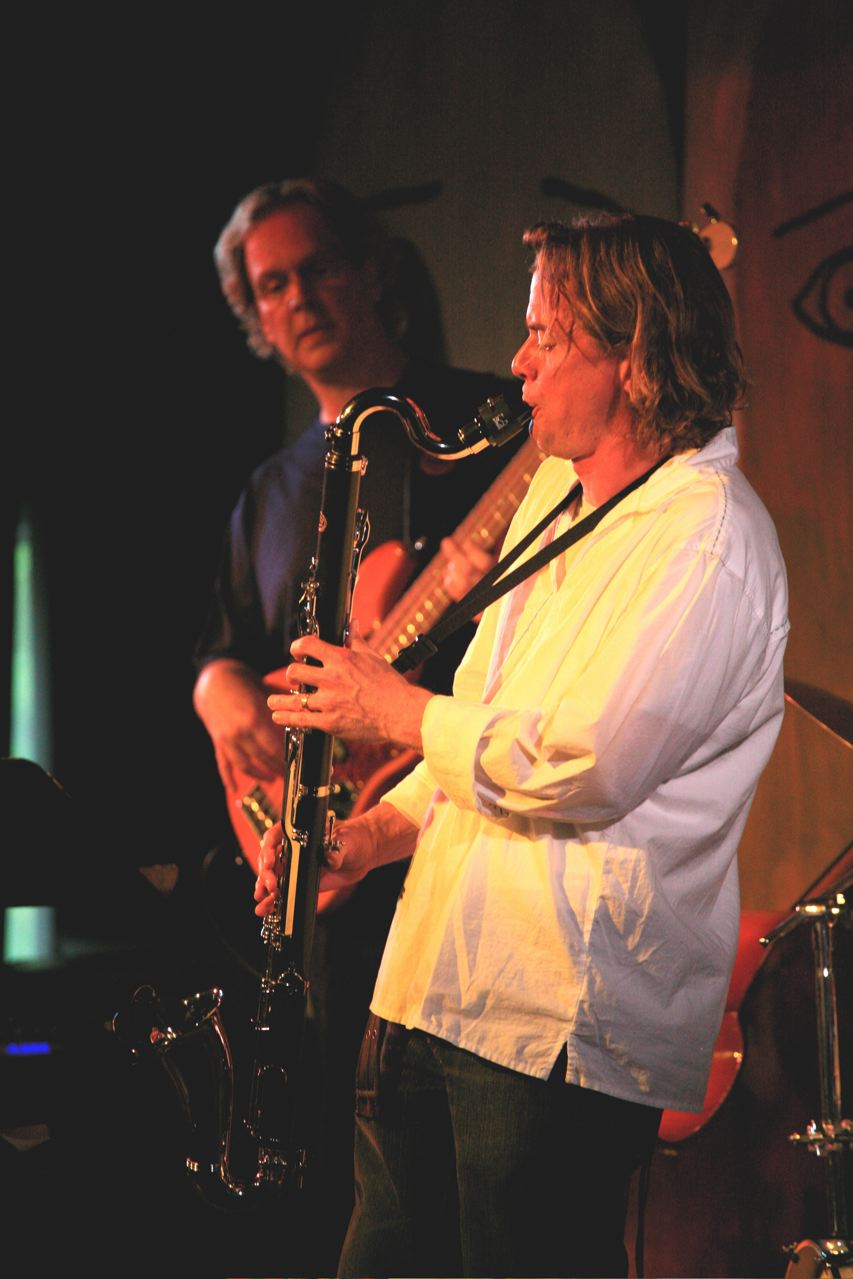
Geoffrey Lowe and Tom Gullion at the Driftless Jazz Festival, 2007

Tom Gullion (born July 25, 1965, Clinton, Indiana) is an American jazz saxophonist.

Gullion studied with David Baker at Indiana University. He began his professional career with trombonist J. J. Johnson. He and his wife, a classical violinist, moved to Spain, where she worked in an orchestra. Gullion recorded with the band Clunia and also provided music for movies and television. In 1995, they moved to Chicago, and Guillion attended graduate school at Northwestern University. Four years later, he released his debut solo album, Cat's Cradle (Naim, 1999).

== Discography ==
- Cat's Cradle (Naim, 1999)
- Greens and Blues (Naim, 2003)
- Catharsis (Ting Jing, 2006)
- Carswell (Ting Jing, 2009)
