= Susana Naidich =

Argentine singer and musicologist (1932–2023)

- Born: 1932; Buenos Aires, Argentina
- Died: 4 January 2023 (aged 90–91); Buenos Aires, Argentina
- Other name: Susana Naidic
- Education: University of Music and Performing Arts, Vienna
- Occupations: Singer; musicologist; phonologist; voice teacher; speech-language pathologist

Susana Naidich (Note: Her surname is also spelled Naidic.) (1932 – 4 January 2023) was an Argentine singer, musicologist, phonologist, voice teacher, and speech-language pathologist. She was the founder and first president of the Argentine Society of the Voice.

== Early years and education ==
Naidich was born in Buenos Aires. She studied at National Direction of Culture (Buenos Aires, 1949–50), University of Music and Performing Arts (Vienna, Austria, 1950–52), Collegium Musicum (Salzburg, Austria, 1951), Brandeis University (Waltham, Massachusetts, US, 1954–56), and Longy School of Music of Bard College (Cambridge, Massachusetts, 1954–56).

She made her singing debut at the age of 17 at the School of Opera, Teatro Colón in Buenos Aires. While studying in Vienna, she performed in the Salzburg Festival under the direction of Georg Solti.

== Career ==
After returning to Buenos Aires, she joined the cast of Teatro Colón, performing under the direction of Karl Böhm, Erich Kleiber, and Jean Martinón, among others. Simultaneously, she appeared as a soloist in other symphonic venues. In the United States, she sang in various festivals, including Tanglewood and Boston, accompanied by Aaron Copland and Leonard Bernstein. In 1963 and 1964, she worked in Israel, performing in concerts with orchestra and on camera. During this trip, she recorded Orpheus and Eurídice (of Christoph Willibald Gluck), Shéhérazade (of Maurice Ravel), The love wizard (of Manuel de Falla), and Songs Of A Wayfarer (of Gustav Mahler).

In 1967, while she continued her performance activities, she began to teach classes (private and institutional) in voice, sung and spoken, vocal technical elements for voice (without forcing the vocal cords), rehabilitation of functional problems (disfonías) related to organic (nodules, polyps and edemas) or by bad technical training, erroneous vocal classification (in singers) and abuse of the voice. In 1970, Naidich recorded the LP "Cantares de madre", lullabyes of diverse origins. The arrangements were under the direction of Eduardo Rovira. The re-release in 2000 included five black spirituals, in which Alberto Favero coordinated the orchestral direction. In 2002, she sang black spirituals and works of George Gershwin in duet with her daughter Alisa Kaufman in a popular music show called Verdadero Encanto in the Centro Cultural Borges.

Naidich speaks and writes in English, French, Italian, Hebrew and Portuguese. Her professional associations include: International Association of Logopedics and Phoniatrics, Collegium Medicorum Thetri, Argentinian association Logopedia and Foniatría, and Argentinian Society of the Voice, in which she was the founder and first president, between 2000 and 2003. Her publications have included "Principios de foniatría: para alumnos de canto y dicción", with Renato Segré and María Cristina (1993), as well as various publications on speech pathology.

On 13 June 2011, by the initiative of Eduardo Epszteyn, City of Buenos Aires, Naidich was honored as «personalidad destacada de la cultura».

Naidich died on 4 January 2023, at the age of 90–91.

== Notable students ==
- Norma Aleandro
- Amelita Baltar
- Cristina Banegas (actress and contralto)
- Graciela Borges
- Juan Darthés (actor and singer)
- Sergio Denis
- Julieta Díaz
- Antonio Gasalla
- Juan Carlos Gené (actor and theatre director).
- Araceli González
- Luisa Kuliok
- Libertad Lamarque (actress and singer)
- Soledad Pastorutti (singer)
- Susana Rinaldi (tango singer)

== Discography ==
- 1970: you Sang of mother. Madrigal Records
- 1974: Life and love of woman. Madrigal Records
- Susana Naidich: Gluck, Mahler, Ravel.
- Kol Israel, recorded live in Jerusalem (Israel)
- Susana Naidich: nanas, Gershwin, Of Fail, black spirituals
- Susana Naidich: Schumann, Brahms, Wolf.
- Recordings in LRA Radio Nacional, in Buenos Aires
- Recordings in Municipal Radio, in Buenos Aires
