= Adrián Patiño =

Military director and musician

Lieutenant Colonel Adrián Patiño Carpio
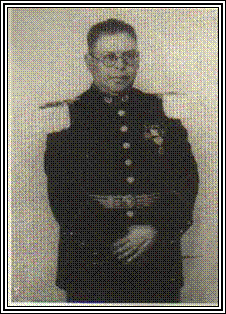
- Born: February 19, 1895; La Paz, Bolivia
- Died: April 4, 1951 (aged 56); La Paz, Bolivia
- Military career
- Allegiance: Bolivia
- Branch: Bolivian Army
- Service years: 1927-1951
- Rank: Lieutenant Colonel
- Conflicts: Chaco War

Adrián Patiño Carpio (19 February 1895 - 4 April 1951) was a prominent Bolivian military musician, band director, and music composer. Patiño was responsible for incorporate Bolivian popular folk tradition in the Bolivian Army.

== Biography and professional career ==
Adrián Patiño was born on 19 February 1895 in the capital of La Paz. In 1900, he began his primary and then his secondary studies in 1909, graduating in 1912 from the Don Bosco school. At the same time, he also studied music at the city's National Conservatory of Music. He later organized and directed different groups of student and orchestral groups.

Due to his recognized ability, Patiño was invited in 1926 to join the Band of the 4th Loa Infantry Regiment as director of the music, receiving the rank of second lieutenant. He rose to fame through his achievements in music band contests all over Latin America and particularly at an event in Argentina, where he performed his own compositions and the works of other international composers.

In July of that same year, Patiño successfully led the band from the 3rd Pérez Regiment who accompanied the Bolivian delegation invited to the inauguration of the monument of President Bartolomé Mitre in commemoration of the centennial of his birth. Once the Chaco War was over, Patiño was promoted to lieutenant colonel, with the position of General Director of the Army Music Bands, and presided over the Army Music School in Viacha for 15 years until his death in 1951. Patiño's patronage caused it to reach levels of professionalism and international recognition never seen in the country.

Adrián Patiño died in the city of La Paz on 4 April 1951 at the age of 56.

== Legacy ==
The Military School of Music of the Army (Escuela Militar de Musica del Ejercito) was created by Supreme Decree on 20 May 1889 and it assumed the name of "Tcnl. Adrián Patiño" in 1951. It was the result of petitions from the ex-prisoners of the Chaco War. Khunuskiwa (Nevando Está) is a march that was made in honor of him. His musical productions from his military service continues to be used this day in civic and military parades. The most notable of these marches include the Presidential March and the Police Hymn.

== Works ==
=== Military Marches ===
- Go Ahead Collasuyu
- Union Make Force
- Zalles March
- Peru-Bolivian Fellowship
- Philharmonic May 1st
- The patriotism of the worker, Copacabana
- Glorious Clarín del Chaco
- Presidential March (dedicated to President Tcnl. Germán Busch)
- Called Loa
- Pérez Regiment
- Lonely Star
- Guard of honor
- General Carlos Quintanilla Quiroga
- Laurels
- Laurels and gold stars
- Through the vast field of Sport
- Honor and lealty
- Sergeant Tejerina
- Healthy and Strong or Hymn to the Bolivian athlete
- The Sergeants
- Memories of Bolivia
- Beni
- Student Union
- Bolivian Conscript
- Tricolor Flag
- The Athlete

=== Funeral Marches ===
- Mother listen to my prayer
- Peace, glory and memory
- My heart weeps at your departure

=== Hymns ===
- Hymn of the Military College of the Army
- Hymn to the Bolivian Sportsman
- Hymn to the Red Cross
- Pre-Military Choral March
- Hymn to the Cavalry Weapon
- Hymn of the Bolivian Socialist Phalanx
- Police Anthem
- The Strongest Club Anthem
- Anthem of the Lourdes School

=== Fox-trots ===
- Heart of gold
- Adored Eleníta
- Cantumarqueñita
- Lurpila
- Irpaveñita
- Irpastay
- La Huerta
- Wake up sweetheart
- My little shepherdess
- Darling
- Q'uniskiwa or Snowing Is
- Andean dawn
