= Elisa Patiño Meléndez =

Spanish (Galician) aviator (1890-1919)

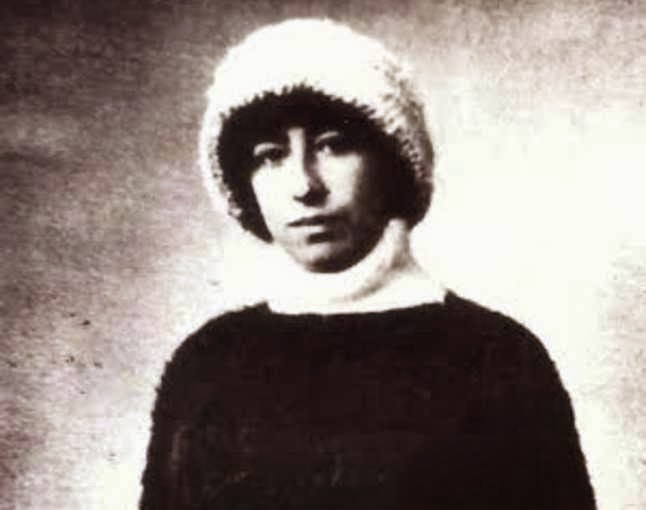
- Born: 1890; Pontevedra, Spain
- Died: 12 April 1919 (aged 28–29); Pontevedra, Spain
- Other name: Chichana or Chichana Patiño
- Occupation: Aviator
- Spouse: Enrique Alcaraz
- Children: Lucia Alcaraz Patiño
- Parents: Albino Patiño Amado, Duke of Patiño (father); Rosa Meléndez (mother)

Elisa Patiño Meléndez (1890 – 12 April 1919) was the first women of Galician descent to become a pilot. She was well known by her nickname Chichana or Chichana Patiño.

== Biography ==
Chichana was the daughter of Albino Patiño Amado, Duke of Patiño, and his wife Rosa Meléndez. In August 1916, in Pontesampaio, she married Enrique Alcaraz Diez, Secretary of Health in the port of Corcubion, and in June 1917 their daughter Lucia Alcaraz Patiño was born.

=== Early life ===
As an educated young woman, Chichana sang and painted, and she learned to play the violin and piano. Garcia quoted an observer of one of her performances,

"She also offered us the gift of her melodious voice, singing, behind the scenes, vibrant Andalusian flavor songs with a purity of accent and diction."

=== Flying legend ===
Chichana's first flying experience came at the age of 23 when she accompanied pilot José Piñeiro González for several demonstrations aboard his Bleriot aircraft in northwestern Spain. A quote in the local paper said he was a "remarkable aviator. He never had accidents with [Chichana] and he always said: She is the fairy of my triumphs."

She flew as pilot for the first time on 12 October 1913, at Baltar Beach on the Atlantic Ocean in Sanxenxo Spain, an achievement that was noted in the local newspaper, the Correo de Galicia: "Last Sunday, Piñeiro surprised the residents of Sanxenxo with a superb flight made in very interesting circumstances" When they descended the crowd greeted them with an ovation.

No record has been found confirming that Chichana received an official pilot's license, but in that era an official license was obtained only after recording fifty hours of flight time.

=== Final days ===
Chichana died as a young woman in 1919 from the Spanish flu "after a long illness, suffered with real resignation, surrounded by the care and affection of her loving family."

On her death, her daughter inherited the Duchy of Patiño.

Many years later, on July 28, 1964, according to Bará, "'the BOE [Boletín Oficial del Estado (in English: Official State Gazette)] published the following legal notice about Lucia. "The title of Duque de Patiño is restored, with the dignity of Marquis in favor of Doña Lucía Alcaraz Patiño,' daughter of Chichana."
