= Pitino =

Pitino is a surname. Notable people with the surname include:

- Richard Pitino (born 1982), American basketball coach, son of Rick
- Rick Pitino (born 1952), American basketball coach

== See also ==
- Patiño
