= Jacobs School of Music =

Public music college in Bloomington, Indiana, U.S.

Coordinates: 39°9′55″N 86°31′2″W

Location
- 1201 East Third Street; Bloomington, Indiana

Information
- Type: Public
- Established: 1921; 105 years ago
- Dean: Abra K. Bush
- Faculty: 250
- Enrollment: More than 1,500
- Campus: Bloomington, Indiana, U.S.
- Website: music.indiana.edu

The Jacobs School of Music is the music school of Indiana University Bloomington in Bloomington, Indiana, United States.

Established in 1921, the school was known as the Indiana University School of Music until 2005, when it became the Jacobs School. The school offers graduate and undergraduate degrees in performance (classical, jazz, voice, ballet, contemporary dance, theatre), music business, music education, musicology, music theory, composition, and technology (audio engineering, music production, scoring).

Approximately 1,600 students from all 50 U.S. states and more than 55 countries study in a conservatory atmosphere amidst the academic resources of a major research university.

Approximately half of the school's students are undergraduates, with the second-largest enrollment of all music schools accredited by the National Association of Schools of Music.

== History ==
In 1910, Charles D. Campbell was appointed professor of music and head of the new Department of Music at Indiana University. Barzille Winfred Merrill succeeded Campbell in 1919, and the Department of Music was officially renamed to the School of Music in 1921.

In 1948, IU Opera Theater began with Jacques Offenbach’s The Tales of Hoffmann.

The Latin American Music Center was founded in 1961, followed by the Jazz Studies Department in 1968, by David N. Baker, and the Historical Performance Institute in 1980, by Thomas Binkley.

In 2005, the school was renamed the Indiana University Jacobs School of Music following a donation from Barbara B. and David H. Jacobs.

In 2009, the school received a gift from the family of Leonard Bernstein that included the entire contents of Bernstein's conducting studio.

== Academics and programs ==
=== Admissions ===
Admission to the Jacobs School of Music is contingent on a live or recorded audition, a formal application, admission to Indiana University itself, and sometimes a recorded prescreen tape. The overall acceptance rate is generally about 25 percent for undergraduate students and about 30 percent for graduate students. However, acceptance rates vary greatly between programs. Each freshman class contains about 200 new students. The class of 2030 is the largest freshman class in the school's history so far.

=== Ensembles ===
The school contains six bands, five jazz bands, eight orchestras, seven choral ensembles, as well as a myriad of other large and small ensembles (Percussion Ensemble, Latin American Ensemble, Jazz Combos, etc.). Between all ensembles, the Jacobs School of Music holds more than 1,100 performances a year.

The school is also home to two contemporary music ensembles: the New Music Ensemble, founded by former professor Frederick A. Fox in 1975, and currently directed by David Dzubay, and NOTUS, a 24-voice choir that specializes in contemporary choral repertoire and especially the works of living composers. Directed by Dominick DiOrio, the ensemble frequently premieres works by students, faculty, and emerging professional composers and frequently tours nationally.

=== Opera ===
The opera program at the Jacobs School has presented more than 500 productions since it began in 1948. Indiana University Jacobs School of Music Opera Theater currently produces five operas and one musical each year. It frequently performs classics by composers such as Donizetti, Mozart, Puccini, and Verdi, and also Baroque operas by Handel as well as contemporary works by Mason Bates, Jonathan Dove, and Jake Heggie, among others.

=== Programs of study ===
The school offers Bachelor of Music (B.M.), Bachelor of Music Education (B.M.E.), Bachelor of Science (B.S.), Master of Arts (M.A.), Master of Music (M.M.), Doctor of Philosophy (Ph.D.), and Doctor of Music (D.M.) degrees.

Jacobs also awards a Performer's Certificate or Artist's Diploma. The school offers degrees in Historical Performance, and it is possible for students to enroll in a unique degree program available at Indiana University known as the Bachelor of Science in an Outside Field (B.S.O.F.) in some select areas of study.

== Facilities ==
=== Musical Arts Center ===
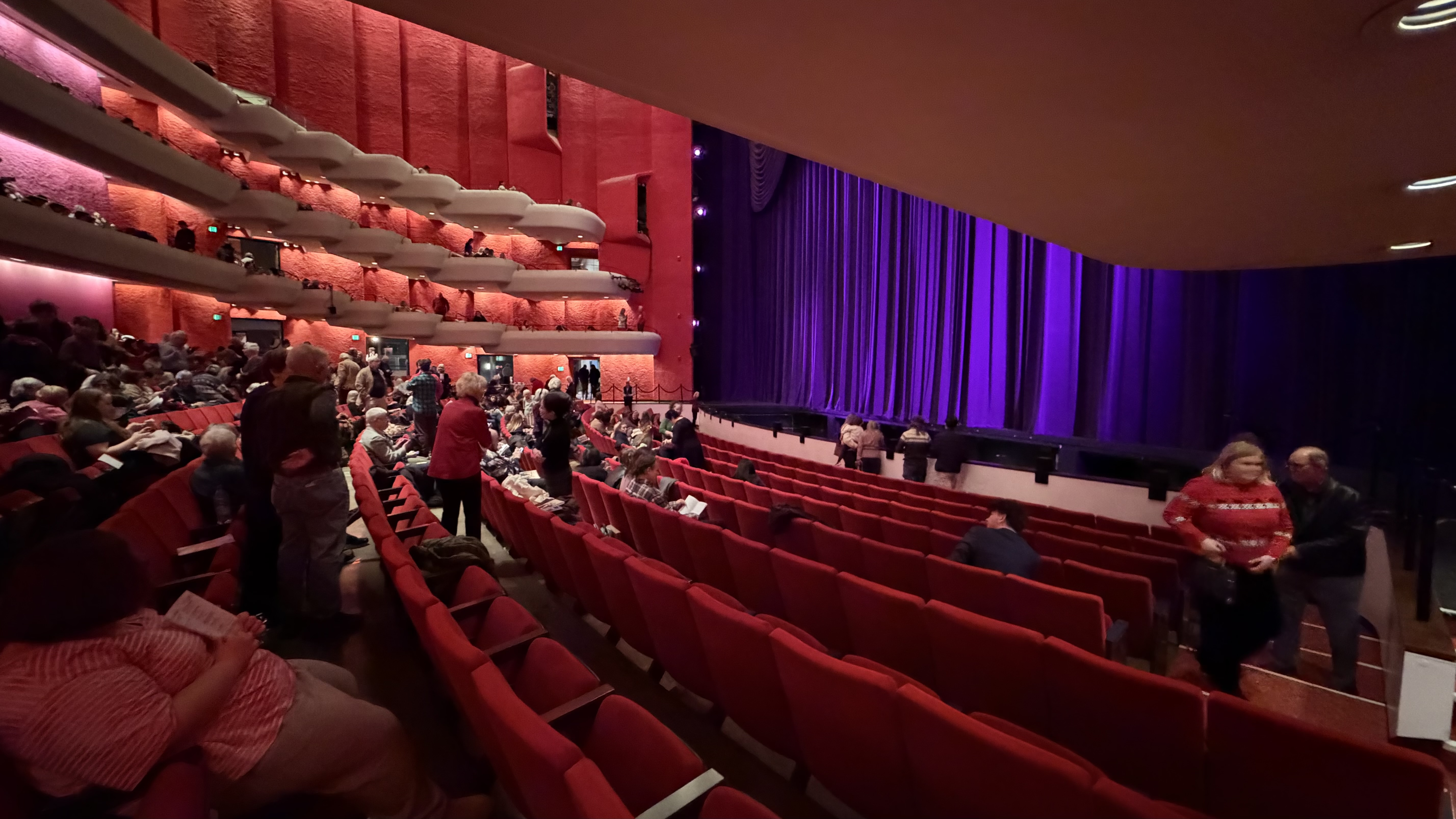
Musical Arts Center

The Musical Arts Center was designed by architect Evans Woollen III and completed in 1972. It is an example of Brutalist architecture. The facility is equipped with European-style seating for 1,460 and space for a 100-piece orchestra, as well as studios, classrooms, and rehearsal studios for opera and ballet.

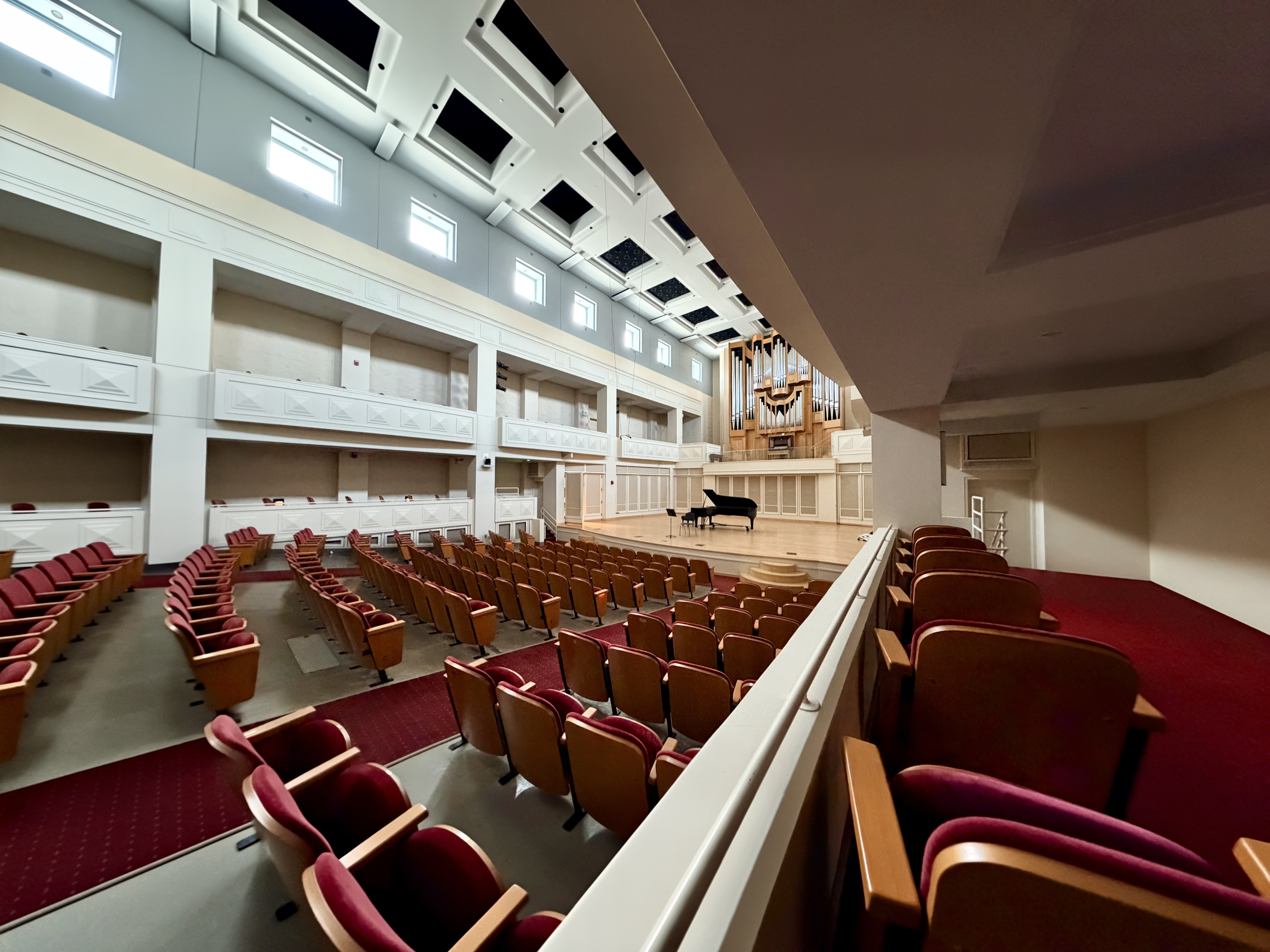
Auer Hall

=== Auer Hall ===
Located on the second floor of the Simon Music Center, Auer Hall was made possible by a $1 million gift from Ione B. Auer. The 400-seat auditorium is home to the Maidee H. and Jackson A. Seward Organ, also known as C. B. Fisk, Op. 135. The instrument has nearly 4,000 pipes, and was realized through a gift from the Sewards.

=== Ford-Crawford Hall ===
This 100-seat auditorium was funded by a gift from Richard E. Ford.

=== Recital Hall ===
The recital hall, which is seven decades old and seats 500, has hosted many world-famous musicians.

=== Ray E. Cramer Marching Hundred Hall ===
This building contains a dedicated rehearsal space for the Marching Hundred, plus two additional rehearsal rooms.

=== Conrad Prebys Amphitheater ===
Seating 275 guests, this small amphitheater holds performances from many departments of the Jacobs School of Music as well as performances from visiting guests and artists.

=== IU Auditorium ===
While not a permanent residence of the school, the Jacobs School of Music regularly performs in this 3,200-seat auditorium.

=== Alumni Hall ===
Located in the Indiana Memorial Union, this venue is commonly used for organ concerts and recitals thanks to its substantial 2,838 pipe organ (C. B. Fisk, Op. 91) which was relocated from Jacques M. Littlefield estate in 2012.

=== East Studio Building ===
The building was completed in August 2013. It's a practice and studio building which is home to admissions and faculty offices as well as the percussion department.

=== Simon Music Center ===
The Simon Music Center opened in 1995. The William and Gayle Cook Music Library is located there.

Classroom in Music Addition

=== Music Addition ===
The Music Addition contains many practice rooms as well as rehearsal spaces for both large and small ensembles.

=== Merrill Hall ===
Merrill Hall contains mostly instructional and administrative offices. The Recital Hall is located in Merrill Hall.

=== Musical Arts Center Addition ===
The Musical Arts Center Addition contains multiple large rehearsal and recording facilities.

=== Music Practice Building ===
Located across from the campus on E 3rd Street, this building contains practice rooms for Jacobs School of Music students.

== Notable alumni ==
- Jamey Aebersold, jazz educator
- Kenny Aronoff, drumset
- David Baker, jazz composer
- Jamie Barton, mezzo-soprano
- Joshua Bell, violinist
- Noah Bendix-Balgley, violinist, 1st concertmaster of Berlin Philharmonic
- Jonathan Biss, pianist, professor at Curtis Institute of Music
- Julian Bliss, clarinetist, clarinet designer
- Chris Botti, jazz trumpeter
- Michael Brecker, jazz saxophonist
- Carl Broemel, lead guitarist/vocalist/saxophone for My Morning Jacket
- Angela Brown, soprano
- Lawrence Brownlee, tenor
- William Burden, tenor
- Angelin Chang, Grammy award-winning pianist, professor of music and law at Cleveland State University
- Frederic Chiu, pianist
- John Clayton, jazz and classical bassist, composer and arranger
- Richard Cowan, opera singer
- Kathryn Day, soprano
- Jeremy Denk, pianist
- Alexandra du Bois, composer
- Peter Erskine, jazz drummer and educator
- Jack Everly, conductor
- Miriam Fried, violinist and pedagogue, winner of Queen Elisabeth Competition
- Vivica Genaux, mezzo soprano
- Tom Gullion, jazz saxophonist
- Jeff Hamilton, jazz drummer
- Christopher Harding, pianist, professor at University of Michigan
- Hu Nai-yuan, violinist, winner of Queen Elisabeth Competition
- Bruce Hubbard, Broadway, Metropolitan Opera baritone and recording artist
- Jacques Israelievitch, violinist, former concertmaster of the Toronto Symphony
- Booker T. Jones, songwriter, producer, frontman for Booker T. & the M.G.'s
- Karen Kamensek, Grammy Award winning orchestral and opera conductor, former general music director Staatsoper Hannover
- Paul Katz, cellist, founding member of the Cleveland Quartet
- Kevin Langan, bass
- Wilbur Lin, conductor
- Kate Lindsey, mezzo soprano
- Emily Magee, soprano
- Sylvia McNair, soprano
- Kristin Merscher, pianist, professor at Hochschule für Musik Saar
- Edgar Meyer, bassist, composer, and pedagogue, MacArthur Fellow, professor at the Curtis Institute of Music
- Fatma Ceren Necipoğlu, Turkish harpist
- Michael Palmer, conductor
- William Pell, tenor
- Shawn Pelton, session drummer
- Ailyn Pérez, soprano
- Behzad Ranjbaran, composer, professor at Juilliard School
- Benny Reid, jazz saxophonist, music producer, and composer.
- Larry Ridley, jazz bassist and music educator
- Miguel Roig-Francolí, composer and music theorist
- Byron Schenkman, harpsichordist, pianist
- Nathan Schram, Grammy Award-winning violist and composer
- Sean Shepherd, composer
- Leonard Slatkin, conductor, music director of Detroit Symphony Orchestra
- Susan Slaughter, orchestral trumpeter
- Sybille Specht, German mezzo-soprano
- Elizabeth Stanley, Broadway actress
- Patrick Summers, conductor, artistic and music director of Houston Grand Opera
- Gwen Thompson, violinist
- Doron Toister, composer and cellist
- Michael Weiss, jazz pianist and composer
- Wendy White, mezzo-soprano
- Pharez Whitted, jazz
- Jennifer Widom, computer science professor at Stanford University
- Caleb Young, conductor
- Don Yule, bass
