= Don Freund =

American classical composer

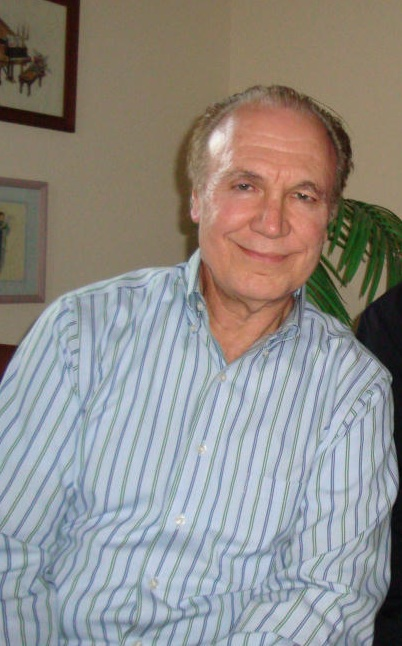
- Don Freund at home in 2008
- Born: 1947 (age 78–79); Pittsburgh, Pennsylvania
- Occupations: Classical composer; Music professor

Don Freund (born 1947, Pittsburgh, Pennsylvania) is an American composer, pianist, and Professor of Composition at the Indiana University Jacobs School of Music. His over 100 performed works, include solo, chamber, and orchestral music, live performance with electronic instruments, large theatre works.

He has received several awards for his work, including a Guggenheim Fellowship and grants from the National Endowment for the Arts.

== Education ==
Don Freund earned his bachelor's at Duquesne University in 1969. Both his master's degree and doctorate were earned at the Eastman School of Music in 1970 and 1972, respectively.

== Professorship ==
Don Freund began his professorship in 1972 as chair of Memphis State University's composition department. In 1992, Freund moved to working at the Indiana University Jacobs School of Music, where he remains.

=== The Spectrum of Fifths ===
Freund developed the theory of the spectrum of fifths as a way to explain why different musical modes have different emotional connotations. The spectrum comes from the circle of fifths, commonly used as a tool to teach a multitude of subjects to young music students, from harmony to scales.

Any particular note, if heard with another directly to its right on the spectrum, can be considered a parent note. The note to the right is the child note. All parent notes are relatively flatter, or darker, than their relatively sharper, brighter, child notes.

== Recordings ==
- New Music From Indiana University Vol 4 - Don Freund Madame Bovary Suite, Soft Cells, Concerto for Viola, Dissolving Music:Indiana University Concert Orchestra, Indiana University New Music Ensemble, Indiana University Chamber Orchestra conducted by Don Freund, David Dzubay, and Paul Biss. Indiana University 10.

== Sources ==
- Jens Staubrand: Kierkegaard International Bibliography Music Works and Plays, Copenhagen 2009. In English and Danish. ISBN 978-87-92510-05-1. Including Don Freund's FEAR AND TREMBLING BLUES, 1983
- Don Freund, Composition Department, Jacobs School of Music
- Interview with Don Freund by George Walker (September 18, 2009), accessed 28 January 2010
