= 1989–90 Big East Conference men's basketball season =

American college basketball season

1989–90 Big East Conference Men's Basketball Season
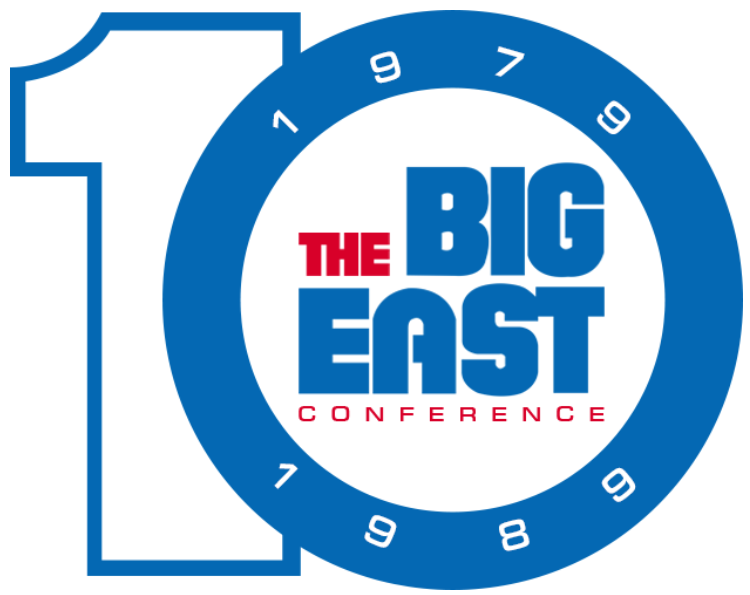
- League: NCAA Division I
- Sport: Basketball
- Duration: November 16, 1989 through March 11, 1990
- Teams: 9
- TV partner: ESPN

Regular Season
- Champion: Connecticut and Syracuse (12–4)
- Season MVP: Derrick Coleman – Syracuse

Tournament
- Champions: Connecticut
- Finals MVP: Chris Smith – Connecticut

Basketball seasons
- 1988–89 1990–91

1989–90 Big East men's basketball standings
	Conf.				Overall
Team	W		L	PCT	W		L	PCT
No. 4 Connecticut†	12	–	4	.750	31	–	6	.838
No. 6 Syracuse	12	–	4	.750	26	–	7	.788
No. 8 Georgetown	11	–	5	.688	24	–	7	.774
St. John's	10	–	6	.625	24	–	10	.706
Villanova	8	–	8	.500	18	–	15	.545
Providence	8	–	8	.500	17	–	12	.586
Seton Hall	5	–	11	.313	12	–	16	.429
Pittsburgh	5	–	11	.313	12	–	17	.414
Boston College	1	–	15	.063	8	–	20	.286
† 1990 Big East tournament winner As of April 2, 1990; Rankings from AP Poll

The 1989–90 Big East Conference men's basketball season was the 11th in conference history, and involved its nine full-time member schools.

Connecticut and Syracuse were the regular-season co-champions with identical records of (12–4). Connecticut won the Big East tournament championship.

== Season summary & highlights ==
- Connecticut and Syracuse were the regular-season co-champions with identical records of (12–4). It was Connecticut's first and Syracuse's fourth regular-season championship or co-championship.
- Connecticut won its first Big East tournament championship.

== Head coaches ==
School	Coach	Season	Notes
Boston College	Jim O'Brien	4th	
Connecticut	Jim Calhoun	4th	Big East Coach of the Year
Georgetown	John Thompson Jr.	18th	
Pittsburgh	Paul Evans	4th	
Providence	Rick Barnes	2nd	
St. John's	Lou Carnesecca	20th	
Seton Hall	P. J. Carlesimo	8th	
Syracuse	Jim Boeheim	14th	
Villanova	Rollie Massimino	15th	

== Rankings ==
Georgetown and Syracuse were ranked in the Top 25 of the Associated Press poll all season: Syracuse never dropped below No. 11 and was ranked No. 1 for six consecutive weeks, and Georgetown never dropped below No. 8 and was ranked in the Top Five for most of the season, reaching as high as No. 2. Connecticut, St. John's, and Pittsburgh also appeared in the Top 25.

1989–90 Big East Conference Weekly Rankings Key: ██ Increase in ranking. ██ Decrease in ranking.
AP Poll	Pre	11/27	12/4	12/11	12/18	12/25	1/1	1/8	1/15	1/22	1/29	2/5	2/12	2/19	2/26	3/5	Final
Boston College																	
Connecticut										20	13	8	10	6	4	8	4
Georgetown	5	3	3	3	3	3	3	2	2	3	6	5	3	5	7	5	8
Pittsburgh	18	18	22														
Providence																	
St. John's	25	20	15	18	19	17	16	15	15	15	18	24	24				
Seton Hall																	
Syracuse	3	1	1	1	1	1	1	6	5	11	7	6	4	11	10	4	6
Villanova																	

== Regular-season statistical leaders ==
Scoring
Name	School	PPG
Brian Shorter	Pitt	20.6
Mark Tillmon	GU	19.8
Jason Matthews	Pitt	19.1
Billy Owens	Syr	18.2
Malik Sealy	SJU	18.1

Rebounding
Name	School	RPG
Derrick Coleman	Syr	12.1
Dikembe Mutombo	GU	10.5
Brian Shorter	Pitt	9.4
Anthony Avent	SHU	9.4
Alonzo Mourning	GU	8.5

Assists
Name	School	APG
Darelle Porter	Pitt	7.9
Carlton Screen	Prov	7.0
Dwayne Bryant	GU	5.7
Boo Harvey	SJU	5.5
Michael Edwards	Syr	5.1

Steals
Name	School	SPG
Nadav Henefeld	Conn	3.7
Eric Murdock	Prov	2.8
Carlton Screen	Prov	2.4
Billy Owens	Syr	2.2
Malik Sealy	SJU	2.2

Blocks
Name	School	BPG
Dikembe Mutombo	GU	4.1
Alonzo Mourning	GU	2.2
Derrick Coleman	Syr	2.0
Tom Greis	Vill	2.0
Robert Werdann	SJU	1.9

Field Goals
Name	School	FG%
Michael Cooper	SHU	.557
Derrick Coleman	Syr	.551
Bobby Martin	Pitt	.537
Brian Shorter	Pitt	.532
Malik Sealy	SJU	.525

3-Pt Field Goals
Name	School	3FG%
Jason Matthews	Pitt	.457
Terry Dehere	SHU	.390
(no other qualifiers)

Free Throws
Name	School	FT%
Jason Matthews	Pitt	.892
Carlton Screen	Prov	.866
Greg Woodard	Vill	.830
Chris Walker	Vill	.826
Rod Brookin	Pitt	.824

== Postseason ==
=== Big East tournament ===
==== Seeding ====
Seeding in the Big East tournament was based on conference record, with tiebreakers applied as necessary. The eighth- and ninth-seeded teams played a first-round game, and the other seven teams received a bye into the quarterfinals.

The tournament's seeding was as follows: (1) Syracuse, (2) Connecticut, (3) Georgetown, (4) St. John's, (5) Villanova, (6) Providence, (7) Seton Hall, (8) Pittsburgh, (9) Boston College.

==== Bracket ====
First round March 8, 1990
8	Pittsburgh	88
9	Boston College	70

Quarterfinals; March 9, 1990
1	#4 Syracuse	58
8	Pittsburgh	55
4	St. John's	60
5	Villanova	70
3	#5 Georgetown	78
6	Providence	77
2	#8 Connecticut	76
7	Seton Hall	58

Semifinals; March 10, 1990
1	#4 Syracuse	73
5	Villanova	61
3	#5 Georgetown	60
2	#8 Connecticut	65

Championship Game; March 11, 1990
1	#4 Syracuse	75
2	#8 Connecticut	78

=== NCAA tournament ===
Six Big East teams received bids to the NCAA Tournament, with Connecticut seeded No. 1 in the East Region. Providence and Villanova lost in the first round and Georgetown and St. John's in the second round. Syracuse was defeated in the regional semifinals and Connecticut in the East Region final.

School	Region	Seed	Round 1	Round 2	Sweet 16	Elite 8
Connecticut	East	1	16 Boston University, W 76–52	11 California, W 74–54	5 Clemson, W 71–70	3 Duke, L 79–78^{(OT)}
Syracuse	Southeast	2	15 Coppin State, W 70–48	7 Virginia, W 63–61	6 Minnesota, L 82–75	
Georgetown	Midwest	3	14 Texas Southern, W 70–52	6 Xavier, L 74–71		
St. John's	East	6	11 Temple, W 81–65	3 Duke, L 76–72		
Providence	West	9	8 Ohio State, L 84–83			
Villanova	West	12	5 LSU, L 70–63			

=== National Invitation Tournament ===
No Big East teams received bids to the National Invitation Tournament

== Awards and honors ==
=== Big East Conference ===
Player of the Year:

- * Derrick Coleman, Syracuse, F Sr.

Defensive Co-Players of the Year:

- Alonzo Mourning, Georgetown, C, So.
- Dikembe Mutombo, Georgetown, C Jr.

Rookie of the Year:

- Nadav Henefeld, Connecticut, F, Fr.

Coach of the Year:

- Jim Calhoun, Connecticut (4th season)

All-Big East First Team

- Alonzo Mourning, Georgetown, C, So. 6 ft 10 in (208 cm), 261 lb (118 kg), Chesapeake, Va.
- Mark Tillmon, Georgetown, G Sr. 6 ft 2 in (188 cm), 190 lb (86 kg), Little Rock, Ark.
- Brian Shorter, Pittsburgh, F Jr., 6 ft 6 in (198 cm), 242 lb (110 kg), Philadelphia, Pa.
- Boo Harvey, St. John's, G Sr., 5 ft 11 in (180 cm), 165 lb (75 kg), Queens, N.Y.
- Billy Owens, Syracuse, F, So., 6 ft 8 in (203 cm), 220 lb (100 kg), Carlisle, Pa.
- Derrick Coleman, Syracuse, F Sr., 6 ft 10 in (208 cm), 258 lb (117 kg), Mobile, Ala.

All-Big East Second Team:

- Chris Smith, Connecticut, G, So., 5 ft 11 in (180 cm), 163 lb (74 kg), Bridgeport, Conn.
- Dikembe Mutombo, Georgetown, C Jr., 7 ft 2 in (218 cm), 260 lb (118 kg), Léopoldville, Congo
- Carlton Screen, Providence, G Sr., 6 ft 0 in (183 cm), 158 lb (72 kg), Brooklyn, N.Y.
- Malik Sealy, St. John's, F, So., 6 ft 8 in (203 cm), 200 lb (91 kg), The Bronx, N.Y.
- Stephen Thompson, Syracuse, G Sr., 6 ft 4 in (193 cm), 185 lb (84 kg), Los Angeles, Calif.

All-Big East Third Team:

- Nadav Henefeld, Connecticut, F, Fr., 6 ft 7 in (201 cm), 236 lb (107 kg), Ramat Hasharon, Israel
- Tate George, Connecticut, G Sr., 6 ft 5 in (196 cm), 190 lb (86 kg), Newark, N.J.
- Dwayne Bryant, Georgetown, G Sr., 6 ft 2 in (188 cm), 190 lb (86 kg), New Orleans, La.
- Jason Matthews, Pittsburgh, G Jr. 6 ft 3 in (191 cm)
- Eric Murdock, Providence, G Jr., 6 ft 1 in (185 cm), 190 lb (86 kg), Somerville, N.J.
- Marty Conlon, Providence, F Sr. 6 ft 10 in (208 cm), 224 lb (102 kg), The Bronx, N.Y.

Big East All-Rookie Team:

- Nadav Henefeld, Connecticut, F, Fr., 6 ft 7 in (201 cm), 236 lb (107 kg), Ramat Hasharon, Israel
- Scott Burrell, Connecticut, G, Fr., 6 ft 7 in (201 cm), 218 lb (99 kg), New Haven, Conn.
- Terry Dehere, Seton Hall, G, Fr., 6 ft 2 in (188 cm), 190 lb (86 kg), Jersey City, N.J.
- Michael Edwards, Syracuse, G, Fr., 5 ft 11 in (180 cm), Voorhees, N.J.
- Lance Miller, Villanova, F, Fr., 6 ft 7 in (201 cm), Bridgewater, N.J.

=== All-Americans ===
The following players were selected to the 1990 Associated Press All-America teams.

Consensus All-America First Team:

- Derrick Coleman, Syracuse, Key Stats: 17.9 ppg, 12.1 rpg, 2.9 apg, 1.9 spg, 55.1 FG%, 36.6 3P%, 591 points

Consensus All-America Second Team:

- Alonzo Mourning, Georgetown, Key Stats: 16.5 ppg, 8.5 rpg, 2.2 bpg, 52.5 FG%, 510 points

First Team All-America:

- Derrick Coleman, Syracuse, Key Stats: 17.9 ppg, 12.1 rpg, 2.9 apg, 1.9 spg, 55.1 FG%, 36.6 3P%, 591 points

Second Team All-America:

- Alonzo Mourning, Georgetown, Key Stats: 16.5 ppg, 8.5 rpg, 2.2 bpg, 52.5 FG%, 510 points

AP Honorable Mention

- Boo Harvey, St. John's
- Nadav Henefeld, Connecticut
- Dikembe Mutombo, Georgetown
- Billy Owens, Syracuse
- Chris Smith, Connecticut
- Mark Tillmon, Georgetown
- Stephen Thompson, Syracuse

== See also ==
- 1989–90 NCAA Division I men's basketball season
- 1989–90 Connecticut Huskies men's basketball team
- 1989–90 Georgetown Hoyas men's basketball team
- 1989–90 Pittsburgh Panthers men's basketball team
- 1989–90 Providence Friars men's basketball team
- 1989–90 St. John's Redmen basketball team
- 1989–90 Villanova Wildcats men's basketball team
- 1989–90 Syracuse Orangemen basketball team
