= 1989–90 Syracuse Orangemen basketball team =

American college basketball season

1989–90 Syracuse Orangemen basketball

Big East Regular season co-champions

NCAA tournament, Sweet Sixteen
- Conference: Big East Conference

Ranking
- Coaches: No. 6
- AP: No. 6
- Record: 26–7 (12–4 Big East)
- Head coach: Jim Boeheim (14th season)
- Assistant coaches: Bernie Fine (14th season); Wayne Morgan (6th season)
- Home arena: Carrier Dome

1989–90 Big East men's basketball standings
| | Conf. | | | | Overall |
| Team | W | | L | PCT | W | | L | PCT |
|---|---|---|---|---|---|---|---|---|
| No. 4 Connecticut† | 12 | – | 4 | .750 | 31 | – | 6 | .838 |
| No. 6 Syracuse | 12 | – | 4 | .750 | 26 | – | 7 | .788 |
| No. 8 Georgetown | 11 | – | 5 | .688 | 24 | – | 7 | .774 |
| St. John's | 10 | – | 6 | .625 | 24 | – | 10 | .706 |
| Villanova | 8 | – | 8 | .500 | 18 | – | 15 | .545 |
| Providence | 8 | – | 8 | .500 | 17 | – | 12 | .586 |
| Seton Hall | 5 | – | 11 | .313 | 12 | – | 16 | .429 |
| Pittsburgh | 5 | – | 11 | .313 | 12 | – | 17 | .414 |
| Boston College | 1 | – | 15 | .063 | 8 | – | 20 | .286 |
† 1990 Big East tournament winner As of April 2, 1990; Rankings from AP Poll

The 1989–90 Syracuse Orangemen basketball team represented Syracuse University in the 1989–90 NCAA Division I men's basketball season. The head coach was Jim Boeheim, serving for his 14th year. The team played home games at the Carrier Dome in Syracuse, New York. The team finished with a 26–7 (12–4) record, was Big East regular season champions, and advanced to the Southeast Regional semifinal of the NCAA tournament.

The team was led by Big East Player of the Year Derrick Coleman and sophomore Billy Owens.

== Roster ==
1989–90 Syracuse Orange men's basketball team
Players
Coaches

| Pos. | # | Name | Height | Weight | Year | Hometown |
|---|---|---|---|---|---|---|
| SF | 4 | Dave Johnson | 6 ft 7 in (2.01 m) | 200 lb (91 kg) | So | Morgan City, Louisiana |
| PF | 13 | Conrad McRae | 6 ft 10 in (2.08 m) | 215 lb (98 kg) | Fr | Brooklyn, New York |
| G | 21 | Matt Roe | 6 ft 5 in (1.96 m) | 175 lb (79 kg) | Sr | Manlius, New York |
| PF | 25 | LeRon Ellis | 6 ft 9 in (2.06 m) | 215 lb (98 kg) | Jr | Los Angeles, California |
| SF | 30 | Billy Owens | 6 ft 8 in (2.03 m) | 205 lb (93 kg) | So | Carlisle, Pennsylvania |
| G | 32 | Stephen Thompson | 6 ft 4 in (1.93 m) | 175 lb (79 kg) | Sr | Los Angeles, California |
| G | 33 | Mike Hopkins | 6 ft 5 in (1.96 m) | — | Fr | San Mateo, California |
| C | 34 | Rich Manning | 6 ft 11 in (2.11 m) | 240 lb (109 kg) | So | Tacoma, Washington |
| C | 41 | Erik Rogers | 6 ft 10 in (2.08 m) | 205 lb (93 kg) | Sr | Temple City, California |
| F | 44 | Derrick Coleman | 6 ft 9 in (2.06 m) | 215 lb (98 kg) | Sr | Detroit, Michigan |

Head coach

- Jim Boeheim (Syracuse)

Assistant coach(es)

- Bernie Fine (Syracuse)
- Wayne Morgan (St. Lawrence)

Legend

- (C) Team captain
- (S) Suspended
- (I) Ineligible
- (W) Walk-on
- Injured
- Current redshirt

Roster
Last update: 2020-Jan-25

== Schedule and results ==
| Date time, TV | Rank^{#} | Opponent^{#} | Result | Record | Site city, state |
|---|---|---|---|---|---|
| Nov 27, 1989* | No. 1 | Rutgers | W 95–79 | 1–0 | Carrier Dome; Syracuse, NY |
| Nov 29, 1989* | No. 1 | Cornell | W 108–56 | 2–0 | Carrier Dome; Syracuse, NY |
| Dec 1, 1989* | No. 1 | VCU; Carrier Classic | W 100–73 | 3–0 | Carrier Dome; Syracuse, NY |
| Dec 2, 1989* | No. 1 | No. 16 Temple; Carrier Classic | W 73–56 | 4–0 | Carrier Dome; Syracuse, NY |
| Dec 6, 1989* | No. 1 | vs. No. 6 Duke; ACC–Big East Challenge | W 78–76 | 5–0 | Greensboro Coliseum; Greensboro, NC |
| Dec 9, 1989* | No. 1 | at Canisius | W 92–72 | 6–0 | Buffalo Memorial Auditorium; Buffalo, NY |
| Dec 16, 1989* | No. 1 | Towson State | W 105–75 | 7–0 | Carrier Dome; Syracuse, NY |
| Dec 19, 1989* | No. 1 | C. W. Post | W 129–72 | 8–0 | Carrier Dome; Syracuse, NY |
| Dec 28, 1989* | No. 1 | Lafayette | W 85–64 | 9–0 | Carrier Dome; Syracuse, NY |
| Jan 3, 1990 | No. 1 | at Pittsburgh | W 80–78 | 10–0 (1–0) | Civic Arena; Pittsburgh, PA |
| Jan 6, 1990 | No. 1 | Villanova | L 74–93 | 10–1 (1–1) | Carrier Dome; Syracuse, NY |
| Jan 10, 1990 | No. 6 | No. 15 St. John's | W 81–72 | 11–1 (2–1) | Carrier Dome; Syracuse, NY |
| Jan 13, 1990 | No. 6 | at Boston College | W 81–66 | 12–1 (3–1) | Silvio O. Conte Forum; Chestnut Hill, MA |
| Jan 15, 1990 | No. 6 | at Connecticut; Rivalry | L 59–70 | 12–2 (3–2) | Hartford Civic Center (16,294); Hartford, CT |
| Jan 20, 1990 | No. 5 | Providence | L 86–87 | 12–3 (3–3) | Carrier Dome; Syracuse, NY |
| Jan 23, 1990 | No. 11 | Pittsburgh | W 83–74 | 13–3 (4–3) | Carrier Dome; Syracuse, NY |
| Jan 27, 1990 | No. 11 | at No. 3 Georgetown; Rivalry | W 95–76 | 14–3 (5–3) | Capital Centre; Landover, MD |
| Jan 29, 1990 | No. 11 | at No. 15 St. John's | W 70–65 | 15–3 (6–3) | Madison Square Garden; New York, NY |
| Feb 3, 1990* | No. 7 | vs. Florida State | W 90–69 | 16–3 | Orlando Arena; Orlando, FL |
| Feb 5, 1990 | No. 7 | Seton Hall | W 74–65 | 17–3 (7–3) | Carrier Dome; Syracuse, NY |
| Feb 10, 1990 | No. 6 | No. 8 Connecticut; Rivalry | W 90–86 | 18–3 (8–3) | Carrier Dome (32,820); Syracuse, NY |
| Feb 12, 1990 | No. 6 | at Villanova | L 56–60 | 18–4 (8–4) | The Spectrum; Philadelphia, PA |
| Feb 17, 1990* | No. 4 | Notre Dame | L 65–66 | 18–5 | Carrier Dome; Syracuse, NY |
| Feb 20, 1990 | No. 11 | Boston College | W 105–69 | 19–5 (9–4) | Carrier Dome; Syracuse, NY |
| Feb 25, 1990 | No. 11 | at Providence | W 93–89 | 20–5 (10–4) | Providence Civic Center; Providence, RI |
| Feb 28, 1990 | No. 10 | at Seton Hall | W 71–69 | 21–5 (11–4) | Brendan Byrne Arena; East Rutherford, NJ |
| Mar 4, 1990 | No. 10 | No. 7 Georgetown; Rivalry | W 89–87 | 22–5 (12–4) | Carrier Dome; Syracuse, NY |
Big East tournament
| Mar 9, 1990 | No. 4 | vs. Pittsburgh; Big East tournament quarterfinal | W 58–55 | 23–5 | Madison Square Garden; New York, NY |
| Mar 10, 1990 | No. 4 | vs. Villanova; Big East tournament semifinal | W 73–61 | 24–5 | Madison Square Garden; New York, NY |
| Mar 11, 1990 | No. 4 | vs. No. 8 Connecticut; Big East tournament championship / Rivalry | L 75–78 | 24–6 | Madison Square Garden; New York, NY |
NCAA tournament
| Mar 16, 1990*; CBS | (2 SE) No. 6 | vs. (15 SE) Coppin State; First round | W 70–48 | 25–6 | Richmond Coliseum; Richmond, VA |
| Mar 18, 1990*; CBS | (2 SE) No. 6 | vs. (7 SE) Virginia; Second Round | W 63–61 | 26–6 | Richmond Coliseum; Richmond, VA |
| Mar 23, 1990*; CBS | (2 SE) No. 6 | vs. (6 SE) No. 20 Minnesota; Southeast Regional semifinal | L 75–82 | 26–7 | Louisiana Superdome; New Orleans, LA |
*Non-conference game. ^{#}Rankings from AP. (#) Tournament seedings in parentheses. SE=Southeast. All times are in EST.

== Rankings ==
Ranking movements Legend: ██ Increase in ranking ██ Decrease in ranking
| | Week | | | | | | | | | | | | | | | | |
| Poll | Pre | 1 | 2 | 3 | 4 | 5 | 6 | 7 | 8 | 9 | 10 | 11 | 12 | 13 | 14 | 15 | Final |
|---|---|---|---|---|---|---|---|---|---|---|---|---|---|---|---|---|---|
| AP | 3 | 1 | 1 | 1 | 1 | 1 | 1 | 6 | 5 | 11 | 7 | 6 | 4 | 11 | 10 | 4 | 6 |
| Coaches | 2 | 1 | 1 | 1 | 1 | 1 | 1 | 6 | 5 | 10 | 7 | 6 | 3 | 9 | 9 | 4 | 6 |

== Awards and honors ==
- Derrick Coleman – Big East Player of the Year

== 1990 NBA draft ==
| Round | Pick | Player | NBA club |
|---|---|---|---|
| 1 | 1 | Derrick Coleman | New Jersey Nets |
