= 1990 Big East men's basketball tournament =

- Classification: Division I
- Season: 1989–90
- Teams: 9
- Site: Madison Square Garden; New York City
- Champions: Connecticut (1st title)
- Winning coach: Jim Calhoun (1st title)
- MVP: Chris Smith (Connecticut)

1989–90 Big East men's basketball standings
	Conf.				Overall
Team	W		L	PCT	W		L	PCT
No. 4 Connecticut†	12	–	4	.750	31	–	6	.838
No. 6 Syracuse	12	–	4	.750	26	–	7	.788
No. 8 Georgetown	11	–	5	.688	24	–	7	.774
St. John's	10	–	6	.625	24	–	10	.706
Villanova	8	–	8	.500	18	–	15	.545
Providence	8	–	8	.500	17	–	12	.586
Seton Hall	5	–	11	.313	12	–	16	.429
Pittsburgh	5	–	11	.313	12	–	17	.414
Boston College	1	–	15	.063	8	–	20	.286
† 1990 Big East tournament winner As of April 2, 1990; Rankings from AP Poll

The 1990 Big East men's basketball tournament took place at Madison Square Garden in New York City, from March 8 to March 11, 1990. Its winner received the Big East Conference's automatic bid to the 1990 NCAA tournament. It is a single-elimination tournament with four rounds. Syracuse and Connecticut tied for the best regular-season conference record. Based on tie-breakers, Syracuse was awarded the #1 seed.

Connecticut defeated Syracuse in the championship game 78–75, to claim its first Big East tournament championship.

== Bracket ==
First round March 8, 1990
8	Pittsburgh	88
9	Boston College	70

Quarterfinals; March 9, 1990
1	#4 Syracuse	58
8	Pittsburgh	55
4	St. John's	60
5	Villanova	70
3	#5 Georgetown	78
6	Providence	77
2	#8 Connecticut	76
7	Seton Hall	58

Semifinals; March 10, 1990
1	#4 Syracuse	73
5	Villanova	61
3	#5 Georgetown	60
2	#8 Connecticut	65

Championship Game; March 11, 1990
1	#4 Syracuse	75
2	#8 Connecticut	78

== Awards ==
Dave Gavitt Trophy (Most Valuable Player): Chris Smith, Connecticut

All-Tournament Team

- Derrick Coleman, Syracuse
- Tate George, Connecticut
- Tom Greis, Villanova
- John Gwynn, Connecticut
- Chris Smith, Connecticut
- Stephen Thompson, Syracuse
