= Steve Hood =

American basketball player

Personal information
- Born: April 4, 1968 (age 58) Lynchburg, Virginia, U.S.
- Listed height: 6 ft 7 in (2.01 m)
- Listed weight: 185 lb (84 kg)

Career information
- High school: DeMatha Catholic (Hyattsville, Maryland)
- College: Maryland (1987–1988); James Madison (1989–1991)
- NBA draft: 1991: 2nd round, 42nd overall pick
- Drafted by: Sacramento Kings
- Playing career: 1991–2001
- Position: Shooting guard

Career history
- 1991: Rockford Lightning
- 1992: Canberra Cannons
- 1993–1994: Peñas Huesca
- 1994–1995: Shreveport Crawdads
- 1995: JDA Dijon Basket
- 1995: Shreveport Storm
- 1995–1996: Fort Wayne Fury
- 1996: Ampelokipoi B.C.
- 1996–1997: NKK Sea Hawks
- 1997–1998: Hapoel Holon
- 1998–1999: Maccabi Haifa
- 1999–2000: Ironi Ramat Gan
- 2000–2001: CB Granada

Career highlights
- 2× CAA Player of the Year (1990, 1991); 2× First-team All-CAA (1990, 1991); McDonald's All-American (1986)
- Stats at Basketball Reference

Steven Lamarr Hood (born April 4, 1968) is an American former professional basketball player born in Lynchburg, Virginia. In high school Hood starred for DeMatha Catholic High School in Hyattsville, Maryland, from 1983 to 1986 and was selected as a 1986 McDonald's All-American. He then received an athletic scholarship to play for the Maryland Terrapins men's basketball team. After two seasons, Hood transferred to James Madison University (JMU) to play for coach Lefty Driesell, who recruited Hood from high school. Driesell was the coach at Maryland when he recruited Hood but left the summer before Hood went to play at UMD.

After sitting out for one season upon the transfer per NCAA rules, Hood became one of the most feared players in the Colonial Athletic Association (CAA). He started all 60 games for the Dukes and in both seasons with them was named the Colonial Athletic Association Men's Basketball Player of the Year both seasons.

Hood was selected in the second round of the 1991 NBA draft by the Sacramento Kings (42nd overall). Hood played for several teams overseas in Europe in his pro career.
