= 1989–90 Providence Friars men's basketball team =

American college basketball season

1989–90 Providence Friars men's basketball

NCAA tournament, First Round
- Conference: Big East Conference
- Record: 17–12 (8–8 Big East)
- Head coach: Rick Barnes (2nd season)
- Home arena: Providence Civic Center

1989–90 Big East men's basketball standings
	Conf.				Overall
Team	W		L	PCT	W		L	PCT
No. 4 Connecticut†	12	–	4	.750	31	–	6	.838
No. 6 Syracuse	12	–	4	.750	26	–	7	.788
No. 8 Georgetown	11	–	5	.688	24	–	7	.774
St. John's	10	–	6	.625	24	–	10	.706
Villanova	8	–	8	.500	18	–	15	.545
Providence	8	–	8	.500	17	–	12	.586
Seton Hall	5	–	11	.313	12	–	16	.429
Pittsburgh	5	–	11	.313	12	–	17	.414
Boston College	1	–	15	.063	8	–	20	.286
† 1990 Big East tournament winner As of April 2, 1990; Rankings from AP Poll

The 1989–90 Providence Friars men's basketball team represented Providence College during the 1989–90 NCAA Division I men's basketball season. Led by second-year head coach Rick Barnes, the Friars finished the season 17–12 (8–8 Big East) and received an at-large bid to the NCAA tournament as the 9 seed in the West region.

== Roster ==
1989–90 Providence Friars men's basketball team
Players
Coaches

Pos.	#	Name	Height	Weight	Year	Hometown
G	14	Eric Murdock	6 ft 1 in (1.85 m)	175 lb (79 kg)	Jr	Bridgewater Township, New Jersey
G	20	Carlton Screen	6 ft 0 in (1.83 m)	158 lb (72 kg)	Sr	Brooklyn, New York
F	24	Marques Bragg	6 ft 8 in (2.03 m)	220 lb (100 kg)	So	East Orange, New Jersey
F	25	Abdul Shamsid-Deen	6 ft 10 in (2.08 m)	209 lb (95 kg)	Sr	Staten Island, New York
C	30	Marty Conlon	6 ft 10 in (2.08 m)	209 lb (95 kg)	Sr	Bronxville, New York

Head coach

- Rick Barnes (Lenoir–Rhyne)

Assistant coach(es)

Legend

- (C) Team captain
- (S) Suspended
- (I) Ineligible
- (W) Walk-on
- Injured
- Current redshirt

== Schedule and results ==
Date time, TV	Rank^{#}	Opponent^{#}	Result	Record	Site city, state
Regular Season
Nov 24, 1989*		New Hampshire	W 70–49	1–0	Providence Civic Center; Providence, Rhode Island
Mar 3, 1990		Pittsburgh	W 85–74	17–10 (8–8)	Providence Civic Center; Providence, Rhode Island
Big East Tournament
Mar 9, 1990*		vs. No. 5 Georgetown; Big East Tournament Quarterfinal	L 77–78	17–11	Madison Square Garden; New York, New York
NCAA Tournament
Mar 15, 1990*	(9 W)	vs. (8 W) Ohio State; First Round	L 83–84 ^{OT}	17–12	Jon M. Huntsman Center; Salt Lake City, Utah
*Non-conference game. ^{#}Rankings from AP Poll. (#) Tournament seedings in parentheses. W=West. All times are in Eastern Time.

== NBA draft ==
Round	Pick	Player	NBA club
2	53	Abdul Shamsid-Deen	Seattle SuperSonics
