= 1989–90 Temple Owls men's basketball team =

American college basketball season

1989–90 Temple Owls men's basketball

A–10 Regular Season Champions A–10 tournament champions

NCAA tournament
- Conference: Atlantic 10 Conference
- Record: 20–11 (15–3 A–10)
- Head coach: John Chaney (8th season)
- Home arena: McGonigle Hall (Capacity: 4,500)

1989–90 Atlantic 10 men's basketball standings
	Conf.				Overall
Team	W		L	PCT	W		L	PCT
Temple †	15	–	3	.833	20	–	11	.645
Penn State	13	–	5	.722	25	–	9	.735
West Virginia	11	–	7	.611	16	–	12	.571
Rhode Island	11	–	7	.611	15	–	13	.536
Rutgers	11	–	7	.611	18	–	17	.514
UMass	10	–	8	.556	17	–	14	.548
George Washington	6	–	12	.333	14	–	17	.452
Saint Joseph's	5	–	13	.278	7	–	21	.250
Duquesne	5	–	13	.278	7	–	22	.241
St. Bonaventure	3	–	15	.167	8	–	20	.286
† 1990 Atlantic 10 Tournament winner Rankings from AP Poll

The 1989–90 Temple Owls men's basketball team represented Temple University as a member of the Atlantic 10 Conference during the 1989–90 NCAA Division I men's basketball season. The team was led by head coach John Chaney and played their home games at McGonigle Hall. The Owls won A-10 regular season and conference tournament titles. They received an automatic bid to the NCAA tournament as No. 11 seed in the East region. Temple was beaten by St. John's in the opening round to finish with a record of 20–11 (15–3 A-10).

== Roster ==
1989–90 Temple Owls men's basketball team
Players
Coaches

Pos.	#	Name	Height	Weight	Year	Previous school	Hometown
G	12	Mark Macon	6 ft 4 in (1.93 m)	185 lb (84 kg)	Jr	Buena Vista HS	Saginaw, MI
F	24	Mik Kilgore	6 ft 8 in (2.03 m)	210 lb (95 kg)	So	West Philadelphia HS	Philadelphia, PA
F	30	Mark Strickland	6 ft 9 in (2.06 m)	205 lb (93 kg)	Fr	McNair HS	Atlanta, GA
F/C	35	Donald Hodge	7 ft 0 in (2.13 m)	225 lb (102 kg)	So	Calvin Coolidge HS	Washington, D.C.
C	45	Duane Causwell	7 ft 0 in (2.13 m)	240 lb (109 kg)	Sr	Benjamin N. Cardozo HS	Queens, NY

Head coach

- John Chaney

Assistant coach(es)

Legend

- (C) Team captain
- (S) Suspended
- (I) Ineligible
- (W) Walk-on
- Injured
- Current redshirt

Roster

== Schedule ==
Date time, TV	Rank^{#}	Opponent^{#}	Result	Record	Site city, state
Regular season
Nov 28, 1989*	No. 16	at Penn	W 55–54	1–0	Palestra; Philadelphia, Pennsylvania
Dec 1, 1989*	No. 16	vs. Arkansas State; Carrier Classic	W 65–41	2–0	Carrier Dome; Syracuse, New York
Dec 2, 1989*	No. 16	at No. 1 Syracuse; Carrier Classic	L 56–73	2–1	Carrier Dome; Syracuse, New York
Dec 9, 1989	No. 23	at Penn State	L 59–61	2–2 (0–1)	Rec Hall; University Park, Pennsylvania
Dec 12, 1989		Saint Joseph's	W 74–54	3–2 (1–1)	McGonigle Hall; Philadelphia, Pennsylvania
Dec 16, 1989*		at No. 5 Illinois	L 61–78	3–3	Assembly Hall; Champaign, Illinois
Dec 23, 1989		Duquesne	W 93–62	4–3 (2–1)	McGonigle Hall; Philadelphia, Pennsylvania
Jan 4, 1990*		No. 17 La Salle	L 62–63	4–4	McGonigle Hall; Philadelphia, Pennsylvania
Jan 6, 1990*		vs. No. 18 NC State	L 71–74	4–5	Atlantic City, New Jersey
Jan 9, 1990		at George Washington	W 60–57	5–5 (3–1)	Charles E. Smith Center; Washington, D.C.
Jan 11, 1990*		West Virginia	W 73–69	6–5 (4–1)	McGonigle Hall; Philadelphia, Pennsylvania
Jan 13, 1990*		No. 7 UNLV	L 76–82	6–6	The Spectrum; Philadelphia, Pennsylvania
Jan 16, 1990*		at No. 11 Georgia Tech	L 57–59	6–7	Alexander Memorial Coliseum; Atlanta, Georgia
Jan 18, 1990		at Duquesne	W 67–43	7–7 (5–1)	A.J. Palumbo Center; Pittsburgh, Pennsylvania
Jan 20, 1990		UMass	W 86–69	8–7 (6–1)	McGonigle Hall; Philadelphia, Pennsylvania
Jan 24, 1990		Rhode Island	W 81–70	9–7 (7–1)	McGonigle Hall; Philadelphia, Pennsylvania
Jan 28, 1990		at St. Bonaventure	W 59–46	10–7 (8–1)	Reilly Center; St. Bonaventure, New York
Jan 31, 1990		at Saint Joseph's	W 78–63	11–7 (9–1)	Hagan Arena; Philadelphia, Pennsylvania
Feb 3, 1990		at Rhode Island	L 70–86	11–8 (9–2)	Keaney Gymnasium; Kingston, Rhode Island
Feb 5, 1990		St. Bonaventure	W 81–64	12–8 (10–2)	McGonigle Hall; Philadelphia, Pennsylvania
Feb 11, 1990		at UMass	W 83–82 ^{3 OT}	13–8 (11–2)	Curry Hicks Cage; Amherst, Massachusetts
Feb 13, 1990		Penn State	W 61–53	14–8 (12–2)	McGonigle Hall; Philadelphia, Pennsylvania
Feb 18, 1990		at Rutgers	W 75–69	15–8 (13–2)	Louis Brown Athletic Center; Piscataway, New Jersey
Feb 21, 1990*		Villanova	L 69–71	15–9	McGonigle Hall; Philadelphia, Pennsylvania
Feb 24, 1990		George Washington	W 86–74	16–9 (14–2)	McGonigle Hall; Philadelphia, Pennsylvania
Feb 27, 1990		at West Virginia	L 51–55	16–10 (14–3)	WVU Coliseum; Morgantown, West Virginia
Mar 1, 1990		Rutgers	W 75–70 ^{2 OT}	17–10 (15–3)	McGonigle Hall; Philadelphia, Pennsylvania
Atlantic 10 Tournament
Mar 4, 1990*		Duquesne; A-10 Tournament Quarterfinal	W 61–50	18–10	The Palestra; Philadelphia, Pennsylvania
Mar 5, 1990*		Rutgers; A-10 Tournament Semifinal	W 65–57	19–10	Palestra; Philadelphia, Pennsylvania
Mar 8, 1990*		UMass; A-10 tournament championship	W 53–51	20–10	McGonigle Hall; Philadelphia, Pennsylvania
NCAA Tournament
Mar 16, 1990*	(11 E)	vs. (6 E) St. John's	L 65–81	20–11	Omni Coliseum; Atlanta, Georgia
*Non-conference game. ^{#}Rankings from AP Poll. (#) Tournament seedings in parentheses. E=East. All times are in Eastern Standard Time.

== NBA draft ==
Round	Pick	Player	NBA club
1	18	Duane Causwell	Sacramento Kings
