= 1986 McDonald's All-American Boys Game =

American high school basketball game

| East | West |
|---|---|
| 104 | 101 |
| | 1st half | 2nd half | Total |
|---|---|---|---|
| East | 43 | 61 | 104 |
| West | 52 | 49 | 101 |
- Date: April 11, 1986
- Venue: Joe Louis Arena, Detroit, MI
- MVP: J. R. Reid
- Referees: 1; 2; 3
- Attendance: 15,527
- Network: ESPN
- Announcers: Jim Thacker and Dick Vitale

McDonald's All-American

The 1986 McDonald's All-American Boys Game was an All-star basketball game played on Sunday, April 11, 1986, at the Joe Louis Arena in Detroit, Michigan. The game's rosters featured the best and most highly recruited high school boys graduating in 1986. The game was the 9th annual version of the McDonald's All-American Game first played in 1978.

== 1986 game ==
The game was telecast by ESPN. The East team had many of the top ranked forwards of the 1986 class, including J. R. Reid, who went on to win Mr. Basketball USA; the West team relied on forwards Nick Anderson, Derrick Coleman and Terry Mills, and center Dwayne Schintzius. The protagonists of the 1986 game were East players Rumeal Robinson, a guard who scored 19 points, Steve Hood (16 points) and Reid who won the MVP award (23 points, 8 rebounds); for the West, Derrick Coleman recorded 19 points and 15 rebounds, while Mills scored 20 points along with 5 rebounds. Schintzius and Randall scored 15 points each; Schintzius also had 5 blocks. Of the 25 players, 13 went on to play at least 1 game in the NBA.

=== East roster ===
| No. | Name | Height | Weight | Position | Hometown | High school | College of Choice |
|---|---|---|---|---|---|---|---|
| 3 | Rex Chapman | 6-4 | 180 | G | Owensboro, KY, U.S. | Apollo | Kentucky |
| 10 | Rumeal Robinson | 6-2 | 185 | G | Cambridge, MA, U.S. | Rindge and Latin | Michigan |
| 20 | Mark Tillmon | 6-1 | 185 | G | Washington, D.C., U.S. | Gonzaga | Georgetown |
| 23 | Chris Brooks | 6-6 | 205 | F | Mouth of Wilson, VA, U.S. | Oak Hill Academy | West Virginia |
| 25 | Ricky Jones | 6-6 | 190 | F | Pendleton, SC, U.S. | Pendleton | Clemson |
| 31 | Brian Oliver | 6-4 | 185 | G | Smyrna, GA, U.S. | Wills | Georgia Tech |
| 32 | Pete Chilcutt | 6-8 1/2 | 220 | F | Tuscaloosa, AL, U.S. | Tuscaloosa Academy | North Carolina |
| 33 | Alaa Abdelnaby | 6-10 | 215 | F / C | Bloomfield, NJ, U.S. | Bloomfield | Duke |
| 34 | J. R. Reid | 6-10 | 240 | F / C | Virginia Beach, VA, U.S. | Kempsville | North Carolina |
| 35 | Barry Bekkedam | 6-10 | 200 | F | Radnor, PA, U.S. | Archbishop Carroll | Villanova |
| 40 | Larry Rembert | 6-8 | 220 | F | Orrville, AL, U.S. | Keith | UAB |
| 44 | Steve Hood | 6-6 | 190 | F | Hyattsville, MD, U.S. | DeMatha | Maryland |
| 50 | Keith Robinson | 6-8 | 205 | F | Buffalo, NY, U.S. | Grover Cleveland | Notre Dame |

=== West roster ===
| No. | Name | Height | Weight | Position | Hometown | High school | College of Choice |
|---|---|---|---|---|---|---|---|
| 4 | Fess Irvin | 5-11 | 170 | G | Gonzales, LA, U.S. | East Ascension | LSU |
| 22 | Dwayne Bryant | 6-2 | 180 | G | New Orleans, LA, U.S. | De La Salle | Georgetown |
| 24 | Anthony Pendleton | 6-4 | 175 | G | Flint, MI, U.S. | Northwestern | Iowa |
| 32 | Stephen Thompson | 6-3 | 170 | G | Los Angeles, CA, U.S. | Crenshaw | Syracuse |
| 33 | Dwayne Schintzius | 7-1 | 225 | C | Brandon, FL, U.S. | Brandon | Florida |
| 34 | Ron Huery | 6-6 | 187 | G / F | Memphis, TN, U.S. | Whitehaven | Arkansas |
| 42 | Mark Randall | 6-8 | 190 | F | Englewood, CO, U.S. | Cherry Creek | Kansas |
| 43 | Derrick Coleman | 6-9 | 215 | F | Detroit, MI, U.S. | Northern | Syracuse |
| 44 | Nelison Anderson | 6-5 | 210 | F | Chicago, IL, U.S. | Simeon | Illinois |
| 45 | Phil Henderson | 6-4 | 165 | G | Crete, IL, U.S. | Crete-Monee | Duke |
| 52 | Terry Mills | 6-10 | 207 | F | Romulus, MI, U.S. | Romulus | Michigan |
| 54 | Scott Williams | 6-10 | 215 | C | Hacienda Heights, CA, U.S. | Glen A. Wilson | North Carolina |

=== Coaches ===
The East team was coached by:

- Head Coach Stewart Vetter Jr. of Flint Hill School (Oakton, Virginia)

The West team was coached by:

- Head Coach J. E. Evans of Keith High School (Orrville, Alabama)
