= 1990 Atlantic 10 men's basketball tournament =

- Classification: Division I
- Season: 1989–90
- Teams: 10
- Site: The Palestra; Philadelphia and McGonigle Hall; Philadelphia
- Champions: Temple (4th title)
- Winning coach: John Chaney (4th title)
- MVP: Mark Macon (Temple)

1989–90 Atlantic 10 men's basketball standings
	Conf.				Overall
Team	W		L	PCT	W		L	PCT
Temple †	15	–	3	.833	20	–	11	.645
Penn State	13	–	5	.722	25	–	9	.735
West Virginia	11	–	7	.611	16	–	12	.571
Rhode Island	11	–	7	.611	15	–	13	.536
Rutgers	11	–	7	.611	18	–	17	.514
UMass	10	–	8	.556	17	–	14	.548
George Washington	6	–	12	.333	14	–	17	.452
Saint Joseph's	5	–	13	.278	7	–	21	.250
Duquesne	5	–	13	.278	7	–	22	.241
St. Bonaventure	3	–	15	.167	8	–	20	.286
† 1990 Atlantic 10 Tournament winner Rankings from AP Poll

The 1990 Atlantic 10 men's basketball tournament was held as the conclusion to the 1989-90 Atlantic 10 Conference collegiate men's basketball season.

First Round, Quarterfinals, and Semifinals were held on consecutive days from March 3 to March 5, 1990, at the Palestra in Philadelphia, Pennsylvania.

Finals were held on March 8, 1990, at McGonigle Hall in Philadelphia, in which the Temple Owls beat the Massachusetts Minutemen by a two point margin to win the Tournament on home ground.

Temple was the only team to receive an automatic bid to the 1990 NCAA Men's Division I Basketball Tournament. The top six teams in the conference received first-round byes.

== Bracket ==
First round March 3 Palestra, Philadelphia, PA
8	Saint Joseph's	70
9	Duquesne	96
7	George Washington	85
10	St. Bonaventure	77

Quarterfinals; March 4 Palestra
1	Temple	61
9	Duquesne	50
4	Rhode Island	79
5	Rutgers	80
2	Penn State	83
7	George Washington	72
3	West Virginia	55
6	UMass	78

Semifinals; March 5 Palestra
1	Temple	65
5	Rutgers	57
2	Penn State	59
6	UMass	64

Final; March 8 McGonigle Hall, Philadelphia
1	Temple	53
6	UMass	51

== Trivia ==
Although Tournament champions and overall season champions are awarded separately, in the 1989-90 season the Temple Owls won both.

The Atlantic 10 Conference tournament finals have only ever been won by a margin of two points one other time, when the Saint Louis Billikens beat the St. Bonaventure Bonnies in 2019.
