= 1989–90 Connecticut Huskies men's basketball team =

American college basketball season

1989–90 Connecticut Huskies men's basketball

Big East tournament champions Big East Regular Season Co-Champions

NCAA Division I men's tournament, Elite Eight
- Conference: Big East Conference

Ranking
- Coaches: No. 3
- AP: No. 4
- Record: 31–6 (12–4 Big East)
- Head coach: Jim Calhoun (4th season)
- Assistant coaches: Howie Dickenman; Dave Leitao; Glen Miller; Scott Wissell
- Home arena: Hugh S. Greer Field House; Hartford Civic Center; Harry A. Gampel Pavilion

1989–90 Big East men's basketball standings
	Conf.				Overall
Team	W		L	PCT	W		L	PCT
No. 4 Connecticut†	12	–	4	.750	31	–	6	.838
No. 6 Syracuse	12	–	4	.750	26	–	7	.788
No. 8 Georgetown	11	–	5	.688	24	–	7	.774
St. John's	10	–	6	.625	24	–	10	.706
Villanova	8	–	8	.500	18	–	15	.545
Providence	8	–	8	.500	17	–	12	.586
Seton Hall	5	–	11	.313	12	–	16	.429
Pittsburgh	5	–	11	.313	12	–	17	.414
Boston College	1	–	15	.063	8	–	20	.286
† 1990 Big East tournament winner As of April 2, 1990; Rankings from AP Poll

The 1989–90 Connecticut Huskies men's basketball team represented the University of Connecticut in the 1989–90 collegiate men's basketball season. The Huskies completed the season with a 31–6 overall record. The Huskies were members of the Big East Conference where they finished with a 12–4 record. UConn made it to the Elite Eight in the 1990 NCAA Division I men's basketball tournament before losing to Duke 79–78 in overtime.

Many consider this season the one where UConn broke out and became a national power, consistently being at the top of the conference in the 1990s and winning their first of six National Titles in 1999. The Huskies played their home games at Hugh S. Greer Field House and Harry A. Gampel Pavilion in Storrs, Connecticut as well as the Hartford Civic Center in Hartford, Connecticut, and they were led by fourth-year head coach Jim Calhoun.

== Schedule ==
Date time, TV	Rank^{#}	Opponent^{#}	Result	Record	Site (attendance) city, state
Regular Season
11/24/1989*; WTNH		vs. Texas A&M; Great Alaska Shootout	L 81–92	0–1	Sullivan Arena (4,620); Anchorage, Alaska
11/26/1989*		vs. Auburn; Great Alaska Shootout	W 95–81	1–1	Sullivan Arena (3,202); Anchorage, Alaska
11/27/1989*; ESPN		vs. Florida State; Great Alaska Shootout	W 63–60	2–1	Sullivan Arena (3,179); Anchorage, Alaska
11/30/1989*; WTNH		Yale	W 76–50	3–1	Hugh S. Greer Field House (4,604); Storrs, Connecticut
12/2/1989*		Howard	W 78–59	4–1	Hugh S. Greer Field House (4,604); Storrs, Connecticut
12/4/1989*; ESPN		Maryland; ACC–Big East Challenge	W 87–65	5–1	Hartford Civic Center (10,174); Hartford, Connecticut
12/7/1989*		Hartford	W 79–54	6–1	Hartford Civic Center (13,102); Hartford, Connecticut
12/9/1989*		Maine	W 95–55	7–1	Hugh S. Greer Field House (4,604); Storrs, Connecticut
12/12/1989; ESPN		Villanova	L 57–64	7–2 (0–1)	Hartford Civic Center (14,947); Hartford, Connecticut
12/23/1989*		Southern Connecticut	W 100–37	8–2	Hugh S. Greer Field House (4,604); Storrs, Connecticut
12/29/1989*		St. Joseph's; Connecticut Mutual Classic	W 83–58	9–2	Hartford Civic Center (13,682); Hartford, Connecticut
12/30/1989*		Mississippi State; Connecticut Mutual Classic	W 84–68	10–2	Hartford Civic Center (14,115); Hartford, Connecticut
1/2/1990; WTNH		at No. 16 St. John's	L 62–93	10–3 (0–2)	Carnesecca Arena (6,008); New York City, New York
1/6/1990		Pittsburgh	W 79–61	11–3 (1–2)	Hartford Civic Center (16,294); Hartford, Connecticut
1/9/1990; WTNH		at Villanova	W 71–54	12–3 (2–2)	The Pavilion (6,500); Villanova, Pennsylvania
1/13/1990; WTNH		at Seton Hall	W 79–76	13–3 (3–2)	Brendan Byrne Arena (13,621); East Rutherford, New Jersey
1/15/1990; ESPN		No. 5 Syracuse; Rivalry	W 70–59	14–3 (4–2)	Hartford Civic Center (16,294); Hartford, Connecticut
1/20/1990; WTNH		No. 2 Georgetown; Rivalry	W 70–65	15–3 (5–2)	Hartford Civic Center (16,294); Hartford, Connecticut
1/24/1990*	No. 20	Central Connecticut	W 99–67	16–3	Hugh S. Greer Field House (4,604); Storrs, Connecticut
1/27/1990; WTNH	No. 20	No. 15 St. John's	W 72–58	17–3 (6–2)	Harry A. Gampel Pavilion (8,241); Storrs, Connecticut
1/30/1990*	No. 13	at Massachusetts	W 94–75	18–3	Curry Hicks Cage (4,024); Amherst, Massachusetts
2/3/1990; WTNH	No. 13	at Providence	W 92–77	19–3 (7–2)	Providence Civic Center (13,160); Providence, Rhode Island
2/6/1990*	No. 8	Fairfield	W 74–39	20–3	Harry A. Gampel Pavilion (8,148); Storrs, Connecticut
2/10/1990; WTNH	No. 8	at No. 6 Syracuse; Rivalry	L 86–90	20–4 (7–3)	Carrier Dome (32,820); Syracuse, New York
2/13/1990	No. 10	at Pittsburgh	W 80–77	21–4 (8–3)	Civic Arena (6,798); Pittsburgh, Pennsylvania
2/17/1990	No. 10	Boston College	W 89–67	22–4 (9–3)	Harry A. Gampel Pavilion (8,302); Storrs, Connecticut
2/19/1990; ESPN	No. 10	Providence	W 75–72 ^{OT}	23–4 (10–3)	Harry A. Gampel Pavilion (8,302); Storrs, Connecticut
2/24/1990; WTNH	No. 6	Seton Hall	W 79–57	24–4 (11–3)	Harry A. Gampel Pavilion (8,302); Storrs, Connecticut
2/28/1990	No. 4	at No. 7 Georgetown; Rivalry	L 64–84	24–5 (11–4)	Capital Centre (19,035); Landover, Maryland
3/3/1990; WTNH	No. 4	at Boston College	W 95–74	25–5 (12–4)	Conte Forum (8,604); Chestnut Hill, Massachusetts
Big East tournament
3/9/1990; WTNH	No. 8	vs. Seton Hall; Quarterfinals	W 76–58	26–5	Madison Square Garden (18,212); New York City, New York
3/10/1990; CBS	No. 8	vs. No. 5 Georgetown; Semifinals/Rivalry	W 65–60	27–5	Madison Square Garden (18,212); New York City, New York
3/11/1990; CBS	No. 8	vs. No. 4 Syracuse; Championship/Rivalry	W 78–75	28–5	Madison Square Garden (18,212); New York City, New York
NCAA tournament
3/15/1990*; CBS	No. 4 (1)	No. (16) Boston University; First Round	W 76–52	29–5	Hartford Civic Center (15,937); Hartford, Connecticut
3/17/1990*; CBS	No. 4 (1)	No. (9) California; Second Round	W 74–54	30–5	Hartford Civic Center (16,011); Hartford, Connecticut
3/22/1990*; CBS	No. 4 (1)	vs. No. 17 (5) Clemson; Sweet Sixteen	W 71–70	31–5	Brendan Byrne Arena (19,502); East Rutherford, New Jersey
3/24/1990*; CBS	No. 4 (1)	vs. No. 15 (3) Duke; Elite Eight	L 78–79	31–6	Brendan Byrne Arena (19,546); East Rutherford, New Jersey
*Non-conference game. ^{#}Rankings from AP Poll. (#) Tournament seedings in parentheses. All times are in Eastern Time.

Schedule Source:

== NBA draft ==
Round	Pick	Player	NBA club
1	22	Tate George	New Jersey Nets
