= Macomb County Mustangs =

IBL team in Center Line, Michigan, United States

The Macomb County Mustangs are an International Basketball League (2005-) team who plays in Center Line, Michigan.

Despite having three players in the top 25 scorers(Justin Hall 26.2 ppg, Frank Gjojac 21.0 ppg and Mike Manciel 20.8 ppg), and three all-stars (Hall, Gjojac and Cameron Nichols), the team was a dismal 4-16, seventh in the east. After the season, head coach Milton Douglas was replaced with former NBA player Terry Mills.

The Mustangs played 2005 home games at L'Anse Creuse North, but moved 2006 home games to St. Clement School in Center Line.

The team is a rarity among IBL teams in that they broadcast their games online.

== Related Links/Sources ==
- Team page on IBL website
- Official Website
