= 1989–90 Georgetown Hoyas men's basketball team =

American college basketball season

1989–90 Georgetown Hoyas men's basketball

NCAA tournament, second round
- Conference: Big East Conference

Ranking
- Coaches: No. 9
- AP: No. 8
- Record: 24–7 (11–5 Big East)
- Head coach: John Thompson (18th season)
- Assistant coaches: Craig Esherick (8th season); Mike Riley (8th season)
- Captains: Dwayne Bryant; Sam Jefferson; Mark Tillmon
- Home arena: Capital Centre

1989–90 Big East men's basketball standings
	Conf.				Overall
Team	W		L	PCT	W		L	PCT
No. 4 Connecticut†	12	–	4	.750	31	–	6	.838
No. 6 Syracuse	12	–	4	.750	26	–	7	.788
No. 8 Georgetown	11	–	5	.688	24	–	7	.774
St. John's	10	–	6	.625	24	–	10	.706
Villanova	8	–	8	.500	18	–	15	.545
Providence	8	–	8	.500	17	–	12	.586
Seton Hall	5	–	11	.313	12	–	16	.429
Pittsburgh	5	–	11	.313	12	–	17	.414
Boston College	1	–	15	.063	8	–	20	.286
† 1990 Big East tournament winner As of April 2, 1990; Rankings from AP Poll

The 1989–90 Georgetown Hoyas men's basketball team represented Georgetown University in the 1989–90 NCAA Division I college basketball season. John Thompson, coached them in his 18th season as head coach. They played their home games at the Capital Centre in Landover, Maryland. They were members of the Big East Conference and finished the season with a record of 24–7, 11–5 in Big East play. Their record earned them a bye in the first round of the 1990 Big East men's basketball tournament, and they advanced to the semifinals before losing to Connecticut. They were the No. 3 seed in the Midwest Region of the 1990 NCAA Division I men's basketball tournament – the 12th of 14 consecutive Georgetown NCAA tournament appearances – and advanced to the second round before losing to Midwest Region No. 6 seed Xavier. They were ranked No. 8 in the season's final Associated Press Poll and No. 6 in the final Coaches' Poll.

== Season recap ==
The team opened the season with 14 straight wins. The loss at Connecticut that broke the streak on January 20, 1990, was only the second Georgetown loss to the Huskies since 1981.

Sophomore center Alonzo Mourning, touted by many observers upon his arrival the previous season as "the next Patrick Ewing," built upon the great success he enjoyed during his freshman year. He started all 31 games this season, scoring in double figures in 30 of them and averaging 16.5 points per game despite an average of only 8.6 shots per game. He also averaged 8.5 rebounds a game for the year. Against Hawaii Pacific in the second game of the season, he shot 13-for-14 (92.9%) from the free-throw line, the beginning of a school-record-setting season in which he scored in double figures in free throws alone in ten different games and made 220 free throws (out of 281 attempts, a 78.3% effort) on the year as opposing defenses fouled him time and again in an attempt to stop him from scoring inside. In his best games of the year, he had 27 points and 11 rebounds against Virginia Tech, 26 points and 14 rebounds against DePaul, and 20 points and 12 rebounds against Connecticut.

Junior center Dikembe Mutombo, a reserve player the previous season while he became accustomed to the American college game, played in all 31 games this season and started alongside Mourning in 24 of them, and his average playing time increased from 11 to 26 minutes per game. He averaged 10.5 points and 10.7 rebounds per game for the year. He scored 10 rebounds and blocked 10 shots in the North Carolina game, scored 17 points and had 15 rebounds against Pittsburgh, and scored 22 points and had 18 rebounds against Villanova. In later games of the season, his scoring and rebounding performance increased as he averaged shot 68% from the field and averaged 15 points and 13 rebounds a game.

Although much national attention focused on Mourning and Mutombo, the star of the team arguably was senior guard Mark Tillmon. A starter in his freshman and sophomore years, he had slumped during his junior season and been relegated to the bench. This year, he returned to form, starting all 31 games. In December 1989, he scored 27 points against North Carolina and 29 against Virginia Tech. During the five-game stretch from the victory over Northern Iowa on December 29, 1989, through the defeat of DePaul on January 13, 1990, he averaged 26 points a game, including a career-high 39 points against Providence. As the season wore on, he had 26 points at Villanova, 25 versus Seton Hall, and 20 at St. John's. In the rematch at Providence in February, he tied the career-high 39-point performance he had set against them a month and a half earlier, including connecting on a Georgetown-record seven three-point shots – a record destined to be matched only once over the next 18 years. He scored in double figures in 10 of his final 11 games.

Back from touring with a Big East all-star team during the summer of 1989, senior guard Dwayne Bryant returned as a team co-captain this season and started all 31 games. With freshman David Edwards playing point guard, Bryant was free to play shooting guard, and he responded with the best offensive season of his collegiate career. He scored in double figures in 21 games, and in the later games of the season averaged 16 points per game, including a 20-point effort against Connecticut and nine rebounds and a career-high 25 points against Syracuse consecutively in the last two games of the regular season. For the year, he averaged a career-best 12.3 points per game.

The season finale in which Bryant had his career-high scoring performance at the Carrier Dome before 33,015 against archrival Syracuse – the largest on-campus crowd in NCAA basketball history – was a wild game. Thompson was ejected – only his third ejection since taking over the Georgetown program in 1972 – and the Hoyas clung to a two-point lead with five seconds left in the game and Syracuse having little prospect of making even a long-range shot to tie. However, senior forward and team co-captain Sam Jefferson unnecessarily fouled Syracuse sophomore power forward Billy Owens, who sank both of his free throws to tie the game. Syracuse prevailed in overtime, beating the Hoyas 89–87.

Beginning with the regular-season-finale loss at Syracuse, the Hoyas stumbled in their final five games, losing three, each of them by five or fewer points. After a bye in the first round of the 1989 Big East tournament, Georgetown defeated Providence in the quarterfinals but lost to Connecticut in the semifinals. The Hoyas were the No. 3 seed in the Midwest Region of the 1990 NCAA Division I men's basketball tournament – the 12th of 14 consecutive Georgetown NCAA tournament appearances – and defeated Texas Southern in the first round before the Midwest Region' No. 6 seed, 25th-ranked Xavier, upset them in the second round. In the final seven games of the year, Mourning had been limited to an average of just over six shots per game, and that had hurt the Georgetown offense.

The Hoyas were ranked No. 8 in the season's final Associated Press Poll and No. 6 in the final Coaches' Poll. Mark Tillmon and Dwayne Bryant graduated in May 1990, Tillmon having had the best season of his career, averaging 19.8 points per game for the year and 12.7 for his career, and Bryant with a school-record shooting average from three-point range of 39.9%. During their four seasons on the team, the Hoyas had posted a record of 102–24 overall and 53–5 at home.

== Roster ==
Sophomore guard Ronny Thompson was the son of head coach John Thompson Jr.

#	Name	Height	Weight (lbs.)	Position	Class	Hometown	Previous Team(s)
10	David Edwards	5'10"	N/A	G	Fr.	New York, NY	Andrew Jackson HS
11	Kayode Vann	6'1"	175	G	Jr.	New York, NY	Berkeley Carroll School
12	Dwayne Bryant	6'2"	190	G	Sr.	New Orleans, LA	De La Salle HS
20	Mark Tillmon	6'2"	190	G	Sr.	Washington, DC	Gonzaga College HS
22	Johnny Jones	6'6"	N/A	F	Grad. Sch.	Coral Springs, FL	University of the District of Columbia
24	Anthony Allen	6'7"	N/A	F	Sr.	Port Arthur, TX	Abraham Lincoln HS
30	Ronny Thompson	6'4"	190	G	So.	Washington, DC	Flint Hill School (Oakton, VA)
33	Alonzo Mourning	6'10"	240	C/F	So.	Chesapeake, VA	Indian River HS
34	Michael Tate	6'6"	N/A	F	Fr.	Oxon Hill, MD	Oxon Hill HS
40	Milton Bell	6'7"	N/A	F	So.	Richmond, VA	John Marshall HS
41	Antoine Stoudamire	6'3"	180	G/F	Fr.	Portland, OR	Jesuit HS
44	Mike Sabol	6'7"	210	F	Fr.	Washington, DC	Gonzaga College HS
50	Sam Jefferson	6'9"	230	F	Sr.	Washington, DC	Flint Hill School (Oakton, VA)
55	Dikembe Mutombo	7'2"	245	C	Jr.	Kinshasa, Zaire	Institut Boboto

== Rankings ==
Ranking movement Legend: ██ Improvement in ranking. ██ Decrease in ranking. ██ Not ranked the previous week. RV=Others receiving votes.
Poll	Pre	Wk 1	Wk 2	Wk 3	Wk 4	Wk 5	Wk 6	Wk 7	Wk 8	Wk 9	Wk 10	Wk 11	Wk 12	Wk 13	Wk 14	Wk 15	Final
AP	5	3	3	3	3	3	3	2	2	3	6	5	3	5	7	5	8
Coaches	4	4	3	3	3	3	3	2	2	3	6	5	2	3	5	6	– (Note: No Coaches' Poll this week.)

== 1989–90 Schedule and results ==
Sources

- All times are Eastern

Date time, TV	Rank^{#}	Opponent^{#}	Result	Record	Site (attendance) city, state
Regular Season
Fri., Nov. 24, 1989*	No. 5	vs. Hawaii Loa; Hawaii Loa Classic	W 109−56	1–0	Kaneohe Armory (671); Kaneohe, HI
Sat., Nov. 25, 1989*	No. 5	vs. Hawaii Pacific; Hawaii Loa Classic	W 79−57	2–0	Kaneohe Armory (845); Kaneohe, HI
Sat., Dec. 2, 1989*	No. 3	Florida International	W 114−67	3–0	Capital Centre (7,494); Landover, MD
Thu., Dec. 7, 1989*	No. 3	vs. No. 17 North Carolina; ACC−Big East Challenge	W 93−81	4–0	Brendan Byrne Arena (18,641); East Rutherford, NJ
Sat., Dec. 9, 1989*	No. 3	Rice	W 81−60	5–0	Capital Centre (7,057); Landover, MD
Wed., Dec. 13, 1989*	No. 3	Saint Leo	W 92–51	6–0	Capital Centre (N/A); Landover, MD
Sat., Dec. 16, 1989*	No. 3	District of Columbia	W 112–39	7–0	Capital Centre (N/A); Landover, MD
Wed., Dec. 20, 1989*	No. 3	Virginia Tech	W 97–64	8–0	Capital Centre (15,982); Landover, MD
Fri., Dec. 29, 1989*	No. 3	vs. Northern Iowa	W 83−49	9–0	Thomas & Mack Center (4,348); Paradise, NV
Tue., Jan. 2, 1990	No. 3	at Boston College	W 83–53	10–0 (1–0)	Silvio O. Conte Forum (8,674); Chestnut Hill, MA
Sat., Jan. 6, 1990	No. 3	Providence	W 93−91	11–0 (2–0)	Capital Centre (15,891); Landover, MD
Mon., Jan. 8, 1990	No. 3	at Pittsburgh	W 87−71	12–0 (3–0)	Civic Arena (16,588); Pittsburgh, PA
Sat., Jan. 13, 1990*	No. 2	at DePaul	W 74–64	13–0	Rosemont Horizon (N/A); Rosemont, IL
Wed., Jan. 17, 1990	No. 2	Boston College	W 68–45	14–0 (4–0)	Capital Centre (10,291); Landover, MD
Sat., Jan. 20, 1990	No. 2	at Connecticut; Rivalry	L 65–70	14–1 (4–1)	Hartford Civic Center (16,294); Hartford, CT
Mon., Jan. 22, 1990	No. 2	at Villanova	W 70–69	15–1 (5–1)	Spectrum (16,407); Philadelphia, PA
Sat., Jan 20, 1990	No. 3	No. 11 Syracuse; Rivalry	L 76–95	15–2 (5–2)	Capital Centre (16,683); Landover, MD
Tue., Jan. 30, 1990	No. 6	Seton Hall	W 70–48	16–2 (6–2)	Capital Centre (10,504); Landover, MD
Sat., Feb. 3, 1990	No. 6	at No. 18 St. John's	W 74–67	17–2 (7–2)	Madison Square Garden (17,588); New York, NY
Wed., Feb. 7, 1990	No. 5	Pittsburgh	W 97–81	18−2 (8–2)	Capital Centre (12,630); Landover, MD
Sat., Feb. 10, 1990*	No. 5	Florida	W 56–40	19–2	Capital Centre (13,538); Landover, MD
Tue., Feb. 13, 1990	No. 3	at Providence	L 90–94	19−3 (8–3)	Providence Civic Center (13,106); Providence, RI
Sat., Feb. 17, 1990	No. 3	at Seton Hall	W 68–60	20–3 (9–3)	Brendan Byrne Arena (17,181); East Rutherford, NJ
Wed., Feb. 21, 1990	No. 5	St. John's	L 62–63	20–4 (9–4)	Capital Centre (13,748); Landover, MD
Sat., Feb 24, 1990	No. 5	Villanova	W 83–53	21–4 (10–4)	Capital Centre (19,035); Landover, MD
Wed., Feb. 28, 1990	No. 7	No. 4 Connecticut; Rivalry	W 84–64	22–4 (11–4)	Capital Centre (19,035); Landover, MD
Sun., Mar. 4, 1990	No. 7	at No. 10 Syracuse; Rivalry	L 87–89 ^{OT}	22–5 (11–5)	Carrier Dome (33,015); Syracuse, NY
Big East tournament
Fri., Mar. 9, 1990	(3) No. 5	vs. (6) Providence; Quarterfinals	W 78–77	23–5	Madison Square Garden (17,588); New York, NY
Sat., Mar. 10, 1990	(3) No. 5	vs. (2) No. 8 Connecticut; Semifinals/Rivalry	L 60–65	23–6	Madison Square Garden (17,588); New York, NY
NCAA tournament
Fri., Mar. 16, 1990	(3 MW) No. 8	vs. (14 MW) Texas Southern; First round	W 70–52	24–6	Hoosier Dome (39,417); Indianapolis, IN
Sun., Mar. 18, 1990	(3 MW) No. 8	vs. (6 MW) No. 25 Xavier; Second round	L 71–74	24–7	Hoosier Dome (N/A); Indianapolis, IN
*Non-conference game. ^{#}Rankings from AP Poll. (#) Tournament seedings in parentheses.
