= Terry Mills (basketball) =

American basketball player (born 1967)

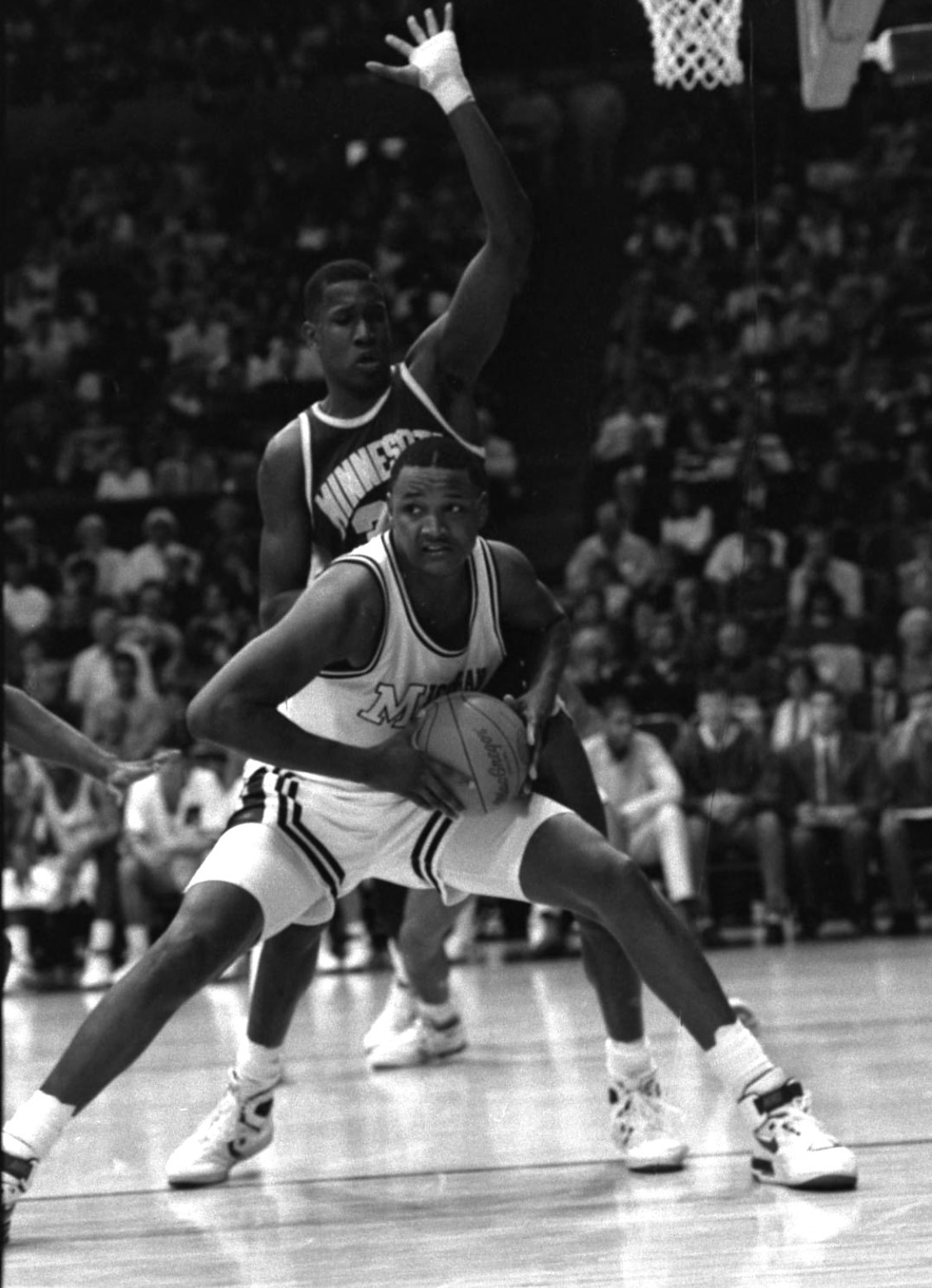
- Mills, 1989 UM Men's Basketball vs MSU, Minnesota

Personal information
- Born: December 21, 1967 (age 58) Romulus, Michigan, U.S.
- Listed height: 6 ft 10 in (2.08 m)
- Listed weight: 280 lb (127 kg)

Career information
- High school: Romulus (Romulus, Michigan)
- College: Michigan (1987–1990)
- NBA draft: 1990: 1st round, 16th overall pick
- Drafted by: Milwaukee Bucks
- Playing career: 1990–2001
- Position: Power forward
- Number: 5, 6

Career history
- 1990: PAOK
- 1990–1991: Denver Nuggets
- 1991–1992: New Jersey Nets
- 1992–1997: Detroit Pistons
- 1997–1999: Miami Heat
- 1999–2000: Detroit Pistons
- 2000–2001: Indiana Pacers

Career highlights
- NCAA champion (1989); 2× First-team Parade All-American (1985, 1986); McDonald's All-American (1986); Mr. Basketball of Michigan (1986)

Career NBA statistics
- Points: 7,175 (10.6 ppg)
- Rebounds: 3,680 (5.4 rpg)
- Blocks: 296 (0.4 bpg)
- Stats at NBA.com
- Stats at Basketball Reference

Terry Richard Mills (born December 21, 1967) is an American former professional basketball player who played in the National Basketball Association (NBA) as a power forward. He was a member of the Michigan Wolverines' 1989 National Collegiate Athletic Association (NCAA) Men's Division I Basketball Championship winning team before playing over a decade in the NBA.

== College career ==
After a standout career at Romulus High School, Mills was named 1986 Mr. Basketball of Michigan.

Mills attended the University of Michigan where he helped the Wolverines win the 1989 NCAA Men's Division I Basketball Championship.

In January 2009, Mills participated in the 20th anniversary celebration of the 1989 National Championship team. He had recently completed his degree from Michigan and was looking to break into the coaching profession.

== PAOK ==
In 1990 summer, Mills signed a professional contract with P.A.O.K. BC. After several friendly games which included a home game against Maccabi Tel Aviv B.C., Mills left the club. The reason was an argument with Kostas Politis, during a training in Spain.

== NBA career ==
Mills was drafted in 1990 by the Milwaukee Bucks who later traded his rights to the Denver Nuggets for whom he played 17 games. Mills also played for the New Jersey Nets, Detroit Pistons, Miami Heat, and Indiana Pacers. Although he played the power forward position, Mills became known for his 3-point shooting. Legendary Piston announcer George Blaha nicknamed him "Sugar Bear" for his "sweet" shooting stroke and "Three Mills" for his on-target three-point shooting.

== Coaching career ==
Mills was the head coach of the International Basketball League's Macomb County Mustangs (of Center Line, Michigan) during the 2006 season.

== Personal life ==
He is the cousin of former NBA power forward Grant Long, and the nephew of shooting guard John Long.

He is the radio color analyst for University of Michigan Basketball on the Michigan Sports Marketing Network.

Currently residing in Michigan, he is an active participant in amateur drag racing.
