= 1989–90 Villanova Wildcats men's basketball team =

American college basketball season

1989–90 Villanova Wildcats men's basketball

NCAA tournament, Round of 64
- Conference: Big East Conference
- Record: 18–15 (8–8 Big East)
- Head coach: Rollie Massimino (17th season)
- Assistant coach: Jay Wright (3rd season)
- Home arena: John Eleuthère du Pont Pavilion (Capacity: 6,500)

1989–90 Big East men's basketball standings
	Conf.				Overall
Team	W		L	PCT	W		L	PCT
No. 4 Connecticut†	12	–	4	.750	31	–	6	.838
No. 6 Syracuse	12	–	4	.750	26	–	7	.788
No. 8 Georgetown	11	–	5	.688	24	–	7	.774
St. John's	10	–	6	.625	24	–	10	.706
Villanova	8	–	8	.500	18	–	15	.545
Providence	8	–	8	.500	17	–	12	.586
Seton Hall	5	–	11	.313	12	–	16	.429
Pittsburgh	5	–	11	.313	12	–	17	.414
Boston College	1	–	15	.063	8	–	20	.286
† 1990 Big East tournament winner As of April 2, 1990; Rankings from AP Poll

The 1989–90 Villanova Wildcats men's basketball team represented Villanova University in the 1989–90 season. The head coach was Rollie Massimino. The team played its home games at The Pavilion in Villanova, Pennsylvania, and was a member of the Big East Conference.

== Roster ==
1989–90 Villanova Wildcats men's basketball team
Players
Coaches

Pos.	#	Name	Height	Weight	Year	Hometown
F	34	Barry Bekkedam	6 ft 10 in (2.08 m)	—	Sr
G	4	Greg Downs	—	—	Jr
C	33	Tom Greis	7 ft 5 in (2.26 m)	—	Sr
G	44	Eric Leslie	6 ft 3 in (1.91 m)	—	Sr
G	21	Chris Masotti	5 ft 11 in (1.8 m)	—	Jr
G	32	Tim Muller	6 ft 2 in (1.88 m)	—	Jr
F	35	Rodney Taylor	6 ft 6 in (1.98 m)	—	Sr
G	12	Rob Tribuiani	—	—	Jr

Head coach

- Rollie Massimino (Vermont)

Assistant coach(es)

Legend

- (C) Team captain
- (S) Suspended
- (I) Ineligible
- (W) Walk-on
- Injured
- Current redshirt

== Schedule and results ==
Date time, TV	Rank^{#}	Opponent^{#}	Result	Record	Site city, state
Regular season
Nov 24, 1989*		vs. San Diego State; Maui Invitational	W 66–58	1–0	Lahaina Civic Center; Honolulu, Hawaii
Nov 25, 1989*		vs. No. 7 North Carolina; Maui Invitational	L 68–78	1–1	Lahaina Civic Center; Honolulu, Hawaii
Nov 26, 1989*		vs. No. 12 Louisville; Maui Invitational	L 69–83	1–2	Lahaina Civic Center; Honolulu, Hawaii
Nov 30, 1989*		Saint Francis (PA)	W 93–72	2–2	The Pavilion; Philadelphia, Pennsylvania
Dec 2, 1989*		Vermont	W 76–60	3–2	The Pavilion; Philadelphia, Pennsylvania
Dec 4, 1989*		Pennsylvania	W 75–46	4–2	The Pavilion; Philadelphia, Pennsylvania
Dec 7, 1989*		vs. Virginia	L 65–73	4–3	
Dec 12, 1989		at Connecticut	W 64–57	5–3 (1–0)	Gampel Pavilion; Storrs, Connecticut
Dec 16, 1989*		Drexel	W 74–57	6–3	The Pavilion; Philadelphia, Pennsylvania
Dec 22, 1989*		at No. 23 La Salle	L 70–71	6–4	Palestra; Philadelphia, Pennsylvania
Dec 23, 1989*		at Furman	L 73–77	6–5	Memorial Auditorium; Greenville, South Carolina
Dec 27, 1989*		vs. Clemson	W 73–71	7–5	San Diego Sports Arena; San Diego, California
Dec 28, 1989*		at San Diego State	W 57–52	8–5	San Diego Sports Arena; San Diego, California
Jan 2, 1990		Seton Hall	L 64–67	8–6 (1–1)	The Pavilion; Philadelphia, Pennsylvania
Jan 6, 1990		at No. 1 Syracuse	W 93–74	9–6 (2–1)	Carrier Dome; Syracuse, New York
Jan 9, 1990		Connecticut	L 54–71	9–7 (2–2)	The Pavilion; Philadelphia, Pennsylvania
Jan 13, 1990		at Providence	W 102–74	10–7 (3–2)	Providence Civic Center; Providence, Rhode Island
Jan 16, 1990*		No. 15 St. John's	L 58–64	10–8 (3–3)	The Pavilion; Philadelphia, Pennsylvania
Jan 20, 1990*		Saint Joseph's	W 69–62	11–8	The Pavilion; Philadelphia, Pennsylvania
Jan 22, 1990		No. 2 Georgetown	L 69–70	11–9 (3–4)	The Pavilion; Philadelphia, Pennsylvania
Jan 27, 1990		at Seton Hall	L 61–66	11–10 (3–5)	Brendan Byrne Arena; East Rutherford, New Jersey
Jan 30, 1990		Providence	W 96–88	12–10 (4–5)	The Pavilion; Philadelphia, Pennsylvania
Feb 3, 1990		at Pittsburgh	L 82–94	12–11 (4–6)	Fitzgerald Field House; Pittsburgh, Pennsylvania
Feb 6, 1990		at Boston College	W 66–65	13–11 (5–6)	Silvio O. Conte Forum; Boston, Massachusetts
Feb 10, 1990		at No. 24 St. John's	L 69–83	13–12 (5–7)	Madison Square Garden; New York, New York
Feb 12, 1990		No. 6 Syracuse	W 60–56	14–12 (6–7)	The Pavilion; Philadelphia, Pennsylvania
Feb 17, 1990		Pittsburgh	W 71–68	15–12 (7–7)	The Pavilion; Philadelphia, Pennsylvania
Feb 21, 1990*		at Temple	W 71–69	16–12	McGonigle Hall; Philadelphia, Pennsylvania
Feb 24, 1990		at No. 5 Georgetown	L 53–83	16–13 (7–8)	Capital Centre; Landover, Maryland
Feb 27, 1990		Boston College	W 69–59	17–13 (8–8)	The Pavilion; Philadelphia, Pennsylvania
Big East tournament
Mar 9, 1990*		at St. John's; Big East tournament Quarterfinal	W 70–60	18–13	Madison Square Garden; New York, New York
Mar 10, 1990*		vs. No. 4 Syracuse; Big East tournament Semifinal	L 61–73	18–14	Madison Square Garden; New York, New York
NCAA tournament
Mar 15, 1990*	(12 SE)	vs. (5 SE) No. 19 LSU; First Round	L 63–70	18–15	Thompson-Boling Arena; Knoxville, Tennessee
*Non-conference game. ^{#}Rankings from AP poll. (#) Tournament seedings in parentheses. SE=Southeast. All times are in Easter Time.
