= Mark Tillmon =

American basketball player

Personal information
- Born: February 11, 1968 (age 58) Little Rock, Arkansas, U.S.
- Listed height: 6 ft 2 in (1.88 m)
- Listed weight: 190 lb (86 kg)

Career information
- High school: Gonzaga (Washington, D.C.)
- College: Georgetown (1986–1990)
- NBA draft: 1990: undrafted
- Position: Guard

Career history
- 1990–1991: Quad City Thunder
- 1991: San Jose Jammers
- 1991–1992: Bakersfield Jammers
- 1992: Albany Patroons
- 1992–1993: Elosúa León
- 1993–1994: Yakima Sun Kings
- 1994–1995: Rapid City Thrillers

Career highlights
- First-team All-Big East (1990); Big East All-Freshman Team (1987); AP honorable mention All-American (1990); McDonald's All-American (1986); Fourth-team Parade All-American (1986)

Mark Anthony Tillmon (born February 11, 1968) is an American former basketball professional player.

== High school career ==
Tillmon was born in Little Rock, Arkansas but attended Gonzaga College High School in Washington, D.C. where he was a teammate of Perry Carter, another highly recruited player. Tillmon had a successful career at Gonzaga, being regarded as one of the best guards of his class. He averaged 22.1 points, 6.8 rebounds and 3.4 assists during his senior year, he was selected to the Parade All-America fourth team and was named a McDonald's All-American. In the 1986 McDonald's All-American Boys Game he did not score, going 0/3 from the field and 0/1 from the free throw line. He also played in the Capital Classic, another high school All-Star game, where he had a much better performance, scoring 18 points shooting 9/16. He was considered a reliable scorer with good playmaking skills.

== College career ==
Tillmon was undecided about his college choice until April; he later committed to Georgetown. During his first year of college Tillmon earned a starting spot on the team, playing 33 games and starting 25 of them. He finished as the third top scorer of his team and was selected in the All-Big East Freshman Team at the end of the 1986–87 season. He had struggled with his shooting during his freshman year, but his second season saw improved percentages, especially in his 3-point shooting, where he went from .311 to .402. His scoring average also improved, and Tillmon was the second best scorer behind Charles Smith. In his junior year Tillmon lost his spot to Jaren Jackson, who became the starting shooting guard for the Georgetown 1988–89 season: Tillmon's minutes dropped to 18.9 per game, being Jackson's backup.

His senior year of college was his best. He started all the games and saw career highs in all statistical categories, especially his scoring: with 19.8 points per game he was the primary offensive threat of that year's Georgetown team. At the end of the season he was in the All-Big East First Team and he was also named an NCAA All-American Honorable Mention.

=== College statistics ===
Year	Team	GP	GS	MPG	FG%	3P%	FT%	RPG	APG	SPG	BPG	PPG
1986–87	Georgetown	33	25	21.1	.390	.311	.612	2.7	1.3	0.8	0.1	9.2
1987–88	Georgetown	30	24	24.3	.471	.402	.594	3.1	1.8	1.0	0.2	13.8
1988–89	Georgetown	32	3	18.9	.437	.338	.662	2.3	1.1	0.7	0.1	8.3
1989–90	Georgetown	31	31	31.0	.471	.431	.737	4.1	1.4	1.7	0.3	19.8
Career		126	83	23.7	.447	.382	.667	3.0	1.4	1.0	0.2	12.7

== Professional career ==
Tillmon was automatically eligible for the 1990 NBA draft, but he went undrafted. After the draft he joined the Utah Jazz as a free agent for the preseason, but he was the last player to be cut and he did not make the final roster. Tillmon was drafted with the 30th overall pick in the 1990 CBA Draft by the Quad City Thunder. He played 9 games for the Thunder, and then transferred to the San Jose Jammers where he played for the remained of the season. He played the first part of the 1991–92 CBA season with the Bakersfield Jammers, but the team was disbanded in the middle of the season and Tillmon transferred to the Albany Patroons where he played the remaining games.

In 1992 he signed with Liga ACB team Elosúa León where he played a whole season, starting 19 of the 22 games he played averaging 14.8 points, 2.9 rebounds and 3.6 assists. Elosúa León replaced Tillmon with Michael Anderson in January 1993, and after the European experience Tillmon decided to return in the United States, playing two more seasons in the CBA before retiring.
