= 1989–90 Pittsburgh Panthers men's basketball team =

American college basketball season

1989–90 Pittsburgh Panthers men's basketball
- Conference: Big East Conference (1979–2013)
- Record: 12–17 (5–11 Big East)
- Head coach: Paul Evans (4th season)
- Assistant coaches: Norm Law (4th season); Mark Coleman (4th season); John Sarandrea (2nd season)
- Home arena: Fitzgerald Field House (Capacity: 4,122); Pittsburgh Civic Arena (Capacity: 17,537)

1989–90 Big East men's basketball standings
	Conf.				Overall
Team	W		L	PCT	W		L	PCT
No. 4 Connecticut†	12	–	4	.750	31	–	6	.838
No. 6 Syracuse	12	–	4	.750	26	–	7	.788
No. 8 Georgetown	11	–	5	.688	24	–	7	.774
St. John's	10	–	6	.625	24	–	10	.706
Villanova	8	–	8	.500	18	–	15	.545
Providence	8	–	8	.500	17	–	12	.586
Seton Hall	5	–	11	.313	12	–	16	.429
Pittsburgh	5	–	11	.313	12	–	17	.414
Boston College	1	–	15	.063	8	–	20	.286
† 1990 Big East tournament winner As of April 2, 1990; Rankings from AP Poll

The 1989–90 Pittsburgh Panthers men's basketball team represented the University of Pittsburgh in the 1989–90 NCAA Division I men's basketball season. Led by head coach Paul Evans, the Panthers finished with a record of 12–17.
