= Georgetown–UConn men's basketball rivalry =

American college basketball rivalry

- UConn Huskies Georgetown Hoyas
- Sport: Men's basketball
- First meeting: December 22, 1958; Connecticut 76, Georgetown 68
- Latest meeting: March 13, 2026; UConn 67, Georgetown 51
- Next meeting: December 23, 2026

Statistics
- Total meetings: 79
- All-time series: UConn leads 43–36 (.544)
- Largest victory: Georgetown, 93–62 (1985)
- Longest win streak: 13 (Georgetown, 1982-88; UConn, 2021–present)
- Current win streak: UConn, 13 (2021–present)

Locations of Georgetown and UConn

The Georgetown–UConn men's basketball rivalry is an American college basketball rivalry between the UConn Huskies men's basketball team of the University of Connecticut and Georgetown Hoyas men's basketball team of Georgetown University. UConn leads the all-time series 43–36.

== History ==
The first game played between the two schools took place on December 22, 1958, in Storrs, Connecticut. Connecticut won 76–68.

The rivalry began — and peaked — while both teams were members of the original Big East Conference from 1979 to 2013. The two schools each won a record seven Big East tournaments during those years. Georgetown dominated the rivalry during the 1980s and early 1990s, and Connecticut was the dominant team from the mid-1990s to the mid-2000s.

In 2013, Georgetown left the original Big East to join a new Big East Conference, while Connecticut — rebranded as "UConn" that year — remained behind in the old conference, which became the American Athletic Conference, marketed as "The American." The two schools met in non-conference games in 2016 and 2017. UConn moved to the new Big East Conference for the 2020–21 season, renewing the rivalry within the Big East which, like the American Athletic Conference, claims the history and heritage of the original Big East as its own. Since moving to the new Big East Conference, UConn has dominated the rivalry.

UConn last beat the Hoyas, 67–51, on March 13, 2026. Georgetown last beat the Huskies, 72–69, on January 14, 2017.

== Game results ==
| UConn victories | Georgetown victories |

| No. | Date | Location | Winner | Score | | Series | Notes |
| No. | Date | Location | Winner | UC | GU | Series | Notes |
|---|---|---|---|---|---|---|---|
| 1 | December 22, 1958 | Storrs, CT | Connecticut | 76 | 68 | Connecticut 1–0 | Non-conference |
| 2 | February 25, 1961 | Washington, DC | Georgetown | 80 | 99 | Tied 1–1 | Non-conference |
| 3 | February 4, 1971 | Washington, DC | Georgetown | 75 | 98 | Georgetown 2–1 | Non-conference |
| 4 | February 3, 1972 | Storrs, CT | Connecticut | 89 | 81 | Tied 2–2 | Non-conference |
| 5 | January 13, 1973 | Storrs, CT | Connecticut | 78 | 64 | Connecticut 3–2 | Non-conference |
| 6 | February 16, 1974 | Washington, DC | Georgetown | 66 | 67 | Tied 3–3 | Non-conference |
| 7 | February 2, 1980 | Washington, DC | Georgetown | 64 | 84 | Georgetown 4–3 | First meeting in original Big East Conference |
| 8 | January 24, 1981 | Storrs, CT | Connecticut | 75^{OT} | 73 | Tied 4–4 | |
| 9 | February 28, 1981 | Washington, DC | Georgetown | 58 | 60 | Georgetown 5–4 | |
| 10 | January 20, 1982 | Landover, MD | Connecticut | 63 | 52 | Tied 5–5 | |
| 11 | February 27, 1982 | Hartford, CT | Georgetown | 42 | 60 | Georgetown 6–5 | |
| 12 | January 15, 1983 | Landover, MD | Georgetown | 53 | 74 | Georgetown 7–5 | |
| 13 | February 14, 1983 | Hartford, CT | Georgetown | 60 | 77 | Georgetown 8–5 | |
| 14 | January 4, 1984 | Hartford, CT | #4 Georgetown | 69 | 81 | Georgetown 9–5 | |
| 15 | February 4, 1984 | Landover, MD | #4 Georgetown | 62 | 87 | Georgetown 10–5 | |
| 16 | January 23, 1985 | Landover, MD | Georgetown | 66 | 79 | Georgetown 11–5 | |
| 17 | February 23, 1985 | Hartford, CT | Georgetown | 47 | 68 | Georgetown 12–5 | |
| 18 | March 6, 1985 | New York, NY | Georgetown | 62 | 93 | Georgetown 13–5 | 1985 Big East Tournament |
| 19 | January 8, 1986 | Landover, MD | Georgetown | 66 | 70 | Georgetown 14–5 | |
| 20 | February 5, 1986 | Hartford, CT | Georgetown | 63 | 80 | Georgetown 15–5 | |
| 21 | January 21, 1987 | Landover, MD | #15 Georgetown | 51 | 65 | Georgetown 16–5 | |
| 22 | February 11, 1987 | Hartford, CT | #13 Georgetown | 57 | 78 | Georgetown 17–5 | |
| 23 | January 30, 1988 | Landover, MD | #15 Georgetown | 59 | 60 | Georgetown 18–5 | |
| 24 | February 6, 1988 | Hartford, CT | Connecticut | 66 | 59 | Georgetown 18–6 | |
| 25 | January 21, 1989 | Landover, MD | #3 Georgetown | 55 | 59 | Georgetown 19–6 | |
| 26 | February 8, 1989 | Hartford, CT | #2 Georgetown | 58 | 70 | Georgetown 20–6 | |
| 27 | January 20, 1990 | Hartford, CT | Connecticut | 70 | 65 | Georgetown 20–7 | |
| 28 | February 28, 1990 | Landover, MD | #7 Georgetown | 64 | 84 | Georgetown 21–7 | |
| 29 | March 10, 1990 | New York, NY | #8 Connecticut | 65 | 60 | Georgetown 21–8 | 1990 Big East Tournament |
| 30 | February 11, 1991 | Hartford, CT | Connecticut | 61 | 55 | Georgetown 21–9 | |
| 31 | February 23, 1991 | Landover, MD | #25 Georgetown | 57 | 71 | Georgetown 22–9 | |
| 32 | March 8, 1991 | New York, NY | Georgetown | 49 | 68 | Georgetown 23–9 | 1991 Big East Tournament |
| 33 | February 12, 1992 | Hartford, CT | Georgetown | 63 | 70 | Georgetown 24–9 | |
| 34 | February 19, 1992 | Landover, MD | Georgetown | 58 | 60 | Georgetown 25–9 | |
| 35 | January 18, 1993 | Hartford, CT | #18 Georgetown | 69 | 86 | Georgetown 26–9 | |
| 36 | March 7, 1993 | Landover, MD | Georgetown | 56 | 70 | Georgetown 27–9 | |
| 37 | January 4, 1994 | Hartford, CT | #16 Connecticut | 77 | 65 | Georgetown 27–10 | |
| 38 | February 28, 1994 | Landover, MD | #4 Connecticut | 66 | 62 | Georgetown 27–11 | |
| 39 | January 16, 1995 | Hartford, CT | #2 Connecticut | 93 | 73 | Georgetown 27–12 | |
| 40 | February 14, 1995 | Landover, MD | #1 Connecticut | 91 | 85 | Georgetown 27–13 | |
| 41 | March 11, 1995 | New York, NY | #6 Connecticut | 88 | 81 | Georgetown 27–14 | 1995 Big East Tournament |
| 42 | February 19, 1996 | Landover, MD | #11 Georgetown | 65 | 77 | Georgetown 28–14 | |
| 43 | March 9, 1996 | New York, NY | #3 Connecticut | 75 | 74 | Georgetown 28–15 | 1996 Big East Tournament |
| 44 | January 11, 1997 | Landover, MD | Connecticut | 69 | 54 | Georgetown 28–16 | |
| 45 | February 3, 1997 | Hartford, CT | Georgetown | 51 | 52 | Georgetown 29–16 | |
| 46 | January 17, 1998 | Hartford, CT | #10 Connecticut | 86 | 72 | Georgetown 29–17 | |
| 47 | January 2, 1999 | Storrs, CT | #1 Connecticut | 87 | 64 | Georgetown 29–18 | |
| 48 | January 25, 1999 | Washington, DC | #1 Connecticut | 78 | 71 | Georgetown 29–19 | |
| 49 | January 22, 2000 | Washington, DC | #8 Connecticut | 92 | 71 | Georgetown 29–20 | |
| 50 | March 10, 2000 | New York, NY | #21 Connecticut | 70 | 55 | Georgetown 29–21 | 2000 Big East Tournament |
| 51 | February 19, 2002 | Washington, DC | Connecticut | 75 | 74 | Georgetown 29–22 | |
| 52 | January 14, 2004 | Storrs, CT | #1 Connecticut | 94 | 70 | Georgetown 29–23 | |
| 53 | January 8, 2005 | Washington, DC | #10 Connecticut | 66 | 59 | Georgetown 29–24 | |
| 54 | March 2, 2005 | Storrs, CT | #15 Connecticut | 83 | 64 | Georgetown 29–25 | |
| 55 | March 10, 2005 | New York, NY | #12 Connecticut | 66 | 62 | Georgetown 29–26 | 2005 Big East Tournament |
| 56 | January 14, 2006 | Hartford, CT | #4 Connecticut | 74 | 67 | Georgetown 29–27 | |
| 57 | March 3, 2007 | Washington, DC | #10 Georgetown | 46 | 59 | Georgetown 30–27 | |
| 58 | January 12, 2008 | Washington, DC | #7 Georgetown | 69 | 72 | Georgetown 31–27 | |
| 59 | December 29, 2008 | Hartford, CT | #11 Georgetown | 63 | 74 | Georgetown 32–27 | |
| 60 | January 9, 2010 | Washington, DC | #12 Georgetown | 69 | 72 | Georgetown 33–27 | |
| 61 | February 16, 2011 | Hartford, CT | #13 Connecticut | 78 | 70 | Georgetown 33–28 | |
| 62 | March 9, 2011 | New York, NY | #21 Connecticut | 79 | 62 | Georgetown 33–29 | 2011 Big East Tournament |
| 63 | February 1, 2012 | Washington, DC | #14 Georgetown | 44 | 58 | Georgetown 34–29 | |
| 64 | February 27, 2013 | Storrs, CT | #7 Georgetown | 78 | 79^{2OT} | Georgetown 35–29 | Last meeting in original Big East Conference |
| 65 | January 23, 2016 | Hartford, CT | UConn | 68 | 62 | Georgetown 35–30 | Non-conference |
| 66 | January 14, 2017 | Washington, DC | Georgetown | 69 | 72 | Georgetown 36–30 | Non-conference |
| 67 | February 23, 2021 | Washington, DC | UConn | 70 | 57 | Georgetown 36–31 | First meeting in new Big East Conference |
| 68 | March 6, 2021 | Storrs, CT | UConn | 98 | 82 | Georgetown 36–32 | |
| 69 | January 25, 2022 | Storrs, CT | #20 UConn | 96 | 73 | Georgetown 36–33 | |
| 70 | February 27, 2022 | Washington, DC | #21 UConn | 86 | 77 | Georgetown 36–34 | |
| 71 | December 20, 2022 | Storrs, CT | #2 UConn | 84 | 73 | Georgetown 36–35 | |
| 72 | February 4, 2023 | Washington, DC | #24 UConn | 68 | 62 | Tied 36–36 | |
| 73 | January 14, 2024 | Hartford, CT | #4 UConn | 80 | 67 | UConn 37–36 | |
| 74 | February 10, 2024 | Washington, DC | #1 UConn | 89 | 64 | UConn 38–36 | |
| 75 | January 11, 2025 | Washington, DC | #9 UConn | 68 | 60 | UConn 39–36 | |
| 76 | February 26, 2025 | Hartford, CT | UConn | 93 | 79 | UConn 40–36 | |
| 77 | January 17, 2026 | Washington, DC | #3 UConn | 64 | 62 | UConn 41–36 | |
| 78 | February 14, 2026 | Storrs, CT | #6 UConn | 79 | 75 | UConn 42–36 | |
| 79 | March 13, 2026 | New York, NY | #6 UConn | 67 | 51 | UConn 43–36 | 2026 Big East Tournament |
