= Abdul Shamsid-Deen =

American basketball player

Personal information
- Born: August 1, 1968 (age 58) Staten Island, New York, U.S.
- Listed height: 6 ft 10 in (2.08 m)
- Listed weight: 225 lb (102 kg)

Career information
- High school: Tottenville (Staten Island, New York)
- College: Providence (1986–1990)
- NBA draft: 1990: 2nd round, 53rd overall pick
- Drafted by: Seattle SuperSonics
- Playing career: 1990–2002
- Position: Center

Career history
- 1990–1992: Racing Paris
- 1992: Santeros de Aguada
- 1992–1993: CB Girona
- 1993–1994: Bayer Leverkusen
- 1994: Vaqueros de Bayamón
- 1994–1995: Bayer Leverkusen
- 1995: Strasbourg IG
- 1995–1996: Ülkerspor
- 1996: Santeros de Aguada
- 1996–1997: Xacobeo 99 Ourense
- 1997: Cocodrilos de Caracas
- 1997: Leones de Ponce
- 1997: Hapoel Galil Elyon
- 1998: Maccabi Rishon LeZion
- 1998–1999: AEL Limassol
- 1999: Zagłębie Sosnowiec
- 1999: Brooklyn Kings
- 1999–2000: ratiopharm Ulm
- 2000–2001: Brandt Hagen
- 2001: Obras Sanitarias
- 2001: Maratonistas de Coamo
- 2001–2002: Traiskirchen Lions
- 2002: Toros de Aragua
- 2002: San Carlos
- 2002: Maratonistas de Coamo
- Stats at Basketball Reference

Abdul Rahman Shamsid-Deen (born August 1, 1968) is an American retired professional basketball player.

== College years ==
Shamsid-Deen played college basketball for the Providence College Friars, primarily at the center position.

== Professional career ==
Shamsid-Deen was selected by the Seattle SuperSonics in the second round (53rd overall pick) of the 1990 NBA draft. He never played a game for Seattle, but went on to play abroad, in Spain, Puerto Rico, Germany and Turkey.
