= 1989–90 St. John's Redmen basketball team =

American college basketball season

1989–90 St. John's Redmen men's basketball

Lapchick Memorial Champions Preseason NIT Runner Up

NCAA men's Division I tournament, second round
- Conference: Big East Conference
- Record: 24–10 (10–6 Big East)
- Head coach: Lou Carnesecca
- Assistant coaches: Brian Mahoney; Al LoBalbo; Ron Rutledge
- Home arena: Alumni Hall; Madison Square Garden

1989–90 Big East men's basketball standings
	Conf.				Overall
Team	W		L	PCT	W		L	PCT
No. 4 Connecticut†	12	–	4	.750	31	–	6	.838
No. 6 Syracuse	12	–	4	.750	26	–	7	.788
No. 8 Georgetown	11	–	5	.688	24	–	7	.774
St. John's	10	–	6	.625	24	–	10	.706
Villanova	8	–	8	.500	18	–	15	.545
Providence	8	–	8	.500	17	–	12	.586
Seton Hall	5	–	11	.313	12	–	16	.429
Pittsburgh	5	–	11	.313	12	–	17	.414
Boston College	1	–	15	.063	8	–	20	.286
† 1990 Big East tournament winner As of April 2, 1990; Rankings from AP Poll

The 1989–90 St. John's Redmen men's basketball team represented St. John's University during the 1989–90 NCAA Division I men's basketball season. The team was coached by Lou Carnesecca in his twenty-second year at the school. St. John's home games are played at Alumni Hall and Madison Square Garden and the team is a member of the Big East Conference.

== Off season ==
=== Departures ===
Name	Number	Pos.	Height	Weight	Year	Hometown	Notes
Kevin Fitzpatrick	15	G			Senior		Graduated
Matt Brust	23	G/F	6'4"		RS Senior		Graduated

=== Class of 1989 signees ===
College recruiting information
Name	Hometown	School	Height	Weight	Commit date
David Cain; PG	Bronx, NY	Adlai E. Stevenson High School	6 ft 0 in (1.83 m)	N/A	
David Cain; PG	Recruit ratings: No ratings found				
Carl Beckett; SG	Queens, NY	Christ the King High School	6 ft 4 in (1.93 m)	N/A	
Carl Beckett; SG	Recruit ratings: No ratings found				
Overall recruit ranking:
Note: In many cases, Scout, Rivals, 247Sports, On3, and ESPN may conflict in their listings of height and weight.; In these cases, the average was taken. ESPN grades are on a 100-point scale.; Sources: "1989 Team Ranking". Rivals.

== Roster ==
1989–90 St. John's Red Storm men's basketball team
Players
Coaches

Pos.	#	Name	Height	Weight	Year	Previous school	Hometown
G	3	Boo Harvey	5 ft 11 in (1.8 m)	—	Sr	Andrew Jackson/San Jacinto	St. Albans, NY
G	4	Darrell Aiken	6 ft 0 in (1.83 m)	—	Sr	John F. Kennedy/Westchester	New York, NY
G	5	David Cain	6 ft 0 in (1.83 m)	—	Fr	Adlai E. Stevenson	Bronx, NY
G	10	Terrence Mullin	6 ft 0 in (1.83 m)	—	So	Xaverian	Brooklyn, NY
F/C	11	Jayson Williams (injured)	6 ft 10 in (2.08 m)	—	Sr	Christ the King	New York, NY
G	12	Jason Buchanan	6 ft 2 in (1.88 m)	—	So	Nottingham	Syracuse, NY
G/F	13	Barry Milhaven	6 ft 5 in (1.96 m)	—	Sr	Schreiber/Nassau	Port Washington, NY
F	21	Malik Sealy	6 ft 8 in (2.03 m)	—	So	St. Nicholas of Tolentine	Bronx, NY
G/F	22	Chucky Sproling	6 ft 4 in (1.93 m)	—	So	Manual	Denver, CO
G	23	Charles Bemak	5 ft 10 in (1.78 m)	—	Fr	Northeast Catholic High School	Philadelphia, PA
G	24	Chris Pursoo (W)	6 ft 0 in (1.83 m)	—	So	Long Island Lutheran	Westbury, NY
G/F	30	Carl Beckett (I)	6 ft 4 in (1.93 m)	—	Fr	Christ the King	New York, NY
F	33	Billy Singleton	6 ft 6 in (1.98 m)	—	Jr	Adlai E. Stevenson	Bronx, NY
C	41	Robert Werdann	6 ft 11 in (2.11 m)	—	So	Archbishop Molloy	Sunnyside, NY
C	50	Sean Muto	6 ft 11 in (2.11 m)	—	Jr	Mechanicsburg	Mechanicsburg, PA

Head coach

- Lou Carnesecca (St. John's, '50)

Assistant coach(es)

- Brian Mahoney
- Al LoBalbo
- Ron Rutledge

Legend

- (C) Team captain
- (S) Suspended
- (I) Ineligible
- (W) Walk-on
- Injured
- Current redshirt

== Schedule and results ==
Date time, TV	Rank^{#}	Opponent^{#}	Result	Record	Site city, state
Regular season
11/16/89*	No. 25	North Carolina A&T; Dodge Preseason NIT First Round	W 64-57	1-0	Alumni Hall; Queens, NY
11/18/89*	No. 25	Houston; Dodge Preseason NIT Quarterfinal	W 76-69	2-0	Alumni Hall; Queens, NY
11/22/89*	No. 25	DePaul; Dodge Preseason NIT Semifinal	W 53-52	3-0	Madison Square Garden; New York, NY
11/24/89*	No. 25	Kansas; Dodge Preseason NIT Championship	L 57-66	3-1	Madison Square Garden; New York, NY
12/02/89*	No. 20	San Diego; Lapchick Tournament Opening Round	W 74-59	4-1	Alumni Hall; Queens, NY
12/03/89*	No. 20	Wright State; Lapchick Tournament Championship	W 76-56	5-1	Alumni Hall; Queens, NY
12/05/89*	No. 15	vs. No. 19 North Carolina State; ACC-Big East Challenge	L 58-67	5-2	Greensboro Coliseum; Greensboro, NC
12/09/89*	No. 15	Hofstra	W 58-47	6-2	Alumni Hall; Queens, NY
12/12/89*	No. 18	Fordham	W 68-60	7-2	Rose Hill Gymnasium; Bronx, NY
12/16/89*	No. 18	Manhattan	W 68-52	8-2	Alumni Hall; Queens, NY
12/23/89*	No. 19	Niagara	W 83-51	9-2	Alumni Hall; Queens, NY
12/27/89*	No. 17	Howard	W 77-65	10-2	Alumni Hall; Queens, NY
12/29/89*	No. 17	Davidson	W 83-65	11-2	Alumni Hall; Queens, NY
01/02/90	No. 16	Connecticut	W 93-62	12-2 (1-0)	Alumni Hall; Queens, NY
01/06/90	No. 16	at Boston College	W 77-65	13-2 (2-0)	Silvio O. Conte Forum; Chestnut Hill, MA
01/10/90	No. 15	at No. 6 Syracuse	L 72-81	13-3 (2-1)	Carrier Dome; Syracuse, NY
01/13/90	No. 15	Pittsburgh	W 71-70	14-3 (3-1)	Madison Square Garden; New York, NY
01/16/90	No. 15	at Villanova	W 64-58	15-3 (4-1)	The Spectrum; Philadelphia, PA
01/20/90	No. 15	Boston College	W 65-59	16-3 (5-1)	Alumni Hall; Queens, NY
01/24/90	No. 15	at Providence	W 83-75	17-3 (6-1)	Providence Civic Center; Providence, RI
01/27/90	No. 15	at No. 20 Connecticut	L 58-72	17-4 (6-2)	Gampel Pavilion; Storrs, CT
01/29/90	No. 15	No. 11 Syracuse	L 65-70	17-5 (6-3)	Madison Square Garden; New York, NY
02/03/90	No. 18	No. 6 Georgetown	L 67-74	17-6 (6-4)	Madison Square Garden; New York, NY
02/06/90*	No. 24	Rutgers	W 89-77	18-6	Madison Square Garden; New York, NY
02/10/90	No. 24	Villanova	W 83-69	19-6 (7-4)	Madison Square Garden; New York, NY
02/14/90	No. 24	at Seton Hall	W 90-81 ^{OT}	20-6 (8-4)	Meadowlands Arena; East Rutherford, NJ
02/17/90	No. 24	Providence	L 74-77	20-7 (8-5)	Alumni Hall; Queens, NY
02/21/90		at No. 5 Georgetown	W 63-62	21-7 (9-5)	Capital Centre; Landover, MD
02/24/90*		DePaul	W 77-74	22-7	Madison Square Garden; New York, NY
02/26/90		at Pittsburgh	W 76-75	23-7 (10-5)	Pittsburgh Civic Arena; Pittsburgh, PA
03/02/90		Seton Hall	L 65-71	23-8 (10-6)	Alumni Hall; Queens, NY
Big East tournament
03/09/90		Villanova; Big East tournament Quarterfinal	L 60-70	23-9	Madison Square Garden; New York, NY
NCAA tournament
03/16/90		vs. (11) Temple; NCAA First Round	W 81-65	24-9	Omni Coliseum; Atlanta, GA
03/18/90		vs. No. 15 (3) Duke; NCAA Second Round	L 72-76	24-10	Omni Coliseum; Atlanta, GA
*Non-conference game. ^{#}Rankings from AP Poll. (#) Tournament seedings in parentheses.

== Rankings ==
Ranking movements Legend: ██ Increase in ranking ██ Decrease in ranking — = Not ranked
	Week																	
Poll	Pre	1	2	3	4	5	6	7	8	9	10	11	12	13	14	15	16	Final
AP	25	20	15	18	19	17	16	15	15	15	18	24	24	—	—	—	—	—
Coaches	—	—	—	—	19	—	—	16	17	17	19	—	—	—	—	—	—	—

== Team players drafted into the NBA ==
Round	Pick	Player	NBA club
1	21	Jayson Williams	Phoenix Suns, traded to Philadelphia 76ers
