= Chris Smith (basketball, born 1970) =

American basketball player

Personal information
- Born: May 17, 1970 (age 56) Bridgeport, Connecticut, U.S.
- Listed height: 6 ft 3 in (1.91 m)
- Listed weight: 190 lb (86 kg)

Career information
- High school: Kolbe Cathedral (Bridgeport, Connecticut)
- College: UConn (1988–1992)
- NBA draft: 1992: 2nd round, 34th overall pick
- Drafted by: Minnesota Timberwolves
- Playing career: 1992–2000
- Position: Point guard
- Number: 3

Career history
- 1992–1995: Minnesota Timberwolves
- 1995–1996: Cáceres
- 1996: Capitalinos de San Juan
- 1996–1997: Limoges CSP
- 1997–1998: Grand Rapids Hoops
- 1998: La Crosse Bobcats
- 1998: Maccabi Ra'anana
- 1999: Fort Wayne Fury
- 1999: Rockford Lightning
- 1999–2000: Sioux Falls Skyforce

Career highlights
- First-team All-Big East (1992); Third-team Parade All-American (1988)

Career NBA statistics
- Points: 1,140 (5.1 ppg)
- Rebounds: 291 (1.3 rpg)
- Assists: 627 (2.8 apg)
- Stats at NBA.com
- Stats at Basketball Reference
Medals
Men's basketball
Representing United States
FIBA World Championship
Bronze medal – third place	1990 Argentina	National team
Goodwill Games
Silver medal – second place	1990 Seattle	National team

Christopher Gerard Smith (born May 17, 1970) is an American former professional basketball player who was a point guard.

== Basketball career ==
Born in Bridgeport, Connecticut, Smith played collegiately at the University of Connecticut. He left the Huskies after scoring 2,145 points in his four years, an all-time record (this included another record, 1,140 points in Big East Conference history), and also led the team in career three-point field goals with 242, being one of only two UConn players to score at least 500 points in three different seasons.

A member of the UConn Basketball All Century Team, Smith was also nominated for the John Wooden Award, was named a McDonald's All American and was a member of an All-Big East first team. He played for the US national team in the 1990 FIBA World Championship, winning the bronze medal.

Smith was selected in the second round (34th overall) of the 1992 NBA draft by the Minnesota Timberwolves. He played three seasons (224 total games) with the team, averaging 5.1 points, 2.8 assists, 1.3 rebounds and .5 steals per game.

He continued to play for various franchises in the Continental Basketball Association and Europe until 2000, when a series of injuries transitioned his career to sales and financial services. He received a B.A. in business administration, going on to work as a business development officer for both the People's Bank and its insurance subsidiary, Beardsley, Brown & Bassett.

== Personal life ==
Smith son, Christopher Smith Jr. is now the assistant coach of Indiana Wesleyan University. Smith is cousin of another basketball player, and point guard, Mario Chalmers, who also played in the National Basketball Association, notably with the Miami Heat.
