= Derrick Coleman =

American basketball player (born 1967)

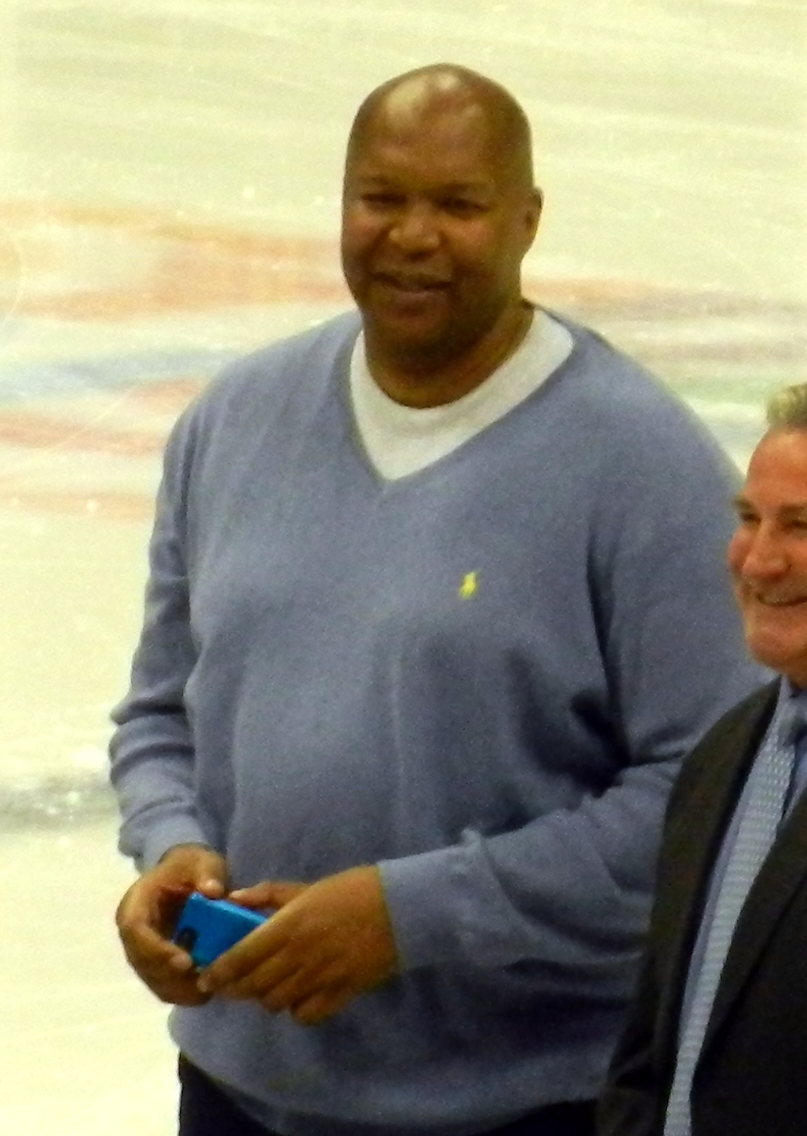
- Coleman in 2014

Personal information
- Born: June 21, 1967 (age 59) Mobile, Alabama, U.S.
- Listed height: 6 ft 10 in (2.08 m)
- Listed weight: 270 lb (122 kg)

Career information
- High school: Northern (Detroit, Michigan)
- College: Syracuse (1986–1990)
- NBA draft: 1990: 1st round, 1st overall pick
- Drafted by: New Jersey Nets
- Playing career: 1990–2005
- Position: Power forward / center
- Number: 44

Career history
- 1990–1995: New Jersey Nets
- 1995–1998: Philadelphia 76ers
- 1999–2001: Charlotte Hornets
- 2001–2004: Philadelphia 76ers
- 2004–2005: Detroit Pistons

Career highlights
- NBA All-Star (1994); 2× All-NBA Third Team (1993, 1994); NBA Rookie of the Year (1991); NBA All-Rookie First Team (1991); Consensus first-team All-American (1990); Second-team All-American – UPI (1989); Third-team All-American – NABC (1989); Big East Player of the Year (1990); 3× First-team All-Big East (1988–1990); Third-team All-Big East (1987); No. 44 retired by Syracuse Orange; McDonald's All-American (1986)

Career NBA statistics
- Points: 12,884 (16.5 ppg)
- Rebounds: 7,232 (9.3 rpg)
- Blocks: 1,051 (1.3 bpg)
- Stats at NBA.com
- Stats at Basketball Reference
Medals
Representing United States
FIBA World Championship
Gold medal – first place	1994 Canada	National team

Derrick Demetrius Coleman (born June 21, 1967) is an American former professional basketball player. Coleman attended Syracuse University and was selected first overall in the 1990 NBA draft by the New Jersey Nets.

Throughout his career, the left-handed Coleman was an effective low post scorer, averaging 16.5 points and 9.3 rebounds. He enjoyed his best years as a member of the New Jersey Nets, where he averaged 19.8 points and 10.6 rebounds per game. When Coleman entered the NBA, he was compared to elite power forwards such as Karl Malone and Charles Barkley, and expected to put up similar numbers, only with the added ability to shoot from three-point range. Coleman made the 1994 NBA All-Star team, but his career was overshadowed by numerous injuries and attitude problems. Sports Illustrated once remarked that "Coleman could have been the best power forward ever; instead he played just well enough to ensure his next paycheck."

As of 2007, he was working as a developer and entrepreneur in Detroit. He has also appeared as an occasional studio analyst for NBA TV's "NBA Gametime Live" coverage.

== Early life ==
Coleman was born in Mobile, Alabama, but grew up and attended high school in Detroit.

== College career ==
Coleman joined the Orangemen (Note: Syracuse did not change its nickname to "Orange" until the 2004–05 school year.) in the 1986–87 season and was a prototypical Big East Conference power forward for the Orange. Head coach Jim Boeheim said no player in Syracuse's basketball history had more impact than Coleman.

Coleman was selected to first team All-Big East selection in his sophomore and junior seasons, and as a senior, he was named the Big East Player of the Year. He finished as the NCAA's top modern-day rebounder and the school's career scoring leader.

Coleman's Syracuse number 44 jersey was retired on March 5, 2006.

== NBA career ==
Coleman was the first overall pick in the 1990 NBA draft after a successful college career. He had a solid rookie season and won the NBA Rookie of the Year Award in 1991.

Coleman improved during the 1991–92 season, averaging close to 20 points and 10 rebounds a game. The Nets were an up-and-coming team as well, with young players like Coleman, Kenny Anderson, Chris Morris and Mookie Blaylock teaming up with solid veteran players like Sam Bowie, Chris Dudley, Terry Mills and Dražen Petrović. The addition of coach Chuck Daly, who won two NBA championships with the Detroit Pistons as head coach, was enough to get the Nets a winning record and into the playoffs during the 1992–93 season. The 1993–94 season was the peak for Coleman and the Nets during his time with the team. The Nets made it to the playoffs for the third straight season, while Coleman averaged his second straight 20 points, 10 rebounds season and was selected to represent the Nets in the All-Star game along with teammate Kenny Anderson. In 1995, the Nets traded Coleman, Rex Walters, and Sean Higgins to the Philadelphia 76ers for Shawn Bradley, Tim Perry, and Greg Graham.

During a 1995 game featuring Coleman's Nets and rival Karl Malone's Utah Jazz, Coleman controversially referred to Malone as an 'Uncle Tom'.

In 1999, Coleman signed with the Charlotte Hornets. In 2001, he was reacquired by the Philadelphia 76ers in a three-team trade involving the Golden State Warriors, where the Hornets acquired Chris Porter, Robert Traylor, George Lynch, and Jérôme Moïso. During his time as a Sixer, he became a mentor to budding superstar Allen Iverson.

In 2004, Coleman and Amal McCaskill were traded to the Detroit Pistons for Corliss Williamson. The 2004–05 season would be Coleman's last, as he was cut by the team in January 2005. He was one of nine NBA players that faced suspension for his role in the infamous November 2004 Pacers–Pistons brawl. He served a one-game suspension for coming off the bench during the altercation at the scorer's table.

Coleman is one of only four players in NBA history to record a five-by-five in a game with at least 20 points and 10 rebounds (the other being Hakeem Olajuwon, Draymond Green and Victor Wembanyama.)

== National team career ==
Coleman played for the US national team in the 1994 FIBA World Championship, winning the gold medal.

== Post NBA ==
Coleman purchased a home in Franklin Lakes, New Jersey, where he resided until 2010, when he moved to Detroit. After the water crisis began in Flint, Michigan, Coleman drove 65 miles daily to bring residents clean bottled water and eating utensils, which they did not have access to.

== NBA career statistics ==
Legend
GP	Games played	GS	Games started	MPG	Minutes per game
FG%	Field goal percentage	3P%	3-point field goal percentage	FT%	Free throw percentage
RPG	Rebounds per game	APG	Assists per game	SPG	Steals per game
BPG	Blocks per game	PPG	Points per game	**Bold**	Career high

=== Regular season ===
Year	Team	GP	GS	MPG	FG%	3P%	FT%	RPG	APG	SPG	BPG	PPG
1990–91	New Jersey	74	68	35.2	.467	.342	.731	10.3	2.2	1.0	1.3	18.4
1991–92	New Jersey	65	58	34.0	**.504**	.303	.763	9.5	3.2	0.8	1.5	19.8
1992–93	New Jersey	76	73	36.3	.460	.232	.808	11.2	**3.6**	**1.2**	1.7	**20.7**
1993–94	New Jersey	**77**	**77**	36.1	.447	.314	.774	**11.3**	3.4	0.9	**1.8**	20.2
1994–95	New Jersey	56	54	**37.6**	.424	.233	.767	10.6	3.3	0.6	1.7	20.5
1995–96	Philadelphia	11	11	26.7	.407	.333	.625	6.5	2.8	0.4	0.9	11.2
1996–97	Philadelphia	57	54	36.9	.435	.269	.745	10.1	3.4	0.9	1.3	18.1
1997–98	Philadelphia	59	58	36.2	.411	.265	.772	9.9	2.5	0.8	1.2	17.6
1998–99	Charlotte	37	29	31.8	.414	.212	.753	8.9	2.1	0.6	1.1	13.1
1999–2000	Charlotte	74	64	31.7	.456	.362	.785	8.5	2.4	0.5	**1.8**	16.7
2000–01	Charlotte	34	3	20.1	.380	**.392**	.685	5.4	1.1	0.3	0.6	8.1
2001–02	Philadelphia	58	58	35.9	.450	.337	.815	8.8	1.7	0.7	0.9	15.1
2002–03	Philadelphia	64	35	27.2	.448	.328	.784	7.0	1.4	0.8	1.1	9.4
2003–04	Philadelphia	34	30	24.8	.413	.222	.754	5.6	1.4	0.7	0.8	8.0
2004–05	Detroit	5	0	10.0	.214	.000	**1.000**	3.0	0.0	0.0	0.0	1.8
Career		781	672	33.2	.447	.295	.769	9.3	2.5	0.8	1.3	16.5
All-Star		1	1	18.0	.167	.000	–	3.0	1.0	1.0	1.0	2.0

=== Playoffs ===
Year	Team	GP	GS	MPG	FG%	3P%	FT%	RPG	APG	SPG	BPG	PPG
1992	New Jersey	4	4	40.5	.486	.167	.762	11.3	**5.3**	**1.8**	1.0	22.3
1993	New Jersey	5	5	**45.0**	**.532**	.417	.806	13.4	4.6	1.2	2.6	**26.8**
1994	New Jersey	4	4	43.3	.397	**.556**	.780	**14.3**	2.5	0.5	1.3	24.5
2000	Charlotte	4	4	42.3	.474	.313	.786	12.5	3.5	0.8	**3.0**	20.3
2001	Charlotte	5	0	17.6	.265	.250	.778	5.0	1.2	0.8	0.4	5.4
2002	Philadelphia	5	5	38.2	.524	.308	.800	9.2	2.0	0.2	1.4	12.8
2003	Philadelphia	**12**	**12**	37.4	.500	.400	**.872**	8.0	2.0	0.6	1.3	13.6
Career		39	34	37.4	.472	.351	.806	9.9	2.8	0.8	1.5	16.8

== See also ==
- List of NCAA Division I men's basketball players with 2000 points and 1000 rebounds
- List of NCAA Division I men's basketball career rebounding leaders
