= Stephen Thompson (basketball) =

American basketball player and coach (born 1968)

Cal State Los Angeles Golden Eagles
- Title: Assistant coach
- League: CCAA

Personal information
- Born: December 2, 1968 (age 57) Los Angeles, California, U.S.
- Listed height: 6 ft 4 in (1.93 m)
- Listed weight: 185 lb (84 kg)

Career information
- High school: Crenshaw (Los Angeles, California)
- College: Syracuse (1986–1990)
- NBA draft: 1990: undrafted
- Playing career: 1990–2001
- Position: Shooting guard
- Number: 5
- Coaching career: 2002–present

Career history

Playing
- 1990–1991: Rapid City Thrillers
- 1991–1992: Oklahoma City Cavalry
- 1992: Orlando Magic
- 1992: Sacramento Kings
- 1992–1993: La Crosse Catbirds
- 1992–1993: BC Oostende
- 1993: Chorale Roanne Basket
- 1993–1994: Rochester Renegade
- 1994: Magic Johnson All-Stars
- 1994–1995: Grand Rapids Mackers
- 1995: Red Bull Energy Kings PBA
- 1995-1996: Hapoel Gvat/Yagur B.C.
- 1996-1999: Mitsui Falcons
- 1999-2000: Alvark Tokyo
- 2000–2001: San Diego Wildfire

Coaching
- 2002–2005: Cal State Los Angeles (assistant)
- 2005–2014: Cal State Los Angeles
- 2014–2026: Oregon State (assistant)
- 2026-present: Cal State Los Angeles (associate head coach)

Career highlights
- 2× All-CBA Second Team (1991, 1992); CBA Rookie of the Year (1991); CBA All-Rookie Team (1991); CBA scoring champion (1992); JBL All-Star (1996-1997); JBL Scoring Champion (1996-1997); JBL Scoring Champion (1998-1999); 2× Second-team All-Big East (1989, 1990); Second-team Parade All-American (1986); McDonald's All-American (1986)
- Stats at NBA.com
- Stats at Basketball Reference
Medals
Men's basketball
Representing United States
Summer Universiade
Gold medal – first place	1989 Duisburg	National team
FIBA U19 World Championship
Silver medal – second place	1987 Bormio	National team

Stephen M. Thompson Sr. (born December 2, 1968) is an American college basketball coach and former professional player who is an assistant coach at Cal State Los Angeles.

Born in Los Angeles, Thompson attended Crenshaw High School and then Syracuse University, where he was named the Big East's Scholar Athlete of the Year. He played briefly in the NBA during the 1991-92 season for the Sacramento Kings (23 games) and Orlando Magic (one game).

Thompson played in the Continental Basketball Association (CBA) for the Rapid City Thrillers, Oklahoma City Cavalry, La Crosse Catbirds, Rochester Renegade and Grand Rapids Mackers from 1990 to 1995. He was selected as the CBA Rookie of the Year in 1991 and named to the All-CBA Second Team in 1991 and 1992.

He was selected to the Syracuse Men's Basketball All-Century Team in 2000.

Thompson was appointed head coach of the California State University, Los Angeles men's basketball team for the 2005–06 season after working as an assistant since 2002.

He joined the coaching staff of the Oregon State University men's basketball program in 2014 as an assistant coach.

In 2022, Thompson became the new assistant Athletic Director- Player Development, before returning to his role as assistant coach in the 2023–24 season.
