= 1989–90 South Florida Bulls men's basketball team =

American college basketball season

1989–90 South Florida Bulls men's basketball

Sun Belt tournament champions

NCAA tournament
- Conference: Sun Belt Conference
- Record: 20–11 (9–5 Sun Belt)
- Head coach: Bobby Paschal (4th season)
- Assistant coaches: Bobby Bowman; Dennis Donaldson; Tommy Tonelli
- Home arena: USF Sun Dome

1989–90 Sun Belt Conference men's basketball standings
	Conf.				Overall
Team	W		L	PCT	W		L	PCT
UAB	12	–	2	.857	22	–	9	.710
South Florida †	9	–	5	.643	20	–	11	.645
Old Dominion	7	–	7	.500	14	–	14	.500
Western Kentucky	7	–	7	.500	13	–	17	.433
UNC Charlotte	6	–	8	.429	16	–	14	.533
Jacksonville	5	–	9	.357	13	–	16	.448
South Alabama	5	–	9	.357	11	–	17	.393
VCU	5	–	9	.357	11	–	17	.393
† 1990 Sun Belt Conference tournament winner Rankings from AP Poll

The 1989–90 South Florida Bulls men's basketball team represented the University of South Florida Bulls in the 1989–90 NCAA Division I men's basketball season. This was the 19th season in school history. The team was coached by Bobby Paschal in his fourth year at the school, and USF played its home games in the USF Sun Dome. The Bulls finished the season 20–11, 9–5 in Sun Belt play, and won the Sun Belt tournament to receive an automatic bid to the NCAA tournament – the first in school history. USF lost to Arizona in the first round.

== Roster ==
1989–90 South Florida Bulls men's basketball team
Players
Coaches

Pos.	#	Name	Height	Weight	Year	Hometown
G	0	Marvin Taylor	6 ft 1 in (1.85 m)	—	Jr	Yazoo City, MS
G	3	Jay Smith	6 ft 4 in (1.93 m)	—	Jr	Tampa, FL
G/F	5	Fred Lewis	6 ft 7 in (2.01 m)	220 lb (100 kg)	So	Tampa, FL
F	10	Steve Williams	6 ft 5 in (1.96 m)	—	Jr	Hallandale, FL
G	11	Tony Armstrong	6 ft 1 in (1.85 m)	—	Jr	Haines City, FL
G	13	Andre Crenshaw	6 ft 2 in (1.88 m)	—	Sr	Montgomery, AL
G	22	Maurice Webster	6 ft 1 in (1.85 m)	—	Jr	Pensacola, FL
G	31	Radenko Dobraš	6 ft 7 in (2.01 m)	185 lb (84 kg)	So	Banja Luka, Yugoslavia
F	32	Bobby Russell	6 ft 5 in (1.96 m)	—	So	Fort Lauderdale, FL
C	34	Hakim Shahid	6 ft 7 in (2.01 m)	—	Sr	Fort Lauderdale, FL
F	43	Chris Risey	6 ft 8 in (2.03 m)	—	Jr	New Orleans, LA

Head coach

- Bobby Paschal

Assistant coach(es)

- Bobby Bowman
- Dennis Donaldson
- Tommy Tonelli
- Rodney Tention (graduate assistant)

Legend

- (C) Team captain
- (S) Suspended
- (I) Ineligible
- (W) Walk-on
- Injured
- Current redshirt

== Schedule and results ==
Date time, TV	Rank^{#}	Opponent^{#}	Result	Record	Site city, state
Regular season
Nov 27, 1989*		Florida International	W 94–80	1–0	Sun Dome; Tampa, Florida
Dec 2, 1989*		Bethune-Cookman	W 88–72	2–0	Sun Dome; Tampa, Florida
Dec 5, 1989*		Stetson	W 68–54	3–0	Sun Dome; Tampa, Florida
Dec 9, 1989*		at Florida International	W 80–58	4–0	U.S. Century Bank Arena; Miami, Florida
Dec 16, 1989*		Florida State	L 72–78	4–1	Sun Dome; Tampa, Florida
Dec 19, 1989*		Augusta State	W 99–77	5–1	Sun Dome; Tampa, Florida
Dec 23, 1989*		at Florida	L 54–91	5–2	Stephen C. O'Connell Center; Gainesville, Florida
Dec 28, 1989*		Western Carolina; Tampa Tribune Holiday Invitational	W 78–67	6–2	Sun Dome; Tampa, Florida
Dec 29, 1989*		Houston; Tampa Tribune Holiday Invitational	L 78–87	6–3	Sun Dome; Tampa, Florida
Jan 4, 1990		at UNC Charlotte	W 89–86	7–3 (1–0)	Bojangles Coliseum; Charlotte, North Carolina
Jan 6, 1990*		Miami (FL)	W 93–77	8–3	Sun Dome; Tampa, Florida
Jan 8, 1990		Alabama-Birmingham	L 66–83	8–4 (1–1)	Sun Dome; Tampa, Florida
Jan 13, 1990		South Alabama	W 98–74	9–4 (2–1)	Sun Dome; Tampa, Florida
Jan 15, 1990*		Central Connecticut State	W 89–59	10–4	Sun Dome; Tampa, Florida
Jan 18, 1990		at South Alabama	L 79–81	10–5 (2–2)	Jaguar Gymnasium; Mobile, Alabama
Jan 23, 1990*		at Maryland	L 66–84	10–6	Cole Fieldhouse; College Park, Maryland
Jan 27, 1990		UNC Charlotte	W 79–74	11–6 (3–2)	Sun Dome; Tampa, Florida
Jan 29, 1990		at VCU	W 68–65	12–6 (4–2)	Richmond Coliseum; Richmond, Virginia
Feb 1, 1990		Jacksonville	W 96–84	13–6 (5–2)	Sun Dome; Tampa, Florida
Feb 3, 1990*		at Western Kentucky	W 59–58	14–6 (6–2)	E.A. Diddle Arena; Bowling Green, Kentucky
Feb 7, 1990*		Old Dominion	W 94–93	15–6 (7–2)	Sun Dome; Tampa, Florida
Feb 10, 1990		at Alabama-Birmingham	L 64–82	15–7 (7–3)	UAB Arena; Birmingham, Alabama
Feb 15, 1990		at Old Dominion	L 56–75	15–8 (7–4)	Norfolk Scope; Norfolk, Virginia
Feb 17, 1990		VCU	W 75–66	16–8 (8–4)	Sun Dome; Tampa, Florida
Feb 19, 1990		Western Kentucky	W 80–70	17–8 (9–4)	Sun Dome; Tampa, Florida
Feb 22, 1990		at Jacksonville	L 84–86	17–9 (9–5)	Jacksonville Memorial Coliseum; Jacksonville, Florida
Feb 24, 1990*		at Miami (FL)	L 73–81	17–10	Miami Arena; Miami, Florida
Sun Belt tournament
Mar 3, 1990*	(2)	vs. (7) South Alabama; Sun Belt Tournament Quarterfinal	W 80–78	18–10	Birmingham–Jefferson Civic Center; Birmingham, Alabama
Mar 4, 1990*	(2)	vs. (6) Jacksonville; Sun Belt Tournament Semifinal	W 86–59	19–10	Birmingham–Jefferson Civic Center; Birmingham, Alabama
Mar 5, 1990*	(2)	vs. (5) UNC Charlotte; Sun Belt tournament championship	W 81–74	20–10	Birmingham–Jefferson Civic Center; Birmingham, Alabama
NCAA tournament
Mar 16, 1990*	(15 W)	vs. (2 W) No. 14 Arizona	L 67–79	20–11	Long Beach Arena; Long Beach, California
*Non-conference game. ^{#}Rankings from AP Poll. (#) Tournament seedings in parentheses. W=West.
