= Dobras =

Dobras is a surname. Notable people with the surname include:

- Kristijan Dobras (born 1992), Austrian footballer
- Radenko Dobraš (born 1968), Serbian basketball player
