= 1989–90 Washington State Cougars men's basketball team =

American college basketball season

1989–90 Washington State Cougars men's basketball
- Conference: Pacific-10
- Record: 7–22 (1–17 Pac-10)
- Head coach: Kelvin Sampson (3rd season)
- Home arena: Beasley Coliseum

1989–90 Pacific-10 Conference men's basketball standings
	Conf.				Overall
Team	W		L	PCT	W		L	PCT
No. 22 Oregon State	15	–	3	.833	22	–	7	.759
No. 14 Arizona †	15	–	3	.833	25	–	7	.781
California	12	–	6	.667	22	–	10	.688
UCLA	11	–	7	.611	22	–	11	.667
Oregon	10	–	8	.556	15	–	14	.517
Stanford	9	–	9	.500	18	–	12	.600
USC	6	–	12	.333	12	–	16	.429
Arizona State	6	–	12	.333	15	–	16	.484
Washington	5	–	13	.278	11	–	17	.393
Washington State	1	–	17	.056	7	–	22	.241
† Conference tournament winner As of April 15, 1990; Rankings from AP Poll

The 1989–90 Washington State Cougars men's basketball team represented Washington State University for the 1989–90 NCAA Division I men's basketball season. Led by third-year head coach Kelvin Sampson, the Cougars were members of the Pacific-10 Conference and played their home games on campus at Beasley Coliseum in Pullman, Washington.

The Cougars were 7–21 overall in the regular season and 1–17 in conference play, last in the standings. The sole Pac-10 victory was by one point over USC on November 30, and the season's last win was on December 29.

At the conference tournament, the Cougars met seventh seed USC in the first round and lost by seventeen points, ending the season on an eighteen-game losing streak.

== Postseason result ==
Date time, TV	Rank^{#}	Opponent^{#}	Result	Record	Site (attendance) city, state
Pacific-10 Tournament
Thu, March 8; 8:00 pm	(10)	vs. (7) USC; First round	L 68–85	7–22	University Activity Center (7,773); Tempe, Arizona
*Non-conference game. ^{#}Rankings from AP poll. (#) Tournament seedings in parentheses. All times are in Pacific time.
