= 1990 WAC men's basketball tournament =

- Classification: Division I
- Season: 1989–90
- Teams: 9
- Site: Special Events Center; El Paso, TX
- Champions: UTEP (4th title)
- Winning coach: Don Haskins (4th title)
- MVP: Greg Foster (UTEP)

1989–90 WAC men's basketball standings
	Conf.				Overall
Team	W		L	PCT	W		L	PCT
Colorado State	11	–	5	.688	21	–	9	.700
BYU	11	–	5	.688	21	–	9	.700
Hawaii	10	–	6	.625	25	–	10	.714
UTEP †	10	–	6	.625	21	–	11	.656
New Mexico	9	–	7	.563	20	–	14	.588
Wyoming	7	–	9	.438	15	–	14	.517
Utah	7	–	9	.438	16	–	14	.533
San Diego State	4	–	12	.250	13	–	18	.419
Air Force	3	–	13	.188	12	–	20	.375
† 1990 WAC tournament winner Rankings from AP Poll

The 1990 Western Athletic Conference men's basketball tournament was held March 7–10 at the Special Events Center at the University of Texas at El Paso in El Paso, Texas.

UTEP defeated Hawaii in the championship game, 75–58, to clinch their fourth overall, and second consecutive, WAC men's tournament championship

The Miners, in turn, received an automatic bid to the 1990 NCAA tournament. They were joined in the tournament by the WAC regular season co-champions Colorado State and BYU, who both earned at-large bids (both teams lost their WAC quarterfinal games to lower seeds).

== Format ==
The tournament field remained fixed at nine teams, and teams were again seeded based on regular season conference records. All teams were entered into the quarterfinal round with the exception of the two lowest-seeded teams, who played in the preliminary first round to determine who would then play against the tournament's top seed.

== Bracket ==
First round Wednesday, March 7
9	Air Force	70
8	San Diego State	64

Quarterfinals; Wednesday, March 7 Thursday, March 8
1	Colorado State	51
9	Air Force	58
5	New Mexico	61
4	UTEP	78
3	Hawaii	66
6	Wyoming	63
7	Utah	62
2	BYU	61

Semifinals; Friday, March 9
9	Air Force	54
4	UTEP	57
3	Hawaii	66
7	Utah	60

Championship; Saturday, March 10
4	UTEP	75
3	Hawaii	58
