= 1989–90 UTEP Miners men's basketball team =

American college basketball season

1989–90 UTEP Miners men's basketball

WAC tournament champions

NCAA tournament, first round
- Conference: Western Athletic Conference
- Record: 21–11 (10–6 WAC)
- Head coach: Don Haskins (29th season)
- Home arena: Special Events Center

1989–90 WAC men's basketball standings
	Conf.				Overall
Team	W		L	PCT	W		L	PCT
Colorado State	11	–	5	.688	21	–	9	.700
BYU	11	–	5	.688	21	–	9	.700
Hawaii	10	–	6	.625	25	–	10	.714
UTEP †	10	–	6	.625	21	–	11	.656
New Mexico	9	–	7	.563	20	–	14	.588
Wyoming	7	–	9	.438	15	–	14	.517
Utah	7	–	9	.438	16	–	14	.533
San Diego State	4	–	12	.250	13	–	18	.419
Air Force	3	–	13	.188	12	–	20	.375
† 1990 WAC tournament winner Rankings from AP Poll

The 1989–90 UTEP Miners men's basketball team represented the University of Texas at El Paso in the 1989–90 college basketball season. The team was led by head coach Don Haskins. The Miners finished 21–11 (10–6 in WAC), won the WAC tournament championship, and gained an automatic bid to the NCAA tournament.

== Roster ==
1989–90 UTEP Miners men's basketball team
Players
Coaches

Pos.	#	Name	Height	Weight	Year	Hometown
F	34	Antonio Davis	6 ft 9 in (2.06 m)	220 lb (100 kg)	Sr	Oakland, California
F/C	44	Greg Foster	6 ft 11 in (2.11 m)	230 lb (104 kg)	Sr	Oakland, California

Head coach

- Don Haskins

Assistant coach(es)

Legend

- (C) Team captain
- (S) Suspended
- (I) Ineligible
- (W) Walk-on
- Injured
- Current redshirt

== Schedule and results ==
Date time, TV	Rank^{#}	Opponent^{#}	Result	Record	Site city, state
Regular season
WAC tournament
Mar 7, 1990*	(4)	(5) New Mexico; Quarterfinals	W 78–61	19–10	Special Events Center; El Paso, Texas
Mar 9, 1990*	(4)	(9) Air Force; Semifinals	W 57–54	20–10	Special Events Center; El Paso, Texas
Mar 10, 1990*	(4)	(3) Hawaii; Championship	W 75–58	21–10	Special Events Center; El Paso, Texas
NCAA tournament
Mar 16, 1990*	(11 SE)	vs. (6 SE) No. 20 Minnesota; First Round	L 61–64 ^{OT}	21–11	Richmond Coliseum; Richmond, Virginia
*Non-conference game. ^{#}Rankings from AP Poll. (#) Tournament seedings in parentheses. W=West.

== NBA draft ==
Round	Pick	Player	NBA Club
2	35	Greg Foster	Washington Bullets
2	45	Antonio Davis	Indiana Pacers
