= 1989–90 California Golden Bears men's basketball team =

American college basketball season

1989–90 California Golden Bears men's basketball

NCAA tournament, second round
- Conference: Pacific-10 Conference
- Record: 22–10 (12–6 Pac-10)
- Head coach: Lou Campanelli (4th season)
- Home arena: Harmon Gym

1989–90 Pacific-10 Conference men's basketball standings
	Conf.				Overall
Team	W		L	PCT	W		L	PCT
No. 22 Oregon State	15	–	3	.833	22	–	7	.759
No. 14 Arizona †	15	–	3	.833	25	–	7	.781
California	12	–	6	.667	22	–	10	.688
UCLA	11	–	7	.611	22	–	11	.667
Oregon	10	–	8	.556	15	–	14	.517
Stanford	9	–	9	.500	18	–	12	.600
USC	6	–	12	.333	12	–	16	.429
Arizona State	6	–	12	.333	15	–	16	.484
Washington	5	–	13	.278	11	–	17	.393
Washington State	1	–	17	.056	7	–	22	.241
† Conference tournament winner As of April 15, 1990; Rankings from AP Poll

The 1989–90 California Golden Bears men's basketball team represented the University of California, Berkeley as a member of the Pacific-10 Conference during the 1989–90 season.

Led by fourth-year head coach Lou Campanelli, the Bears finished the season with a record of 22–10, and a record of 12–6 in the Pac-10, placing them third. The Bears received an at-large bid to the NCAA tournament as No. 9 seed in the East region. After defeating Indiana in the opening round, Cal fell to No. 1 seed Connecticut in the second round.

== Roster ==
1989–90 California Golden Bears men's basketball team
Players	Coaches
Pos. / # / Name / Height / Weight / Year / Hometown; G / / Keith Smith / 6 ft 4 in (1.93 m) / — / Sr	Head coach: Lou Campanelli; Assistant coach(es) Legend: (C) Team captain; (S) Suspended; (I) Ineligible; (W) Walk-on; Injured; Current redshirt

== Schedule and results ==
Date time, TV	Rank^{#}	Opponent^{#}	Result	Record	Site city, state
Non-conference regular season
Nov 15, 1989*		Air Force; Preseason NIT	W 70–49	1–0	Harmon Gym; Berkeley, California
Nov 16, 1989*		at No. 1 UNLV; Preseason NIT	L 81–101	1–1	Thomas & Mack Center; Las Vegas, Nevada
Nov 27, 1989*		Cal Poly Pomona	W 95–72	2–1	Harmon Gym; Berkeley, California
Nov 29, 1989*		Prairie View A&M	W 76–68	3–1	Harmon Gym; Berkeley, California
Dec 2, 1989*		San Francisco	W 83–61	4–1	Harmon Gym; Berkeley, California
Dec 5, 1989*		at U.S. International	W 97–87	5–1	Golden Hall; San Diego, California
Dec 9, 1989*		UC Irvine	W 99–78	6–1	Harmon Gym; Berkeley, California
Dec 20, 1989*		at Purdue	L 55–60	6–2	Mackey Arena; West Lafayette, Indiana
Dec 23, 1989*		Brigham Young	W 85–63	7–2	Harmon Gym; Berkeley, California
Dec 27, 1989*		Columbia	W 98–61	8–2	Harmon Gym; Berkeley, California
Dec 29, 1989*		Cornell	W 82–49	9–2	Harmon Gym; Berkeley, California
Pac-10 regular season
Jan 2, 1990		at No. 19 Arizona	L 70–71	9–3 (0–1)	McKale Center; Tucson, Arizona
Jan 5, 1990		Oregon	W 95–72	10–3 (1–1)	Harmon Gym; Berkeley, California
Jan 7, 1990		No. 23 Oregon State	L 58–64	10–4 (1–2)	Harmon Gym; Berkeley, California
Jan 11, 1990		at Washington State	W 72–67	11–4 (2–2)	Friel Court; Pullman, Washington
Jan 13, 1990		at Washington	W 63–58	12–4 (3–2)	Bank of America Arena; Seattle, Washington
Jan 18, 1990		USC	W 74–60	13–4 (4–2)	Harmon Gym; Berkeley, California
Jan 20, 1990		No. 16 UCLA	L 97–106	13–5 (4–3)	Harmon Gym; Berkeley, California
Jan 25, 1990		Arizona State	W 68–66	14–5 (5–3)	Harmon Gym; Berkeley, California
Feb 1, 1990		at No. 21 Oregon State	L 81–98	14–6 (5–4)	Gill Coliseum; Corvallis, Oregon
Feb 4, 1990		at Oregon	W 79–78	15–6 (6–4)	McArthur Court; Eugene, Oregon
Feb 8, 1990		Washington	W 86–64	16–6 (7–4)	Harmon Gym; Berkeley, California
Feb 10, 1990		Washington State	W 69–51	17–6 (8–4)	Harmon Gym; Berkeley, California
Feb 15, 1990		at No. 23 UCLA	W 79–71	18–6 (9–4)	Pauley Pavilion; Los Angeles, California
Feb 17, 1990		at USC	W 74–70	19–6 (10–4)	L.A. Sports Arena; Los Angeles, California
Feb 21, 1990		No. 21 Arizona	L 68–93	19–7 (10–5)	Harmon Gym; Berkeley, California
Feb 23, 1990		Arizona State	W 69–60	20–7 (11–5)	Harmon Gym; Berkeley, California
Feb 28, 1990		at Stanford	W 66–63	21–7 (12–5)	Maples Pavilion; Stanford, California
Mar 4, 1990		Stanford	L 58–79	21–8 (12–6)	Harmon Gym; Berkeley, California
Pac-10 Tournament
Mar 9, 1990*		vs. Stanford; Pac-10 Tournament Quarterfinal	L 61–77	21–9	Wells Fargo Arena; Tempe, Arizona
NCAA Tournament
Mar 15, 1990*	(9 E)	vs. (8 E) Indiana; First Round	W 65–63	22–9	Hartford Civic Center; Hartford, Connecticut
Mar 17, 1990*	(9 E)	vs. (1 E) No. 4 Connecticut; Second Round	L 54–74	22–10	Hartford Civic Center; Hartford, Connecticut
*Non-conference game. ^{#}Rankings from AP Poll. (#) Tournament seedings in parentheses. E=East. All times are in Pacific Time.
