= 1989–90 UAB Blazers men's basketball team =

American college basketball season

1989–90 UAB Blazers men's basketball

Sun Belt Regular season champions

NCAA tournament
- Conference: Sun Belt Conference
- Record: 22–9 (12–2 Sun Belt)
- Head coach: Gene Bartow (12th season)
- Assistant coach: Murry Bartow (1st season)
- Home arena: UAB Arena

1989–90 Sun Belt Conference men's basketball standings
	Conf.				Overall
Team	W		L	PCT	W		L	PCT
UAB	12	–	2	.857	22	–	9	.710
South Florida †	9	–	5	.643	20	–	11	.645
Old Dominion	7	–	7	.500	14	–	14	.500
Western Kentucky	7	–	7	.500	13	–	17	.433
UNC Charlotte	6	–	8	.429	16	–	14	.533
Jacksonville	5	–	9	.357	13	–	16	.448
South Alabama	5	–	9	.357	11	–	17	.393
VCU	5	–	9	.357	11	–	17	.393
† 1990 Sun Belt Conference tournament winner Rankings from AP Poll

The 1989–90 UAB Blazers men's basketball team represented the University of Alabama at Birmingham as a member of the Sun Belt Conference during the 1989–90 NCAA Division I men's basketball season. This was head coach Gene Bartow's 12th season at UAB, and the Blazers played their home games at UAB Arena. They finished the season 22–9, 12–2 in Sun Belt play and lost in the semifinals of the Sun Belt tournament. They received an at-large bid to the NCAA tournament as No. 10 seed in the East region. The Blazers fell in the opening round to UCLA, 68–56.

== Roster ==
1989–90 UAB Blazers men's basketball team
Players
Coaches

Pos.	#	Name	Height	Weight	Year	Hometown
G	3	Barry Bearden	5 ft 11 in (1.8 m)	175 lb (79 kg)	Sr	Birmingham, Alabama
G	4	Stanley Jackson	6 ft 3 in (1.91 m)	180 lb (82 kg)	Fr	Valley, Alabama
G	13	Andy Kennedy	6 ft 8 in (2.03 m)	195 lb (88 kg)	Jr	Louisville, Mississippi
G	15	JJ Smith	5 ft 11 in (1.8 m)	170 lb (77 kg)	So	Memphis, Tennessee
G	22	Jack Kramer	6 ft 3 in (1.91 m)	195 lb (88 kg)	Jr	Quincy, Illinois
G	23	Elbert Rogers	6 ft 7 in (2.01 m)	240 lb (109 kg)	So	Pascagoula, Mississippi
G	24	George Wilkerson	6 ft 3 in (1.91 m)	195 lb (88 kg)	Fr	Birmingham, Alabama
F	40	Larry Rembert	6 ft 8 in (2.03 m)	240 lb (109 kg)	Sr	Orrville, Alabama
F	50	Doug Turner (redshirt)	6 ft 11 in (2.11 m)	200 lb (91 kg)	Fr	Knob Noster, Missouri
F	52	William DeVaughn	6 ft 9 in (2.06 m)	225 lb (102 kg)	Sr	Birmingham, Alabama
C	53	Alan Ogg	7 ft 2 in (2.18 m)	230 lb (104 kg)	Sr	Mount Olive, Alabama

Head coach

- Gene Bartow

Assistant coach(es)

Legend

- (C) Team captain
- (S) Suspended
- (I) Ineligible
- (W) Walk-on
- Injured
- Current redshirt

Roster
Last update: May 9, 2020

== Schedule and results ==
Date time, TV	Rank^{#}	Opponent^{#}	Result	Record	Site (attendance) city, state
Regular season
Nov 15, 1989*		at Kansas; Preseason NIT	L 83–109	0–1	Allen Fieldhouse (7,025); Lawrence, Kansas
Nov 28, 1989*		Alcorn State	W 104–53	1–1	UAB Arena (9,010); Birmingham, Alabama
Dec 1, 1989*		at Auburn	W 75–65	2–1	Beard–Eaves–Memorial Coliseum (11,718); Auburn, Alabama
Dec 5, 1989*		Oregon	W 79–69	3–1	UAB Arena (7,298); Birmingham, Alabama
Dec 8, 1989*		vs. Georgia Southern; Cougar Classic	W 79–53	4–1	Marriott Center (4,500); Provo, Utah
Dec 9, 1989*		at Brigham Young; Cougar Classic	L 82–98	4–2	Marriott Center (18,097); Provo, Utah
Dec 16, 1989*		at Vanderbilt	L 74–87	4–3	Memorial Gymnasium (13,637); Nashville, Tennessee
Dec 21, 1989*		Penn State; UAB Invitational	W 80–57	5–3	UAB Arena (6,171); Birmingham, Alabama
Dec 22, 1989*		San Diego State; UAB Invitational	W 91–46	6–3	UAB Arena (4,209); Birmingham, Alabama
Dec 29, 1989*		New Hampshire; UAB Classic	W 76–47	7–3	UAB Arena (4,889); Birmingham, Alabama
Dec 30, 1989*		Alabama State; UAB Classic	W 118–85	8–3	UAB Arena (6,319); Birmingham, Alabama
Jan 4, 1990		Jacksonville	W 77–61	9–3 (1–0)	UAB Arena (6,191); Birmingham, Alabama
Jan 6, 1990		at Old Dominion	W 64–61	10–3 (2–0)	Norfolk Scope (5,098); Norfolk, Virginia
Jan 8, 1990		at South Florida	W 83–66	11–3 (3–0)	Sun Dome (4,755); Tampa, Florida
Jan 13, 1990*		at No. 25 Xavier	L 61–82	11–4	Cincinnati Gardens (8,047); Cincinnati, Ohio
Jan 16, 1990		Western Kentucky	W 86–55	12–4 (4–0)	UAB Arena (7,196); Birmingham, Alabama
Jan 18, 1990		at VCU	W 80–59	13–4 (5–0)	Richmond Coliseum (6,208); Richmond, Virginia
Jan 20, 1990		South Alabama	W 85–80	14–4 (6–0)	UAB Arena (8,659); Birmingham, Alabama
Jan 24, 1990		at Jacksonville	L 84–86	14–5 (6–1)	Jacksonville Memorial Coliseum (3,993); Jacksonville, Florida
Jan 27, 1990*		No. 6 Arkansas	L 95–109	14–6	UAB Arena (8,951); Birmingham, Alabama
Feb 1, 1990		at Western Kentucky	W 68–57	15–6 (7–1)	E.A. Diddle Arena (7,700); Bowling Green, Kentucky
Feb 4, 1990		at South Alabama	W 82–75	16–6 (8–1)	Jaguar Gym (6,720); Mobile, Alabama
Feb 8, 1990		VCU	W 74–51	17–6 (9–1)	UAB Arena (8,237); Birmingham, Alabama
Feb 10, 1990		South Florida	W 82–64	18–6 (10–1)	UAB Arena (8,211); Birmingham, Alabama
Feb 15, 1990		at UNC Charlotte	L 72–86	18–7 (10–2)	Bojangles Coliseum (3,427); Charlotte, North Carolina
Feb 17, 1990*		at DePaul	W 74–68	19–7	Rosemont Horizon (10,585); Rosemont, Illinois
Feb 24, 1990		UNC Charlotte	W 93–61	20–7 (11–2)	UAB Arena (8,503); Birmingham, Alabama
Feb 26, 1990		Old Dominion	W 87–72	21–7 (12–2)	UAB Arena (6,511); Birmingham, Alabama
Sun Belt tournament
Mar 3, 1990*	(1)	vs. (8) VCU; Sun Belt Tournament Quarterfinal	W 83–68	22–7	Birmingham-Jefferson Civic Center (9,728); Birmingham, Alabama
Mar 4, 1990*	(1)	vs. (5) UNC Charlotte; Sun Belt Tournament Semifinal	L 57–61	22–8	Birmingham-Jefferson Civic Center (9,105); Birmingham, Alabama
NCAA tournament
Mar 16, 1990*	(10 E)	vs. (7 E) UCLA; First Round	L 56–68	22–9	Omni Coliseum (9,331); Atlanta, Georgia
*Non-conference game. ^{#}Rankings from AP poll. (#) Tournament seedings in parentheses. E=East. All times are in Central Time.
