= 1989–90 Oregon State Beavers men's basketball team =

American college basketball season

1989–90 Oregon State Beavers men's basketball

Pac 10 Regular Season Champions Far West Classic Champions

NCAA tournament, first round
- Conference: Pac-10 Conference

Ranking
- AP: No. 22
- Record: 22–7 (15–3 Pac 10)
- Head coach: Jim Anderson (1st season)
- Home arena: Gill Coliseum

1989–90 Pacific-10 Conference men's basketball standings
	Conf.				Overall
Team	W		L	PCT	W		L	PCT
No. 22 Oregon State	15	–	3	.833	22	–	7	.759
No. 14 Arizona †	15	–	3	.833	25	–	7	.781
California	12	–	6	.667	22	–	10	.688
UCLA	11	–	7	.611	22	–	11	.667
Oregon	10	–	8	.556	15	–	14	.517
Stanford	9	–	9	.500	18	–	12	.600
USC	6	–	12	.333	12	–	16	.429
Arizona State	6	–	12	.333	15	–	16	.484
Washington	5	–	13	.278	11	–	17	.393
Washington State	1	–	17	.056	7	–	22	.241
† Conference tournament winner As of April 15, 1990; Rankings from AP Poll

The 1989–90 Oregon State Beavers men's basketball team represented Oregon State University in Corvallis, Oregon in the 1989–90 season.

Led by first-year head coach Jim Anderson and Pac-10 Player of the Year Gary Payton, the Beavers earned the crown for the Pac 10 regular season. The Beavers were invited to the NCAA tournament, where they lost in the first round to Ball State. This would be the Beavers' last trip to the "Big Dance" until 2016.

After this season, Payton would enter the NBA draft, and begin what would later become a hall of fame NBA career.

== Roster ==
1989–90 Oregon State Beavers men's basketball team
Players
Coaches

Pos.	#	Name	Height	Weight	Year	Previous school	Hometown
G	20	Gary Payton	6 ft 4 in (1.93 m)	180 lb (82 kg)	Sr	Skyline HS	Oakland, California
F	24	Earl Martin	6 ft 5 in (1.96 m)	—	Sr
C	44	Scott Haskin	6 ft 11 in (2.11 m)	250 lb (113 kg)	So	Beaumont HS	Beaumont, California

Head coach

- Jim Anderson (Oregon State)

Assistant coach(es)

Legend

- (C) Team captain
- (S) Suspended
- (I) Ineligible
- (W) Walk-on
- Injured
- Current redshirt

== Schedule and results ==
Date time, TV	Rank^{#}	Opponent^{#}	Result	Record	Site (attendance) city, state
Regular season
Nov 24, 1989*		Marquette	W 71–57	1–0	Gill Coliseum (9,826); Corvallis, OR
Nov 30, 1989		Arizona State	W 87–64	2–0 (1–0)	Gill Coliseum (8,677); Corvallis, OR
Dec 2, 1989		No. 2 Arizona	W 84–61	3–0 (2–0)	Gill Coliseum (10,275); Corvallis, OR
Dec 8, 1989*	No. 20	at No. 16 Memphis State	L 72–78	3–1	Mid-South Coliseum (8,007); Memphis, TN
Dec 10, 1989*	No. 20	at Tennessee	W 96–90 ^{OT}	4–1	Thompson-Boling Arena (7,839); Knoxville, TN
Dec 16, 1989*	No. 23	at Gonzaga	W 82–61	5–1	The Kennel (3,309); Spokane, WA
Dec 19, 1989*	No. 21	Loyola Marymount	L 113–117	5–2	Gill Coliseum (9,183); Corvallis, OR
Dec 22, 1989*	No. 21	Boise State	W 76–42	6–2	Gill Coliseum (8,289); Corvallis, OR
Dec 27, 1989*	No. 23	vs. Boston University; Far West Classic	W 86–66	7–2	(10,490); Portland, OR
Dec 28, 1989*	No. 23	vs. Louisiana Tech; Far West Classic	W 82–81	8–2	(11,015); Portland, OR
Dec 29, 1989*	No. 23	vs. Oregon; Far West Classic	W 71–68	9–2	(12,105); Portland, OR
Jan 5, 1990	No. 23	at Stanford	W 77–76 ^{OT}	10–2 (3–0)	Maples Pavilion (6,623); Stanford, CA
Jan 7, 1990	No. 23	at California	W 64–58	11–2 (4–0)	Harmon Gym (6,578); Berkeley, CA
Jan 13, 1990	No. 22	at Oregon	W 69–67	12–2 (5–0)	McArthur Court (10,063); Eugene, OR
Jan 18, 1990	No. 18	Washington State	W 79–64	13–2 (6–0)	Gill Coliseum (9,814); Corvallis, OR
Jan 20, 1990	No. 18	Washington	W 70–63	14–2 (7–0)	Gill Coliseum (10,400); Corvallis, OR
Jan 25, 1990	No. 17	at USC	W 92–82	15–2 (8–0)	L.A. Sports Arena (2,129); Los Angeles, CA
Jan 27, 1990	No. 17	at No. 23 UCLA	L 80–94	15–3 (8–1)	Pauley Pavilion (12,525); Los Angeles, CA
Feb 1, 1990	No. 21	California	W 98–81	16–3 (9–1)	Gill Coliseum (9,580); Corvallis, OR
Feb 3, 1990	No. 18	Stanford	W 84–70	17–3 (10–1)	Gill Coliseum (10,400); Corvallis, OR
Feb 11, 1990	No. 18	Oregon	W 57–55	18–3 (11–1)	Gill Coliseum (10,400); Corvallis, OR
Feb 15, 1990	No. 16	at Washington	L 57–66	18–4 (11–2)	Hec Edmundson Pavilion (4,534); Seattle, WA
Feb 18, 1990	No. 16	at Washington State	W 83–63	19–4 (12–2)	Friel Court (3,408); Pullman, WA
Feb 22, 1990	No. 17	USC	W 98–94 ^{OT}	20–4 (13–2)	Gill Coliseum (9,878); Corvallis, OR
Feb 24, 1990	No. 17	UCLA	W 83–74	21–4 (14–2)	Gill Coliseum (10,400); Corvallis, OR
Mar 1, 1990	No. 16	at Arizona State	W 73–59	22–4 (15–2)	Wells Fargo Arena (7,188); Tempe, AZ
Mar 3, 1990	No. 16	at No. 23 Arizona	L 60–87	22–5 (15–3)	McKale Center (13,658); Tucson, AZ
Pac-10 Tournament
Mar 9, 1990*	No. 22	at Arizona State; Pac-10 tournament Quarterfinal	L 75–83	22–6	Wells Fargo Arena (4,380); Tempe, AZ
NCAA Tournament
Mar 15, 1990*	(5 W) No. 22	vs. (12 W) Ball State; First Round	L 53–54	22–7	Jon M. Huntsman Center (10,020); Salt Lake City, UT
*Non-conference game. ^{#}Rankings from AP Poll. (#) Tournament seedings in parentheses.

== Awards and honors ==
- Gary Payton – Pac-10 Player of the Year and Consensus First-team All-American
- Jim Anderson – Pac-10 Coach of the Year

== Team players in the 1990 NBA draft ==
Round	Pick	Player	NBA club
1	2	Gary Payton	Seattle SuperSonics
