= 1989–90 BYU Cougars men's basketball team =

American college basketball season

1989–90 BYU Cougars men's basketball

WAC Regular season co-champions Cougar Classic champions

NCAA tournament
- Conference: Western Athletic Conference
- Record: 21–9 (11–5 WAC)
- Head coach: Roger Reid (1st season)
- Home arena: Marriott Center

1989–90 WAC men's basketball standings
	Conf.				Overall
Team	W		L	PCT	W		L	PCT
Colorado State	11	–	5	.688	21	–	9	.700
BYU	11	–	5	.688	21	–	9	.700
Hawaii	10	–	6	.625	25	–	10	.714
UTEP †	10	–	6	.625	21	–	11	.656
New Mexico	9	–	7	.563	20	–	14	.588
Wyoming	7	–	9	.438	15	–	14	.517
Utah	7	–	9	.438	16	–	14	.533
San Diego State	4	–	12	.250	13	–	18	.419
Air Force	3	–	13	.188	12	–	20	.375
† 1990 WAC tournament winner Rankings from AP Poll

The 1989–90 BYU Cougars men's basketball team represented Brigham Young University as a member of the Western Athletic Conference during the 1989–90 basketball season. Led by first-year head coach Roger Reid, the Cougars compiled a record of 21–9 (11–5 WAC) to finish second in the WAC regular season standings. The team played their home games at the Marriott Center in Provo, Utah, and finished with an unblemished record at home (16–0). The Cougars received an at-large bid to the NCAA tournament, making their first appearance under Reid. In the NCAA tournament, BYU lost a tough opening round game to Clemson, 49–47.

== Roster ==
1989–90 BYU Cougars men's basketball team
Players	Coaches
Pos. / # / Name / Height / Weight / Year / Hometown; G / 13 / Andy Toolson / 6 ft 6 in (1.98 m) / 205 lb (93 kg) / Sr / Twin Falls, Idaho	Head coach: Roger Reid; Assistant coach(es) Legend: (C) Team captain; (S) Suspended; (I) Ineligible; (W) Walk-on; Injured; Current redshirt

== Schedule and results ==
Date time, TV	Rank^{#}	Opponent^{#}	Result	Record	Site city, state
Regular Season
Nov 24, 1989*		Siena	W 83–62	1–0	Marriott Center; Provo, Utah
Nov 25, 1989*		Eastern Washington	W 94–84	2–0	Marriott Center; Provo, Utah
Nov 28, 1989*		Weber State	W 81–65	3–0	Marriott Center; Provo, Utah
Nov 30, 1989*		at Utah State	W 71–65	4–0	Dee Glen Smith Spectrum; Logan, Utah
Dec 2, 1989*		at Penn State	L 72–82	4–1	Rec Hall; University Park, Pennsylvania
Dec 5, 1989*		at Arizona State	W 65–64	5–1	Wells Fargo Arena; Tempe, Arizona
Dec 8, 1989*		North Texas; Cougar Classic	W 97–68	6–1	Marriott Center; Provo, Utah
Dec 9, 1989*		Alabama-Birmingham; Cougar Classic	W 98–82	7–1	Marriott Center; Provo, Utah
Dec 12, 1989*		Utah State	W 69–68	8–1	Marriott Center; Provo, Utah
Dec 21, 1989*		Northwestern	W 69–68	9–1	Marriott Center; Provo, Utah
Dec 23, 1989*		at California	L 63–85	9–2	Harmon Gym; Berkeley, California
Jan 4, 1990		at Hawaii	L 71–80	9–3 (0–1)	Neal S. Blaisdell Center; Honolulu, Hawaii
Jan 6, 1990		at San Diego State	W 63–60	10–3 (1–1)	San Diego Sports Arena; San Diego, California
Jan 11, 1990		UTEP	W 69–67	11–3 (2–1)	Marriott Center; Provo, Utah
Jan 13, 1990		New Mexico	W 79–78	12–3 (3–1)	Marriott Center; Provo, Utah
Jan 18, 1990		at Air Force	W 64–56	13–3 (4–1)	Clune Arena; Colorado Springs, Colorado
Jan 20, 1990		at Wyoming	W 65–60	14–3 (5–1)	Arena-Auditorium; Laramie, Wyoming
Jan 25, 1990		Utah	W 65–49	15–3 (6–1)	Marriott Center; Provo, Utah
Jan 27, 1990		Colorado State	W 67–52	16–3 (7–1)	Marriott Center; Provo, Utah
Feb 1, 1990		San Diego State	W 75–58	17–3 (8–1)	Marriott Center; Provo, Utah
Feb 3, 1990		Hawaii	W 68–65	18–3 (9–1)	Marriott Center; Provo, Utah
Feb 7, 1990*		at Tulsa	W 66–64	19–3	Tulsa Convention Center; Tulsa, Oklahoma
Feb 10, 1990		at Utah	L 73–89	19–4 (9–2)	Jon M. Huntsman Center; Salt Lake City, Utah
Feb 15, 1990		at New Mexico	L 51–60	19–5 (9–3)	The Pit; Albuquerque, New Mexico
Feb 17, 1990		at UTEP	L 63–64	19–6 (9–4)	Special Events Center; El Paso, Texas
Feb 22, 1990		Wyoming	W 75–64	20–6 (10–4)	Marriott Center; Provo, Utah
Feb 24, 1990		Air Force	W 67–42	21–6 (11–4)	Marriott Center; Provo, Utah
Mar 1, 1990		at Colorado State	L 57–59	21–7 (11–5)	Moby Arena; Fort Collins, Colorado
WAC Tournament
Mar 8, 1990*	(2)	vs. (7) Utah; Quarterfinals	L 61–62 ^{OT}	21–8	Special Events Center; El Paso, Texas
NCAA Tournament
Mar 15, 1990*	(12 E)	vs. (5 E) No. 17 Clemson	L 47–49	21–9	Hartford Civic Center; Hartford, Connecticut
*Non-conference game. ^{#}Rankings from AP Poll. (#) Tournament seedings in parentheses. E=East.
