= 1990 Pacific-10 Conference men's basketball tournament =

Basketball tournament

- Classification: Division I
- Season: 1989–90
- Teams: 10
- Site: University Activity Center; Tempe, Arizona
- Champions: Arizona (3rd title)
- Winning coach: Lute Olson (3rd title)
- MVP: Jud Buechler (Arizona)
- Attendance: 36,502 (5 sessions)

1989–90 Pacific-10 Conference men's basketball standings
	Conf.				Overall
Team	W		L	PCT	W		L	PCT
No. 22 Oregon State	15	–	3	.833	22	–	7	.759
No. 14 Arizona †	15	–	3	.833	25	–	7	.781
California	12	–	6	.667	22	–	10	.688
UCLA	11	–	7	.611	22	–	11	.667
Oregon	10	–	8	.556	15	–	14	.517
Stanford	9	–	9	.500	18	–	12	.600
USC	6	–	12	.333	12	–	16	.429
Arizona State	6	–	12	.333	15	–	16	.484
Washington	5	–	13	.278	11	–	17	.393
Washington State	1	–	17	.056	7	–	22	.241
† Conference tournament winner As of April 15, 1990; Rankings from AP Poll

The 1990 Pacific-10 Conference men's basketball tournament was played March 8–11 at the University Activity Center in Tempe, Arizona, on the campus of Arizona State University. The final game featured UCLA and Arizona, the only two teams that had won previous Pac-10 tournaments. The champion of the tournament for the third consecutive year was Arizona, which received the Pac-10's automatic bid to the NCAA tournament. The Most Outstanding Player was Jud Buechler of Arizona.

This was the fourth edition of the tournament and all ten teams participated. The tournament was not held for the next eleven seasons, then returned in 2002.

== Bracket ==
Play-in Round; Thursday, March 8
8	Arizona State	57
9	Washington	51
7	USC	85
10	Washington State	68

Quarterfinals; Friday, March 9
1	#22 Oregon State	75
8	Arizona State	83
4	UCLA	94
5	Oregon	76
3	California	61
6	Stanford	77
2	#15 Arizona	80
7	USC	57

Semifinals; Saturday, March 10
8	Arizona State	78
4	UCLA	79
6	Stanford	61
2	#15 Arizona	85

Final; Sunday, March 11
4	UCLA	78
2	#15 Arizona	94

Asterisk denotes overtime period.

== Tournament Notes ==
- Third seeded Arizona, became the first team to win that wasn't a #1 seed, in this tournament's history.
- This was the last tournament held by the conference in the 20th Century.
- This year's tournament had the lowest total attendance ever, and has not been held in the state of Arizona since.
- California and Stanford became the first pair of any arch-rivals ever to meet in a Pac-10 Tournament.
- The final game had a total 172 points scored (94-78) in a record high for a Pac-10/12 final game that still stands.
- Arizona's 56 rebounds vs. USC set a tournament game record, which still stands.
- UCLA and Oregon combined for 94 rebounds (49 and 45), a record for two teams in a tournament game, which still stands.
- Arizona State's Isaac Austin set an individual tournament record for field goal %, making 79.1% (19 of 24 in 3 games), which still stands.
- Oregon had 42 personal fouls in their loss to UCLA, setting a Pac-10 Tournament game record that still stands.
- That game also set the combined personal foul single game record of 68 (42 for Oregon and 26 for UCLA) which also is the most to date.
- Matt Muehlebach of Arizona was a perfect 3 of 3 (100%) for 3 point FGs vs. UCLA. This tied the individual 3 pt. FG% record set in 1987 by Greg Hill (Washington).
- Oregon had their best seed (1) in any Pac-10/12 tournament in this year. This was their only time they have been top-seeded.
- Four teams went on to play in the NCAA Tournament from the conference. The Pac-10 sent Arizona with the automatic bid. UCLA, Oregon St. and California also received at-large bids.

== All tournament team ==
- Jud Buechler, Arizona
- Matt Muehlebach, Arizona
- Adam Keefe, Stanford
- Alex Austin, Arizona State
- Trevor Wilson, UCLA
