= 1989–90 Washington Huskies men's basketball team =

American college basketball season

1989–90 Washington Huskies men's basketball
- Conference: Pacific-10 Conference
- Record: 11–17 (5–13 Pac-10)
- Head coach: Lynn Nance (1st season)
- Assistant coach: Trent Johnson (1st season)
- Home arena: Hec Edmundson Pavilion

1989–90 Pacific-10 Conference men's basketball standings
	Conf.				Overall
Team	W		L	PCT	W		L	PCT
No. 22 Oregon State	15	–	3	.833	22	–	7	.759
No. 14 Arizona †	15	–	3	.833	25	–	7	.781
California	12	–	6	.667	22	–	10	.688
UCLA	11	–	7	.611	22	–	11	.667
Oregon	10	–	8	.556	15	–	14	.517
Stanford	9	–	9	.500	18	–	12	.600
USC	6	–	12	.333	12	–	16	.429
Arizona State	6	–	12	.333	15	–	16	.484
Washington	5	–	13	.278	11	–	17	.393
Washington State	1	–	17	.056	7	–	22	.241
† Conference tournament winner As of April 15, 1990; Rankings from AP Poll

The 1989–90 Washington Huskies men's basketball team represented the University of Washington for the 1989–90 NCAA Division I men's basketball season. Led by first-year head coach Lynn Nance, the Huskies were members of the Pacific-10 Conference and played their home games on campus at Hec Edmundson Pavilion in Seattle, Washington.

The Huskies were 11–16 overall in the regular season and 5–13 in conference play, ninth in the standings. In the Pac-10 tournament in Tempe, Arizona, Washington met host and eighth seed Arizona State in the first round and lost by six points.

Alumnus Nance was hired in April 1989, he was previously the head coach at Saint Mary's.

== Postseason results ==
Date time, TV	Opponent	Result	Record	Site (attendance) city, state
Pacific-10 Tournament
Thu, March 8; 6:00 pm	at (8) Arizona State; First round	L 51–57	11–17	University Activity Center; Tempe, Arizona
*Non-conference game. ^{#}Rankings from AP poll. (#) Tournament seedings in parentheses. All times are in Pacific time.
