= 1989–90 Arizona Wildcats men's basketball team =

American college basketball season

1989–90 Arizona Wildcats men's basketball

Pacific-10 regular season co-champions Pacific-10 tournament champions

NCAA tournament, second round
- Conference: Pacific-10 Conference

Ranking
- Coaches: No. 12
- AP: No. 14
- Record: 25–7 (15–3 Pac-10)
- Head coach: Lute Olson (7th season)
- Assistant coaches: Jim Rosborough (1st season); Jessie Evans (2nd season)
- Home arena: McKale Center (Capacity: 14,545)

1989–90 Pacific-10 Conference men's basketball standings
	Conf.				Overall
Team	W		L	PCT	W		L	PCT
No. 22 Oregon State	15	–	3	.833	22	–	7	.759
No. 14 Arizona †	15	–	3	.833	25	–	7	.781
California	12	–	6	.667	22	–	10	.688
UCLA	11	–	7	.611	22	–	11	.667
Oregon	10	–	8	.556	15	–	14	.517
Stanford	9	–	9	.500	18	–	12	.600
USC	6	–	12	.333	12	–	16	.429
Arizona State	6	–	12	.333	15	–	16	.484
Washington	5	–	13	.278	11	–	17	.393
Washington State	1	–	17	.056	7	–	22	.241
† Conference tournament winner As of April 15, 1990; Rankings from AP Poll

The 1989–90 Arizona Wildcats men's basketball team represented the University of Arizona. The head coach was Lute Olson. The team played its home games in the McKale Center in Tucson, Arizona, and was a member of the Pacific-10 Conference. In the Pac-10 Basketball Tournament, Arizona beat UCLA by a score of 94–78 to claim its third consecutive Pac-10 title.

== Roster ==
1989–90 Arizona Wildcats men's basketball team
Players
Coaches

Pos.	#	Name	Height	Weight	Year	Previous school	Hometown
G	11	Casey Schmidt	6 ft 5 in (1.96 m)	—	Fr	Valparaiso HS	Valparaiso, IN
PG	12	Matt Othick	6 ft 2 in (1.88 m)	165 lb (75 kg)	So	Bishop Gorman HS	Clovis, NM
C	21	Brian Williams	6 ft 9 in (2.06 m)	235 lb (107 kg)	So	Saint Monica Catholic HS	Fresno, CA
G/F	23	Deron Johnson	6 ft 5 in (1.96 m)	—	Fr	Sunnyside HS	Tucson, AZ
G	24	Matt Muehlebach	—	—	Jr	Stillwell HS	Rockhurst, KS
F	30	Wayne Womack	6 ft 8 in (2.03 m)	—	So	John Muir HS	Pasadena, CA
C	34	Brian David	6 ft 9 in (2.06 m)	—	Sr	Kuemper HS	Templeton, IA
SF	35	Jud Buechler	6 ft 6 in (1.98 m)	210 lb (95 kg)	Sr	Poway HS	Poway, CA
C	41	Ed Stokes	7 ft 0 in (2.13 m)	210 lb (95 kg)	Sr	St. Bernard HS	Los Angeles, CA
F	42	Chris Mills	6 ft 6 in (1.98 m)	—	So	Fairfax HS	Los Angeles, CA
G	44	Harvey Mason	6 ft 3 in (1.91 m)	—	RS Sr	Crescenta HS	La Crescenta, CA
C	45	Sean Rooks	6 ft 10 in (2.08 m)	250 lb (113 kg)	So	Fontana HS	New York, NY
F	51	Kevin Flanagan	6 ft 9 in (2.06 m)	—	Fr	Torrey Pines HS	Del Mar, CA

Head coach

- Lute Olson (Augsburg)

Assistant coach(es)

Legend

- (C) Team captain
- (S) Suspended
- (I) Ineligible
- (W) Walk-on
- Injured
- Current redshirt

== Schedule and results ==
Date time, TV	Rank^{#}	Opponent^{#}	Result	Record	Site city, state
Regular season
Nov 25, 1989*	No. 6	vs. No. 4 Michigan; Hall of Fame Tip-Off Classic	W 82-75	1–0	Springfield Civic Arena; Springfield, Massachusetts
Nov 30, 1989	No. 2	at Oregon	L 63-68	1–1 (0-1)	McArthur Court; Eugene, Oregon
Dec 2, 1989	No. 2	at Oregon State	L 61-84	1-2 (0-2)	Gill Coliseum; Corvallis, Oregon
Dec 6, 1989*	No. 20	Northern Arizona	W 84-37	2-2	McKale Center; Tucson, Arizona
Dec 19, 1989	No. 22	Miami (FL)	W 83-53	3-2	McKale Center; Tucson, Arizona
Dec 28, 1989	No. 21	Penn State	W 74-55	4-2	McKale Center; Tucson, Arizona
Dec 29, 1989*	No. 21	Purdue	W 85-66	5-2	McKale Center; Tucson, Arizona
Jan 2, 1990	No. 19	California	W 71-70	6-2 (1-2)	McKale Center; Tucson, Arizona
Jan 4, 1990	No. 19	Washington	W 65-51	7-2 (2-2)	McKale Center; Tucson, Arizona
Jan 6, 1990	No. 19	Washington State	W 81-61	8–2 (3–2)	McKale Center; Tucson, Arizona
Jan 11, 1990	No. 18	at Southern California	W 90-75	9–2 (4–2)	L.A. Sports Arena; Los Angeles, California
Jan 13, 1990	No. 18	at No. 19 UCLA; Rivalry	L 67-73	9-3 (4-3)	Pauley Pavilion; Los Angeles, California
Jan 17, 1990	No. 23	at Arizona State; Rivalry	W 70-61	10-3 (5-3)	ASU Activity Center; Tempe, Arizona
Jan 20, 1990*	No. 23	No. 3 Oklahoma	W 78-74	11-3	McKale Center; Tucson, Arizona
Jan 25, 1990*	No. 19	Stanford	W 68-61	12-3 (6-3)	McKale Center; Tucson, Arizona
Jan 27, 1990*	No. 19	at Pittsburgh	L 92-100	12-4	Fitzgerald Field House; Pittsburgh, Pennsylvania
Feb 1, 1990	No. 24	at No. 19 Washington State	W 86-62	13-4 (7-3)	Friel Court; Pullman, Washington
Feb 3, 1990	No. 24	at Washington	W 75-60	14-4 (8-3)	Hec Edmundson Pavilion; Seattle, Washington
Feb 8, 1990	No. 22	Southern California	W 95-70	15-4 (9-3)	McKale Center; Tucson, Arizona
Feb 10, 1990	No. 22	No. 19 UCLA; Rivalry	W 83-74	16-4 (10-3)	McKale Center; Tucson, Arizona
Feb 15, 1990	No. 20	Arizona State; Rivalry	W 71-50	17-4 (11-3)	McKale Center; Tucson, Arizona
Feb 18, 1990*	No. 20	at No. 7 UNLV	L 87-95	17-5	Thomas & Mack Center; Paradise, Nevada
Feb 21, 1990	No. 21	at California	W 93-68	18-5 (12-3)	Harmon Gym; Berkeley, California
Feb 23, 1990	No. 21	at Stanford	W 80-61	19-5 (13-3)	Maples Pavilion; Stanford, California
Feb 25, 1990*	No. 21	at No. 3 Duke	L 76-78	19-6	Cameron Indoor Stadium; Durham, North Carolina
Mar 1, 1990	No. 23	Oregon	W 84-58	20-6 (14-3)	McKale Center; Tucson, Arizona
Mar 3, 1990	No. 23	No. 16 Oregon State	W 87-60	21-6 (15-3)	McKale Center; Tucson, Arizona
Pac-10 Tournament
Mar 9, 1990*	(2) No. 15	vs. (7) Southern California; Pac-10 Tournament Quarterfinal	W 80-57	22-6	ASU Activity Center; Tempe, Arizona
Mar 10, 1990*	(2) No. 15	vs. (6) Stanford; Pac-10 Tournament Semifinal	W 85-61	23-6	ASU Activity Center; Tempe, Arizona
Mar 11, 1990*	(2) No. 15	vs. (4) UCLA; Pac-10 tournament championship	W 94-78	24-6	ASU Activity Center; Tempe, Arizona
NCAA Tournament
Mar 16, 1990*	(2 W) No. 14	vs. (15 W) South Florida; First Round	W 79-66	25-6	Long Beach Arena; Long Beach, California
Mar 18, 1990*	(2 W) No. 14	vs. (7 W) No. 23 Alabama; Second Round	L 55-77	25-7	Long Beach Arena; Long Beach, California

== Awards and honors ==
- Jud Buechler, Pacific-10 Conference men's basketball tournament Most Valuable Player

== Team players drafted into the NBA ==
Round	Pick	Player	NBA club
2	38	Jud Buechler	Seattle SuperSonics
