= Jimmy Anderson (basketball) =

American college basketball coach (1937–2024)

Biographical details
- Born: April 20, 1937; Britton, South Dakota, U.S.
- Died: March 4, 2024 (aged 86); Corvallis, Oregon, U.S.

Playing career
- 1957–1959: Oregon State

Coaching career (HC unless noted)
- 1965–1989: Oregon State (assistant)
- 1989–1995: Oregon State

Head coaching record
- Overall: 79–90
- Tournaments: 0–1 (NCAA Division I)

Accomplishments and honors

Championships
- Pac-10 regular season (1990)

Awards
- Pac-10 Coach of the Year (1990)

James Edward Anderson (April 20, 1937 – March 4, 2024) was an American college basketball player and coach. He was a longtime assistant at Oregon State University (OSU) to head coaches Paul Valenti and Ralph Miller, given credit for recruiting a series of top-level players to the school during the 1970s and 1980s. Anderson assumed the role as head coach of men's basketball at OSU from 1989 to 1995, compiling a record of 79–90.

Anderson was inducted as a member of the Oregon State Hall of Fame and the Pac-12 Hall of Honor.

== Biography ==
=== Early years ===
Jimmy Anderson was born April 20, 1937, in Britton, South Dakota, to Harry and Mary Anderson. He was the third-born of a family of five children.

Before he was old enough to enter school, the Anderson family moved to the town of Hoquiam, Washington. It was there that Anderson was raised, attending a Catholic grade school before eventually enrolling in Hoquiam High School. Anderson was a three-sport athlete at Hoquiam High, playing basketball, football, and baseball at the varsity level.

=== College playing career ===
Oregon State guard Jimmy Anderson drives to the rack over UCLA's Walter Torrence, 1959.

Anderson did not initially draw offers for a collegiate athletic scholarship, so he enrolled at Grays Harbor Junior College where he walked on to the basket ball team. It was playing for Grays Harbor that he first gained the notice of Oregon State College (today's Oregon State University), when he was viewed in a game by assistant football coach Jerry Long. Long passed on information about the "feisty little guard" that he had seen to OSC head coach Amory "Slats" Gill, who investigated further. Anderson was subsequently offered a "full-ride" basketball scholarship to OSC for the 1957–58 season.

Anderson played on OSC teams that won three Far West Classic titles and a Pacific Coast Conference championship in 1958. In his 1959 senior season he was named to the Classic's all-tournament team.

While at OSU he was a member of Phi Sigma Kappa fraternity. He graduated in 1959.

After graduation, Anderson pursued a Master's degree, which he followed up with a two-year stint as a teacher and coach at Newberg High School in Newberg, Oregon.

=== Coaching career ===
Anderson's coaching debut as coach came in 1960, when he was named head coach of the freshman team. During this era of collegiate athletics, freshmen were not permitted to play on varsity squads, but instead played for one year on parallel units against their peers at other schools. During Anderson's three-year tenure as head coach of Oregon State's rooks, the Beavers compiled a record of 45–7.

Anderson began his stint as assistant varsity coach under head coach Paul Valenti in 1964, continuing in that role when the position was assumed by future Hall of Fame coach Ralph Miller. Of critical importance among his duties for both of these coaches was West coast scouting and recruiting, the bulk of which was under his control.

Anderson gained a reputation as an outstanding recruiter for OSU and is regarded as instrumental in the success of the men's basketball program during the 1970s and 1980s. Career NBA player and coach Lester Conner recalled how Anderson spent almost an entire year recruiting him to Oregon State when he was a sophomore playing in California in junior college. "He followed me everywhere," Conner recalled. "Street kid from the rough streets of Oakland, a Caucasian man — that's hard for us to do. You know, the trust factor and everything else.... If it wasn't for Jimmy, I wouldn't have gone to Oregon State. I owe all the credit in the world to Jimmy Anderson."

NBA All-Star and 11-year player Steve Johnson similarly gave Anderson great credit for the success of the OSU team in the 1970s and 1980s. "It was a combination of Ralph's record and his street cred," Johnson said. "Ralph was gruff, Jimmy was the personable one — the one you could go to."

Other future NBA players recruited by Anderson to Oregon State included Freddie Boyd, Lonnie Shelton, Ray Blume, Mark Radford, Charlie Sitton, A.C. Green, Brent Barry, and Gary Payton.

In his first season at Oregon State, he was named the Pac-10 Coach of the Year and led the Beavers to the 1990 NCAA Division I men's basketball tournament, the school's last NCAA Tournament appearance until 2016.

A smooth transition from the legendary Miller to his vaunted assistant proved impossible, however, and the OSU program faltered over the next five years, leading to Anderson's dismissal following the disappointing 1994–95 season.

=== Personal life ===
Anderson married the former Fifi Quisenberry, a woman he met while working as a teacher's assistant in a health class. The couple remained together for 63 years, raising a family of four children.

Anderson was a lifelong partisan of Oregon State athletics, holding season tickets to the school's men's and women's basketball, football, and baseball programs throughout his life.

=== Death and legacy ===
Anderson died on March 4, 2024, at the age of 86.

At the time of his death, Anderson was honored with a statement from US Senator Ron Wyden, who declared, "The history of it cannot be written without a huge chapter on Jimmy Anderson, a class act who played a big role over the years in OSU basketball."

Anderson was inducted as a member of the Oregon State Hall of Fame and the Pac-12 Hall of Honor.

== Head coaching record ==
Record table
Season	Team	Overall	Conference	Standing	Postseason
Oregon State Beavers (Pacific-10 Conference) (1970–1989)
1989–90	Oregon State	22–7	15–3	T–1st	NCAA Division I First Round
1990–91	Oregon State	14–14	8–10	T–5th	
1991–92	Oregon State	15–16	7–11	7th	
1992–93	Oregon State	13–14	9–9	T–5th	
1993–94	Oregon State	6–21	2–16	10th	
1994–95	Oregon State	9–18	6–12	T–7th	
Oregon State:		79–90	47–61		
Total:		79–90			
National champion Postseason invitational champion Conference regular season champion Conference regular season and conference tournament champion Division regular season champion Division regular season and conference tournament champion Conference tournament champion
