= 1989–90 UCLA Bruins men's basketball team =

American college basketball season

1989–90 UCLA Bruins men's basketball

NCAA tournament, Sweet Sixteen
- Conference: Pacific-10
- Record: 22–11 (11–7, 4th Pac-10)
- Head coach: Jim Harrick (2nd season)
- Assistant coaches: Brad Holland; Mark Gottfried
- Home arena: Pauley Pavilion

1989–90 Pacific-10 Conference men's basketball standings
	Conf.				Overall
Team	W		L	PCT	W		L	PCT
No. 22 Oregon State	15	–	3	.833	22	–	7	.759
No. 14 Arizona †	15	–	3	.833	25	–	7	.781
California	12	–	6	.667	22	–	10	.688
UCLA	11	–	7	.611	22	–	11	.667
Oregon	10	–	8	.556	15	–	14	.517
Stanford	9	–	9	.500	18	–	12	.600
USC	6	–	12	.333	12	–	16	.429
Arizona State	6	–	12	.333	15	–	16	.484
Washington	5	–	13	.278	11	–	17	.393
Washington State	1	–	17	.056	7	–	22	.241
† Conference tournament winner As of April 15, 1990; Rankings from AP Poll

The 1989–90 UCLA Bruins men's basketball team represented the University of California, Los Angeles in the 1989–90 NCAA Division I men's basketball season. The Bruins started the season ranked 13th in the AP Poll. Jim Harrick in his second year as head coach for the Bruins, led them to a 4th place in the Pac-10. UCLA went on to the NCAA tournament where they advanced to the Sweet Sixteen, before losing to Duke 90–81.

== Starting lineup ==
Position	Player	Class
F	Trevor Wilson	Sr.
F	Don MacLean	So.
F	Tracy Murray	Fr.
G	Darrick Martin	So.
G	Gerald Madkins	So.

== Roster ==
1989–90 UCLA Bruins men's basketball team
Players
Coaches

Pos.	#	Name	Height	Weight	Year	Hometown
G	23	Mitchell Butler	6 ft 5 in (1.96 m)	—	Fr	Los Angeles, California
G	21	Darrin Dafney	6 ft 4 in (1.93 m)	—	So
F	42	Don MacLean	6 ft 10 in (2.08 m)	—	So	Palo Alto, California
G	12	Gerald Madkins	6 ft 3 in (1.91 m)	—	So	Merced, California
G	15	Darrick Martin	5 ft 11 in (1.8 m)	—	So	Denver, Colorado
F	44	Zan Mason	6 ft 7 in (2.01 m)	—	Fr
F	30	Tracy Murray	6 ft 8 in (2.03 m)	—	Fr	Los Angeles, California
C	25	Keith Owens	6 ft 8 in (2.03 m)	—	Jr	San Francisco, California
C	50	Kevin Walker	6 ft 10 in (2.08 m)	—	Sr
G	11	Kevin Williams	6 ft 2 in (1.88 m)	—	Jr
F	4	Trevor Wilson (C)	6 ft 8 in (2.03 m)	—	Sr	Los Angeles, California

Head coach

Jim Harrick (Morris Harvey College)

Assistant coach(es)

- Brad Holland (UCLA)
- Mark Gottfried (Alabama)
- Tony Fuller (Pepperdine)

Legend

- (C) Team captain
- (S) Suspended
- (I) Ineligible
- (W) Walk-on
- Injured
- Current redshirt

Roster

== Schedule ==
Date time, TV	Rank^{#}	Opponent^{#}	Result	Record	Site city, state
Regular Season
November 25, 1989	No. 13	Santa Clara	W 66–62	1–0	Pauley Pavilion (8,761); Los Angeles, CA
November 30, 1989	No. 15	at Washington	W 58–56	2–0 (1–0)	Hec Edmundson Pavilion (5,230); Seattle, WA
December 2, 1989	No. 15	at Washington State	W 68–64	3–0 (2–0)	Beasley Coliseum (4,360); Pullman, WA
December 9, 1989	No. 13	San Diego	W 83–74	4–0	Pauley Pavilion (5,714); Los Angeles, CA
December 17, 1989	No. 13	at Notre Dame	L 84–86	4–1	Edmund P. Joyce Center (10,717); Notre Dame, IN
December 19, 1989	No. 18	American	W 89–74	5–1	Pauley Pavilion (5,468); Los Angeles, CA
December 23, 1989	No. 18	Cal State Fullerton	W 87–75	6–1	Pauley Pavilion (10,217); Los Angeles, CA
December 27, 1989	No. 16	at Fresno State	W 74–65	7–1	Selland Arena (10,159); Fresno, CA
December 29, 1989	No. 16	East Tennessee State	W 115–66	8–1	Pauley Pavilion (7,466); Los Angeles, CA
January 3, 1990	No. 15	USC	W 89–72	9–1 (3–0)	Pauley Pavilion (12,583); Los Angeles, CA
January 7, 1990	No. 15	at No. 8 Louisville	L 80–97	9–2	Freedom Hall (19,455); Louisville, KY
January 11, 1990	No. 19	Arizona State	W 62–53	10–2 (4–0)	Pauley Pavilion (8,681); Los Angeles, CA
January 13, 1990	No. 19	No. 18 Arizona	W 73–67	11–2 (5–0)	Pauley Pavilion (12,312); Los Angeles, CA
January 18, 1990	No. 16	at Stanford	L 79–87	11–3 (5–1)	Maples Pavilion (7,500); Stanford, CA
January 21, 1990	No. 16	at California	W 106–97	12–3 (6–1)	Harmon Gym (6,578); Berkeley, CA
January 25, 1990	No. 23	Oregon	W 79–62	13–3 (7–1)	Pauley Pavilion (9,458); Los Angeles, CA
January 27, 1990	No. 23	Oregon State	W 94–80	14–3 (8–1)	Pauley Pavilion (12,525); Los Angeles, CA
February 1, 1990	No. 16	at USC	L 75–76	14–4 (8–2)	Los Angeles Memorial Sports Arena (6,455); Los Angeles, CA
February 3, 1990	No. 16	DePaul	W 87–77	15–4	Pauley Pavilion (12,668); Los Angeles, CA
February 8, 1990	No. 19	at Arizona State	W 80–72	16–4 (9–2)	ASU Activity Center (10,994); Tempe, AZ
February 10, 1990	No. 19	at Arizona	L 74–83	16–5 (9–3)	McKale Center (13,627); Tucson, AZ
February 15, 1990	No. 23	California	L 71–79	16–6 (9–4)	Pauley Pavilion (10,788); Los Angeles, CA
February 18, 1990	No. 23	Stanford	L 69–70	16–7 (9–5)	Pauley Pavilion (10,936); Los Angeles, CA
February 22, 1990		at Oregon	L 99–105	16–8 (9–6)	McArthur Court (9,134); Eugene, OR
February 24, 1990		at No. 17 Oregon State	L 74–83	16–9 (9–7)	Gill Coliseum (10,400); Corvallis, OR
March 1, 1990		Washington State	W 96–89	17–9 (10–7)	Pauley Pavilion (7,267); Los Angeles, CA
March 4, 1990		Washington	W 74–61	18–9 (11–7)	Pauley Pavilion (8,166); Los Angeles, CA
Pac-10 Tournament
March 9, 1990	(4)	vs. (5) Oregon; Quarterfinals	W 94–76	19–9	McKale Center (4,380); Tucson, AZ
March 10, 1990	(4)	vs. (8) Arizona State; Semifinals	W 79–78	20–9	McKale Center (10,989); Tucson, AZ
March 11, 1990	(4)	vs. (2) No. 15 Arizona; Finals	L 78–94	20–10	McKale Center (8,087); Tucson, AZ
NCAA tournament
March 16, 1990	(7 E)	vs. (10 E) UAB; First round	W 68–56	21–10	Omni Coliseum (10,742); Atlanta, GA
March 18, 1990	(7 E)	vs. (2 E) No. 5 Kansas; Second Round	W 71–70	22–10	Omni Coliseum (11,630); Atlanta, GA
March 22, 1990	(7 E)	vs. (3 E) No. 15 Duke; Regional semifinals	L 81–90	22–11	Brendan Byrne Arena (19,502); East Rutherford, NJ
*Non-conference game. ^{#}Rankings from AP Poll. (#) Tournament seedings in parentheses. All times are in Pacific Time.
