= 1989–90 Colorado State Rams men's basketball team =

American college basketball season

1989–90 Colorado State Rams men's basketball
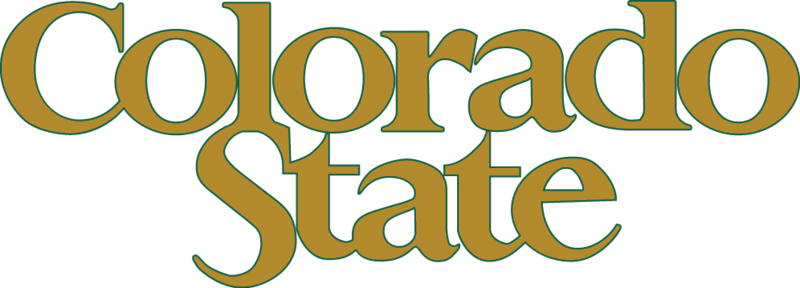

WAC Regular season co-champions Mile High Classic champions

NCAA tournament
- Conference: Western Athletic Conference
- Record: 21–9 (11–5 WAC)
- Head coach: Boyd Grant (3rd season)
- Assistant coach: Jeff Jackson
- Home arena: Moby Arena

1989–90 WAC men's basketball standings
| | Conf. | | | | Overall |
| Team | W | | L | PCT | W | | L | PCT |
|---|---|---|---|---|---|---|---|---|
| Colorado State | 11 | – | 5 | .688 | 21 | – | 9 | .700 |
| BYU | 11 | – | 5 | .688 | 21 | – | 9 | .700 |
| Hawaii | 10 | – | 6 | .625 | 25 | – | 10 | .714 |
| UTEP † | 10 | – | 6 | .625 | 21 | – | 11 | .656 |
| New Mexico | 9 | – | 7 | .563 | 20 | – | 14 | .588 |
| Wyoming | 7 | – | 9 | .438 | 15 | – | 14 | .517 |
| Utah | 7 | – | 9 | .438 | 16 | – | 14 | .533 |
| San Diego State | 4 | – | 12 | .250 | 13 | – | 18 | .419 |
| Air Force | 3 | – | 13 | .188 | 12 | – | 20 | .375 |
† 1990 WAC tournament winner Rankings from AP Poll

The 1989–90 Colorado State Rams men's basketball team represented Colorado State University as a member of the Western Athletic Conference during the 1989–90 college basketball season. The team was led by head coach Boyd Grant. The Rams finished 21–9 and won the WAC regular season title with a 11–5 conference record. The team received an at-large bid to the NCAA tournament as the No. 10 seed in the West region. The Rams were beaten by No. 7 seed Alabama in the first round.

== Roster ==
1989–90 Colorado State Rams men's basketball team
| Players | Coaches |
|---|---|
| Pos. / # / Name / Height / Weight / Year / Hometown; F/C / 32 / Mike Mitchell / 6 ft 8 in (2.03 m) / 225 lb (102 kg) / RS Sr / Los Angeles, California | Head coach: Boyd Grant (Colorado State); Assistant coach(es): Jeff Jackson (Cornell); Legend: (C) Team captain; (S) Suspended; (I) Ineligible; (W) Walk-on; Injured; Current redshirt |

== Schedule and results ==
| Date time, TV | Rank^{#} | Opponent^{#} | Result | Record | Site city, state |
Regular season
| Nov 25, 1989* | | Texas-Pan American | W 77–53 | 1–0 | Moby Arena; Fort Collins, Colorado |
| Dec 1, 1989* | | vs. Eastern Kentucky | W 75–66 | 2–0 | |
| Dec 2, 1989* | | at Marshall | L 58–65 | 2–1 | Cam Henderson Center; Huntington, West Virginia |
| Dec 7, 1989* | | Northwestern State | W 94–61 | 3–1 | Moby Arena; Fort Collins, Colorado |
| Dec 9, 1989* | | at Idaho State | W 62–47 | 4–1 | Holt Arena; Pocatello, Idaho |
| Dec 16, 1989* | | at Montana | L 47–50 | 4–2 | Dahlberg Arena; Missoula, Montana |
| Dec 18, 1989* | | Cal State Fullerton | W 84–55 | 5–2 | Moby Arena; Fort Collins, Colorado |
| Dec 20, 1989* | | Baylor | W 74–55 | 6–2 | Moby Arena; Fort Collins, Colorado |
| Dec 23, 1989* | | North Texas | W 93–70 | 7–2 | Moby Arena; Fort Collins, Colorado |
| Dec 29, 1989* | | vs. No. 24 North Carolina; Mile High Classic | W 78–67 | 8–2 | McNichols Sports Arena; Denver, Colorado |
| Dec 30, 1989* | | vs. UMass; Mile High Classic | W 77–51 | 9–2 | McNichols Sports Arena; Denver, Colorado |
| Mar 3, 1990 | | San Diego State | W 62–45 | 20–7 (11–5) | Moby Arena; Fort Collins, Colorado |
WAC tournament
| Mar 8, 1990* | (1) | vs. (9) Air Force; Quarterfinals | L 51–58 | 21–8 | Special Events Center; El Paso, Texas |
NCAA tournament
| Mar 16, 1990* | (10 W) | vs. (7 W) No. 23 Alabama; First Round | L 54–71 | 21–9 | Long Beach Arena; Long Beach, California |
*Non-conference game. ^{#}Rankings from AP Poll. (#) Tournament seedings in parentheses. W=West.
