= Gary Payton =

American basketball player (born 1968)

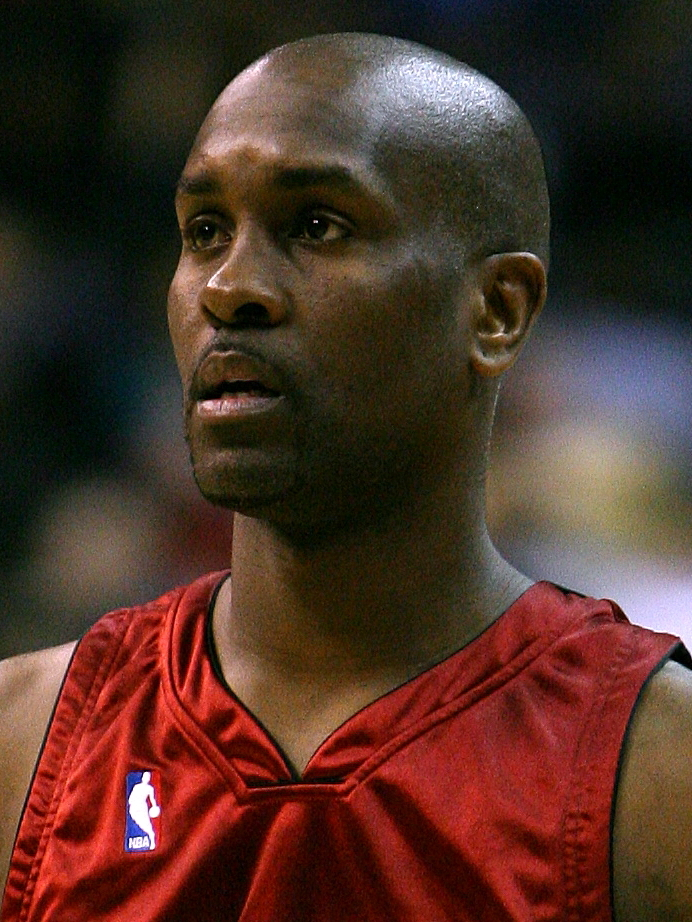
- Payton with the Miami Heat in 2007

Alameda Cougars
- Title: Head coach
- League: Bay Valley Conference

Personal information
- Born: July 23, 1968 (age 58) Oakland, California, U.S.
- Listed height: 6 ft 4 in (1.93 m)
- Listed weight: 190 lb (86 kg)

Career information
- High school: Skyline (Oakland, California)
- College: Oregon State (1986–1990)
- NBA draft: 1990: 1st round, 2nd overall pick
- Drafted by: Seattle SuperSonics
- Playing career: 1990–2007
- Position: Point guard
- Number: 2, 20
- Coaching career: 2021–present

Career history

Playing
- 1990–2003: Seattle SuperSonics
- 2003: Milwaukee Bucks
- 2003–2004: Los Angeles Lakers
- 2004–2005: Boston Celtics
- 2005–2007: Miami Heat

Coaching
- 2021–2024: Lincoln (California)
- 2024–present: Alameda

Career highlights
- As player: NBA champion (2006); 9× NBA All-Star (1994–1998, 2000–2003); 2× All-NBA First Team (1998, 2000); 5× All-NBA Second Team (1995–1997, 1999, 2002); 2× All-NBA Third Team (1994, 2001); NBA Defensive Player of the Year (1996); 9× NBA All-Defensive First Team (1994–2002); NBA steals leader (1996); NBA All-Rookie Second Team (1991); NBA 75th Anniversary Team; Consensus first-team All-American (1990); Pac-10 Player of the Year (1990); 3× All-Pac-10 (1988–1990); Pac-10 Defensive Player of the Year (1987); Pac-10 All Defensive Team (1987); Pac-10 Rookie of the Year (1987); No. 20 retired by Oregon State Beavers; USA Basketball Male Athlete of the Year (1999)

Career NBA statistics
- Points: 21,813 (16.3 ppg)
- Rebounds: 5,269 (3.9 rpg)
- Assists: 8,966 (6.7 apg)
- Stats at NBA.com
- Stats at Basketball Reference
- Basketball Hall of Fame
Medals
Men's basketball
Representing the United States
Olympic Games
Gold medal – first place	1996 Atlanta	Team competition
Gold medal – first place	2000 Sydney	Team competition
FIBA Americas Championship
Gold medal – first place	1999 San Juan	Team competition
Silver medal – second place	1989 Mexico City	Team competition
FIBA U19 World Championship
Silver medal – second place	1987 Bormio	Team competition

Gary Dwayne Payton Sr. (born July 23, 1968) is an American former professional basketball player who played in the National Basketball Association (NBA) for 17 seasons. Nicknamed "the Glove", he is widely regarded as one of the greatest defenders of all time. He spent the majority of his career with the Seattle SuperSonics, where he holds franchise records in assists and steals, and later played short stints for the Milwaukee Bucks, Los Angeles Lakers, Boston Celtics, and Miami Heat. He made three NBA Finals appearances: with the Sonics in 1996, the Lakers in 2004, and the Heat in 2006, winning in the last.

Payton was the first (and, until Marcus Smart was selected in 2022, only) point guard to win the NBA Defensive Player of the Year award. He was selected for nine All-NBA Teams, All-Defensive First Teams (tying the record), and All-Star Games each. He was inducted into the Naismith Basketball Hall of Fame in 2013 and named to the NBA 75th Anniversary Team in 2021.

== Early life ==
Gary Dwayne Payton was born on July 23, 1968, in Oakland, California. He attended Skyline High School, where he excelled in basketball along with former NBA player Greg Foster.

== College career ==
Payton played college basketball at Oregon State University in Corvallis, then led by hall of fame head coach Ralph Miller. At one point, he wanted to attend the University of Texas at El Paso (UTEP), but hall of fame head coach Don Haskins later rescinded his offer after Payton was deciding between UTEP and St. John's. In his sophomore year of high school, his grades plummeted and he was declared academically ineligible. His father encouraged him to focus on school, and he was allowed to play again. Throughout his four-year career at Oregon State, he became one of the most decorated basketball players in school history. Miller retired at age seventy in 1989, after Payton's junior season, and was succeeded by Jim Anderson.

During his senior season in 1989–90, Payton was featured in the cover story of Sports Illustrated on March 5 as the nation's best college basketball player. He was a consensus All-American, a three-time All-Pac-10 selection, and both the Pac-10 Defensive Player of the Year and conference Freshman of the Year in 1987. He was the MVP of the Far West Classic tournament three times, the Pac-10 Player of the Week nine times, and named to the Pac-10's All-Decade Team. At the time of his graduation, Payton held the school record for points, field goals, three-point field goals, assists, and steals – all of which he still holds today except for career points and three-point field goals. During his career at OSU, the Beavers made three NCAA tournament appearances and one NIT appearance. He was elected into OSU's Sports Hall of Fame in 1996.

== Professional career ==
=== Seattle SuperSonics (1990–2003) ===
Payton was the second overall pick in the 1990 NBA draft by the Seattle SuperSonics, and wound up spending his first 12½ seasons with the Sonics. Payton wore the #20 jersey for the majority of his NBA career, except for his rookie season when he wore #2 due to Quintin Dailey wearing his preferred #20.

In his third career game, Payton recorded his first double-double after recording 13 points and 10 assists in a road win over the Nuggets. On February 23, 1991, Payton recorded his first career triple-double after recording 18 points, 10 rebounds, and 11 assists in a losing effort to the Suns. The following game, Payton scored only 2 points but dished out 16 assists, a then career-high for him. He joined Slick Watts and Nate McMillan as the only SuperSonics' players to have dished out 16 or more assists in his rookie season. Throughout his rookie campaign, Payton recorded 8 point-assist double-doubles, the most by any SuperSonics' player in history. His average for his rookie season is 7.2 points per game, 3.0 rebounds per game, 6.4 assists per game, and 2.0 steals per game.

Entering the league to star-studded expectations, Payton struggled during his first two seasons in the league, averaging 8.2 points per game during that span. In his second season, Payton recorded 2 triple-doubles on the whole season joining Slick Watts and Nate McMillan at that time to have recorded 2 triple-doubles in a season in Supersonics franchise history. He scored a season-high 22 points to go along with 7 assists in a road win over the Bullets on November 19, 1991. His season average is 9.4 points per game, 3.6 rebounds per game, 6.2 assists per game, 1.8 steals per game, and 0.3 blocks per game.

Payton soon proved himself to be one of the league's top point guards during the 1990s. Payton, alongside Shawn Kemp formed the "Sonic Boom", under head coach George Karl. In 1996, the SuperSonics won a franchise record 64 games, then reached the NBA Finals where they lost in six games to Michael Jordan's Chicago Bulls. The SuperSonics trailed in the series 0-3, but with Payton assigned to guard Jordan the SuperSonics staved off elimination by winning Games Four and Five.

In 2001, the SuperSonics were bought by Howard Schultz, with whom Payton had a sour relationship. When Payton did not attend the first day of training camp in 2002, Schultz insisted that Payton be traded.

=== Milwaukee Bucks (2003) ===
In the middle of the 2002–03 season at the trade deadline, Payton was traded to the Milwaukee Bucks along with Desmond Mason in exchange for Ray Allen, Kevin Ollie, Ronald Murray and 2003 first-round draft pick. Payton was reunited with George Karl, who had been his head coach with the Sonics and was now in the same capacity with the Bucks. Payton played the remaining 28 games with the Bucks, averaging 19.6 points and 7.4 assists per game. The Bucks faced the defending Eastern Conference champion New Jersey Nets in the first round of the playoffs, pushing the Nets to six games before losing to the more experienced and well rounded Nets. Payton led the Bucks in scoring (18.5) and assists (8.7) during the series, which included a 20-point, 14-assist performance in a Game 4 Milwaukee win.

=== Los Angeles Lakers (2003–2004) ===
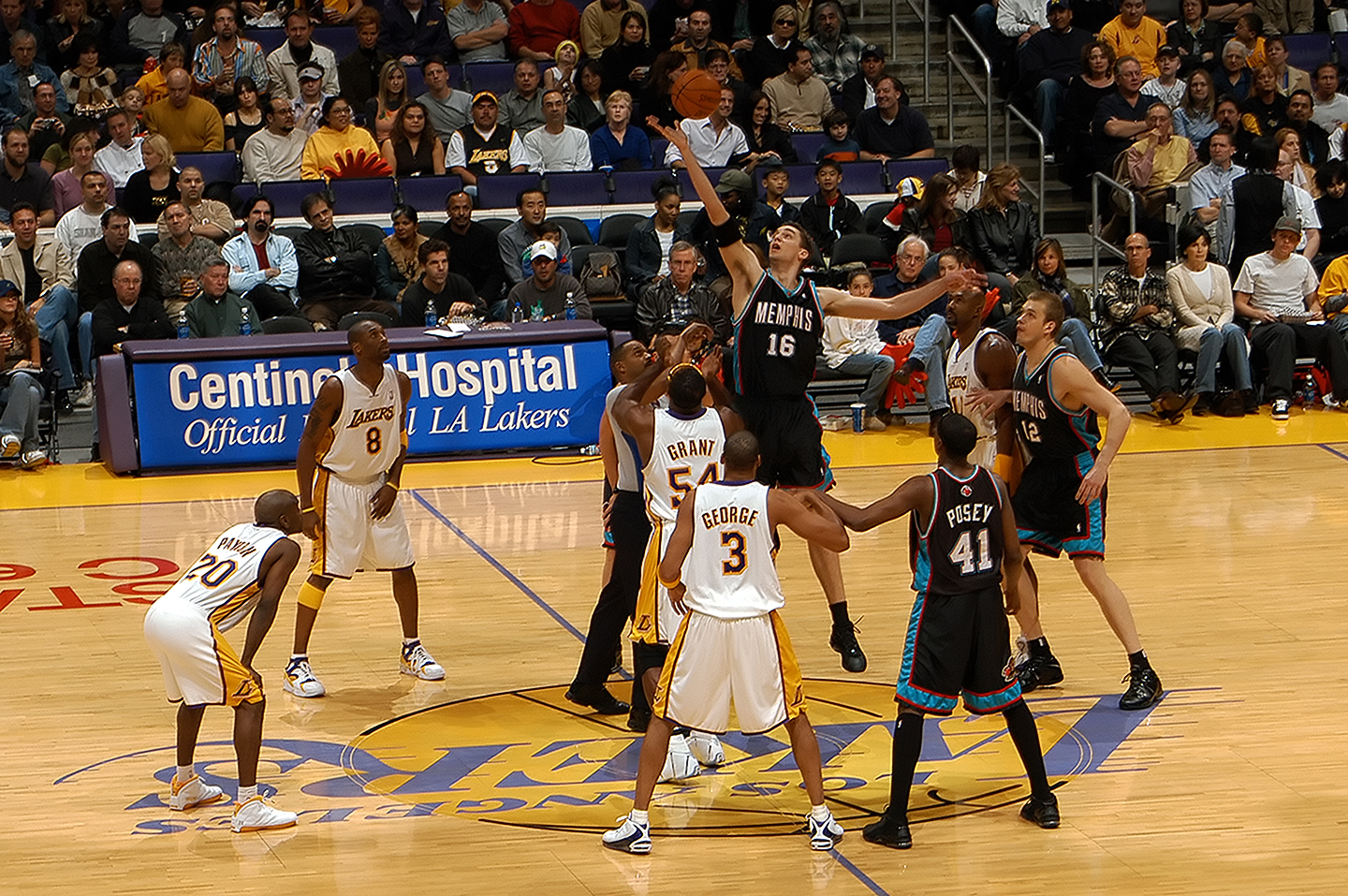
Payton (left) during his stint with the Lakers

As an unrestricted free agent prior to the 2003–04 season, Payton, along with Karl Malone, signed with the Los Angeles Lakers to make a run at their first NBA Championship. Payton started in all 82 games and averaged 14.6 points with 5.5 assists and 1.2 steals, but struggled with Lakers coach Phil Jackson's triangle offense, which limited his ball-handling and post-up opportunities. Payton provided offense in games where superstar teammates Shaquille O'Neal or Kobe Bryant could not play due to injury, including a 30-point outburst in an overtime win against the Cleveland Cavaliers on February 4.

Despite injuries to Malone, O'Neal and Bryant throughout the season, the Lakers won 56 games and the Pacific Division. In the playoffs, Payton averaged just 7.8 points per game, but scored 15 points in Games 3 and 6 of the Lakers' semifinals series against the San Antonio Spurs, and scored 18 points to go with nine assists in Game 3 of the Western Conference Finals against the Minnesota Timberwolves. The Lakers would reach the NBA Finals before falling to the Detroit Pistons in five games.

=== Boston Celtics (2004–2005) ===
Prior to the 2004–05 season, the Lakers traded Payton and Rick Fox to the Boston Celtics for center Chris Mihm, small forward Jumaine Jones and point guard Chucky Atkins. While Payton expressed displeasure with the trade, he ultimately did report to Boston and began the 2004–05 season as the Celtics' starting point guard. On February 24, 2005, Payton was traded to the Atlanta Hawks in a deal that brought former Celtic Antoine Walker back to Boston. The Hawks then waived Payton immediately following the trade, and he returned a week later to Boston as a free agent. Payton started all 77 games he played for Boston and averaged 11.3 points per game and 6.1 assists as the Celtics won the Atlantic Division before losing in the first round to the Indiana Pacers.

=== Miami Heat (2005–2007) ===
On September 22, 2005, he signed a one-year $1.1 million contract with Miami, reuniting with Walker (who was acquired seven weeks earlier by the Heat), as well as former Lakers' teammate Shaquille O'Neal. Serving as a backup to Jason Williams, Payton averaged 7.7 points and started 25 of 81 games. In the playoffs, Payton did not start but averaged 24.3 minutes a game after averaging 28.5 minutes during the regular season, often playing during pressure situations in the 4th quarter of games. In Game 4 of the semifinals against the New Jersey Nets, Payton hit a critical three-pointer with 56 seconds left in the game to clinch the Heat victory. In Game 1 of the Eastern Conference Finals on the road against the Detroit Pistons, Payton scored 14 points on 6-of-8 shooting, helping the Heat set the tone in the series. Miami won the series in 6 games to reach the team's first ever Finals against the Dallas Mavericks. Miami lost the first two games in Dallas and trailed in the final quarter of Game 3 before a comeback led by Dwyane Wade culminated with a Jason Williams pass to Payton, who faked his defender and hit the game-winning jump shot to keep Miami from falling 3–0 in the series. In Game 5, Payton scored 8 points, including Miami's final field goal with 29 seconds left, to help clinch a one-point victory. The Heat returned to Dallas for Game 6 and won 95–92, securing their first and Payton's only NBA title.

On September 6, 2006, the 38-year-old Payton re-signed with the defending champion Miami Heat on a one-year, $1.2 million contract. During the subsequent 2006–07 NBA season, Payton continued to climb up several NBA all-time lists: he moved from 17th to 8th in all-time NBA games played, passed John Havlicek and Robert Parish to move into 7th in all-time minutes played, and passed Hal Greer and Larry Bird to become the 21st-highest scorer in NBA history.

== National team ==
Payton was a member of the gold medal-winning 1996 and 2000 U.S. Men's Olympic Basketball Teams.

== Player profile ==
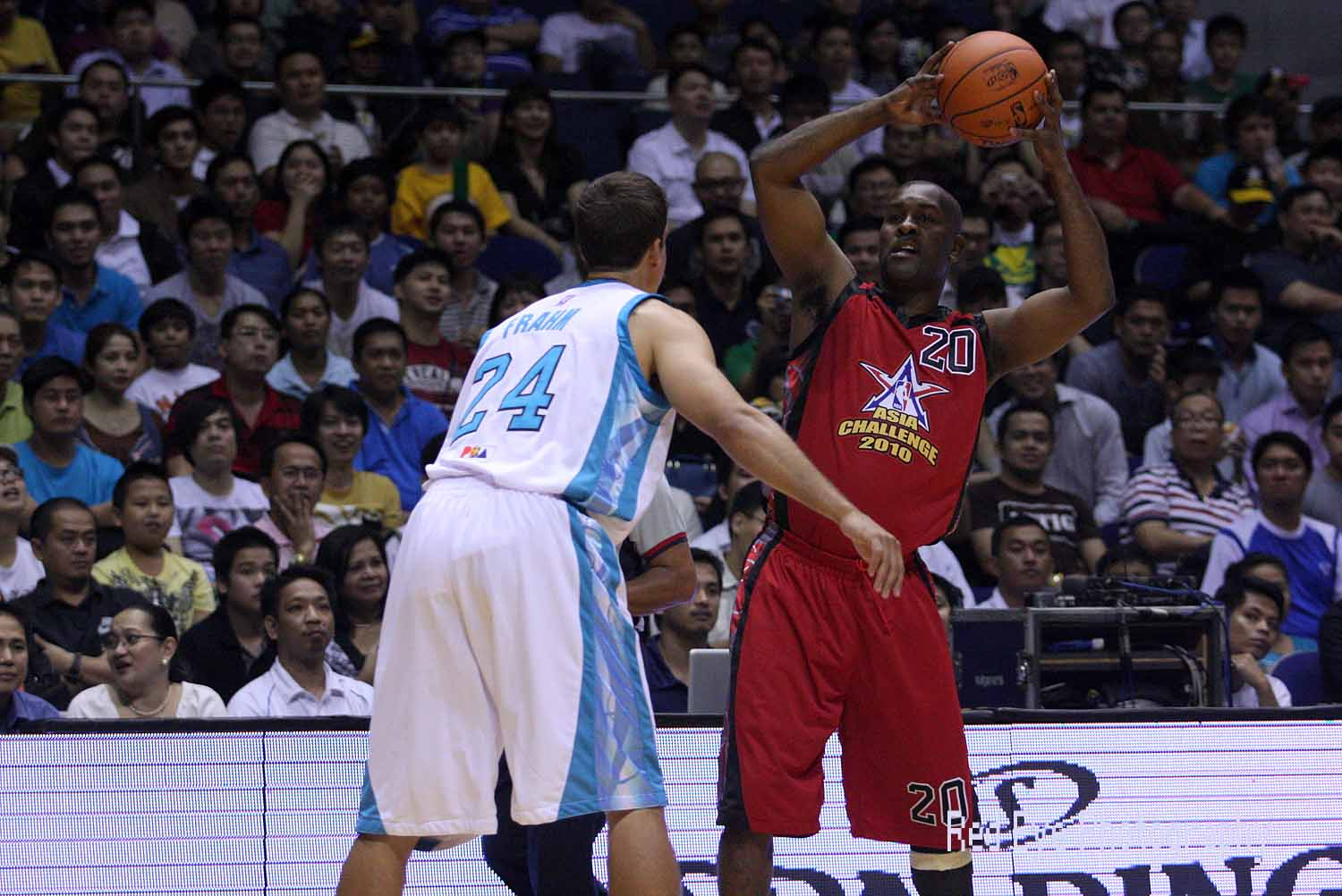
Payton playing in the NBA Asia Challenge 2010 in the Philippines

=== Personality ===
Payton is well known for his trash-talk. He received the fourth-most technical fouls of all time (behind Karl Malone, Charles Barkley, and Rasheed Wallace) with 250. Of his trash talking, Payton has stated "I never take it too far...I just try to talk and get their mind off the game, and turn their attention on me", adding that "sometimes I get accused of trash talking even though I'm not...[referees and spectators] immediately figure you're trash talking. But I could be talking to a guy about what's going on or asking about his family."

In addition, All-Star point guard Jason Kidd has referred to Payton as a "mentor" for the way he treated Kidd growing up in the same neighborhood of Oakland.

In 2001, he gave a humorous, televised "motivational speech" to his team during the NBA All-Star Game.

=== Playing style ===
Payton's nickname of "The Glove" in reference to his defensive skills was popularized during the 1993 Western Conference Finals series against Phoenix.

Since Payton's career ended in 2007, he has been mentioned among the all-time greatest point guards. Gail Goodrich, who played with Hall of Fame guard Jerry West, said "Gary Payton is probably as complete a guard as there ever was." Kevin Johnson considers Payton "certainly...amongst the best ever" and "just as intimidating...maybe even more so than all-time greats Magic Johnson, Isiah Thomas, Tiny Archibald, and Maurice Cheeks." When asked to classify the best players in each position of the late 1990s and early 21st century, NBA coach George Karl said of Payton, "I don't know who else you'd take at point guard. Some say Jason Kidd. Well, every time Gary went nose-to-nose with Kidd, Gary won that matchup."

Payton is ranked 35th all-time in points scored, and 11th in assists, but he is most widely recognized for his defensive contributions. The Sporting News said in 2000 that Payton was "building a case as the best two-way point guard in history", and asked "If you weigh offense and defense equally, is Payton the best ever?" When comparing Payton to the all-time greats, it has been said that "Payton arguably is the best defender of them all, and his offensive game is better than most."

His defensive prowess was once described by Kevin Johnson:

"You think of guys with great hands, like Maurice Cheeks and Derek Harper. Gary is like that. But he's also a great individual defender and a great team defender. He has all three components covered. That's very rare."

Offensively, Payton was not a particularly strong shooter, but was much more physical than most point guards of his era, preferring to use his 6 ft 4 in (1.93 m) body frame and strength to shield defenders on his way to the basket or posting up his opponent in an isolation play. Nonetheless, in his prime, Payton was the "NBA's reigning high scorer among point guards." In 2006, he was referred to as "obviously...one of the greatest clutch shooters of our time".

He earned his first of 9 consecutive All-NBA team selections when he was chosen to the All-NBA Third team in 1994. Payton would go on to make the All-NBA First-Team in 1998 and 2000, All-NBA Second Team in 1995, 1996, 1997, 1999, and 2002, and All-NBA Third Team in 1994 and 2001. He was selected to the NBA All-Defensive First Team a record nine consecutive seasons (1994–2002), and won the NBA Defensive Player of the Year Award in 1996, the first point guard to win the award. He has been selected to the NBA All-Star Team nine times and was voted as a starter in 1997 and 1998.

He was the only guard to have won the NBA Defensive Player of the Year award since Michael Jordan in 1988, until Marcus Smart received the award in 2022. Also, he, Jordan, Kevin Garnett, and Kobe Bryant share the record for most career NBA All-Defensive First Team selections, with nine. He is currently fifth all-time in career steals. Payton also ranks fifth all-time among guards in defensive rebounds though not alone, 12th in offensive rebounds, and 10th in total rebounds for a guard. Among players considered point guards, Payton ranks 3rd in defensive rebounds, 5th in offensive rebounds, and 4th in total rebounds, behind Jason Kidd, Oscar Robertson, and Magic Johnson. In 2021, to commemorate the NBA's 75th Anniversary The Athletic ranked their top 75 players of all time, and named Payton as the 48th greatest player in NBA history.

=== Payton vs. Jordan ===
Payton is also considered one of the best defensive opponents of Michael Jordan, and the two players had a high-profile rivalry that culminated in the 1996 NBA Finals. Jordan and Payton have both won the NBA Defensive Player of the Year award and despite their different positions (shooting guard and point guard respectively), they were well matched for other reasons. Both were prodigious "trash talkers" (Larry Johnson once named Payton, Jordan and himself the best three trash talkers in the league), had legendary competitiveness, and as the 1997 NBA Preview magazine stated, "Payton [was] quick, and strong as an ox", making him the kind of player who could frustrate Jordan defensively.

Midway through the 1996 NBA Finals, Seattle coach George Karl decided to assign Payton to defend Jordan, instead of his normal role defending the Bulls' point guards. Though the Bulls won the series, Seattle's (and especially Payton's) defense held Jordan and the Bulls to their lowest offensive output in an NBA finals and "frustrated the best player in the game." In a Game 5 preview after Payton had held Jordan to a career NBA Finals low of 23, an NBA pregame show described the rivalry of two strong defensive players renowned for their competitiveness.

"[In Game 4, Jordan had his] lowest output in a Finals game, much of it with Payton guarding him. Though afterwards, Jordan refused to give Payton credit, saying 'No one can stop me, I can only stop myself. I missed some easy shots.' The truth is, Jordan finds the NBA's Defensive Player of the Year [Payton] annoying. He views the [young Payton] as impudent, and he would love to have a big game at [Payton's] expense." (NBA on NBC Preview, Game 5)

The Sonics won that game by 21 points and Payton held Jordan to 26 points – Jordan's second-lowest-scoring Finals game in his career up to that point. In Game 6, which the Bulls won to capture the Championship, Payton played 47 minutes and Jordan missed 14 of his 19 shots, getting a career Finals low 22 points. Bill Walton, commentating for NBC at the time, said Payton "outplayed" Jordan during the second half of the series, and that Seattle coach George Karl would "rue" the decision to "hide [Payton] from 'the king'" in the early games of the series.

Later, of his performance that series, Payton said "You've got to get back at Jordan, you can't back down on him. If you do, he's like a wolf, he's going to eat everything. He knew I wasn't going to back down. I had to realize or see if he is really about being a dog, about this neighborhood stuff. I went at him. It was just me being me." In one notable trash-talking exchange, Jordan said 'You can't guard me, you know who I am? Black Jesus,' to which Payton responded saying 'Fu** you, Imma get in yo ass every time I come and play.'”

=== Durability ===
In his 17-year career, Payton missed only 25 games, and at one point held the longest active streak for consecutive games played, with 356; the streak ended in January 2001. The Sporting News noted in a 2000 article, "Durability always has been one of Payton's strong suits. He has missed only two games in 10 seasons and is generally counted on for nearly a full game's worth of nonstop motion, despite chronic back pain that requires extensive stretching and regular applications of heating packs."

== Coaching career ==
Payton was the head coach at Lincoln University in Oakland for three seasons before becoming the head coach of the nearby College of Alameda men's team in 2024.

== Off the court ==
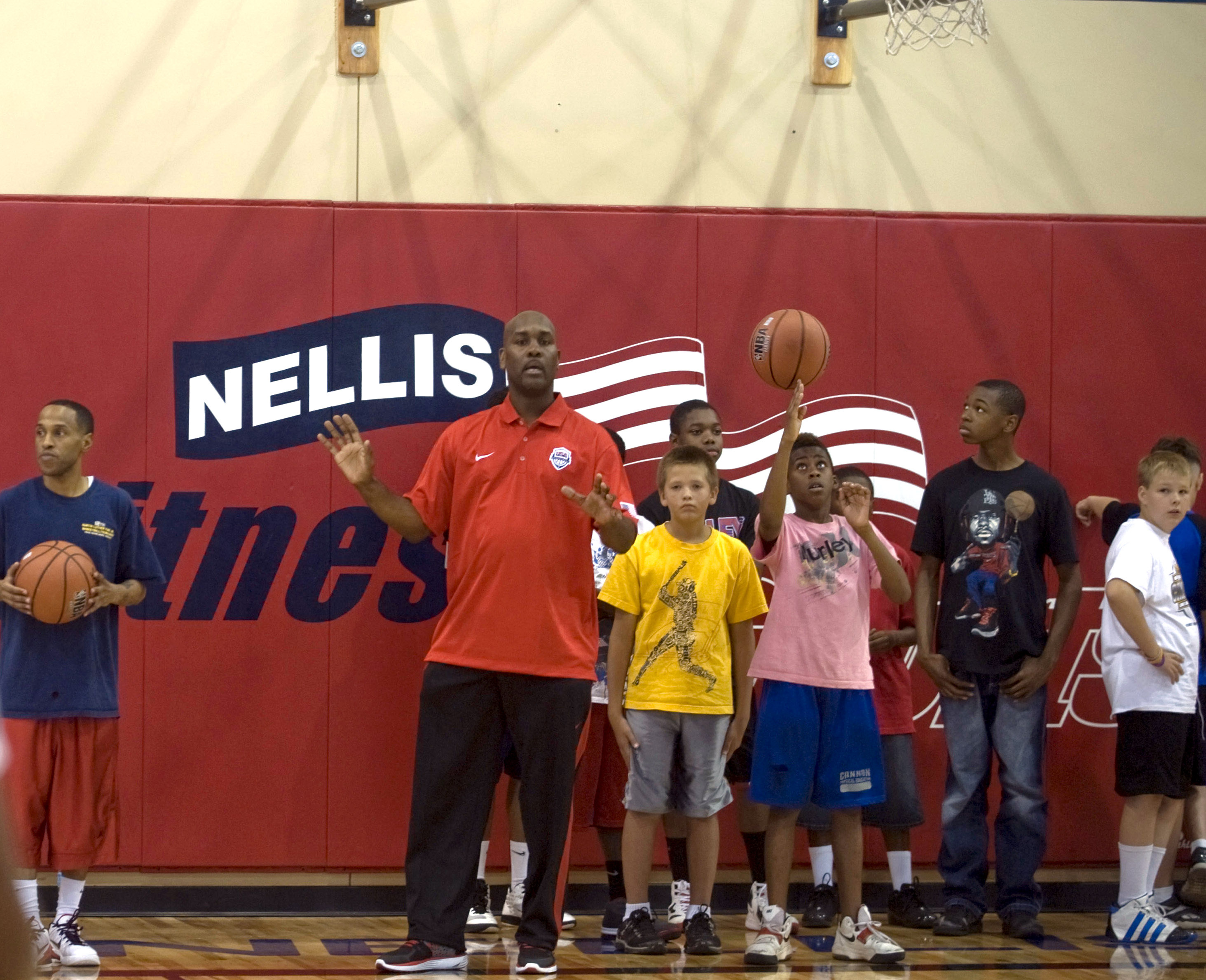
Payton instructing youth from the Nellis Air Force Base community during NBA Cares Hoops for Troops event, 2012

=== Personal life ===
Payton is the son of Al and Annie Payton. He married Monique James on July 26, 1997. They lived in Oakland and Las Vegas and have three children: Gary II, Julian, and Raquel. Gary II has played for the Milwaukee Bucks, Los Angeles Lakers, Washington Wizards, Portland Trail Blazers, and the Golden State Warriors, where he won the NBA Championship. Payton also has another son named Gary Payton Jr. with a different mother. His brother, Brandon, was also a professional basketball player during the 2000s.

Payton is cross-dominant: he was a natural left-handed player who shot with his right hand.

=== Post-NBA career ===
During the 2008–09 season, Payton served as a studio analyst for NBA TV and as an occasional substitute analyst on The NBA on TNT. He was replaced with Kevin McHale for the 2009–10 season. In 2013, Payton was named an analyst for Fox Sports 1's Fox Sports Live. For the 2016 NFL season, Payton provided weekly picks for Sports Betting Dime.

=== Movie and TV appearances ===
Payton has appeared in Eddie (1996), Like Mike (2002), The Lego Movie 2: The Second Part (2019), and also performed a speaking role in the 1999 comedy film The Breaks. He also appeared on The Jamie Foxx Show.

Payton appeared on Onion SportsDome.

Payton went on to feature in a 2016 documentary about NBA player Stephon Marbury titled Stephon Marbury: Remade in China by a cameo appearance.

=== Charity and community involvement ===
Payton has made numerous well-regarded contributions of both time and money to the community. He set up The Gary Payton Foundation in 1996 to provide safe places for recreational activity, and to help underprivileged youth in his hometown of Oakland stay in school. He hosts an annual charity basketball game as part of his foundation. Payton also gave back to the East Oakland Youth Development Center (EOYDC), a youth center that he attended in Oakland when he was growing up. In 2001, Payton donated $100,000 to renovate EOYDC's gym – his first big grant in his hometown of Oakland. Payton and his wife, Monique, have been active in fundraising endeavors for HIV awareness, and Payton has lent many hours and provided tremendous financial support to the Boys & Girls Club of America and the Make-a-Wish Foundation. Payton has also donated Miami Heat tickets to underprivileged children. For the Christmas of 2003 he took 10 families from the Ronald McDonald House in Los Angeles and let each of the over 40 children have a $100 shopping spree at FAO Schwarz. For Christmas, 2005, he gave 60 children $100 Toys-R-Us shopping sprees as part of the Voices For Children program. In 1999, he wrote an autobiographical children's book entitled Confidence Counts as part of the "Positively for Kids" series, illustrating the importance of confidence through events in his own life. In July 1999, Payton was named to The Sporting News' "Good Guys in Sports" list. Payton hosted a radio show in early 1998 on Seattle's KUBE 93.3 station. He played hip-hop including The Roots, Raekwon, Outkast, and Cam'ron. He did it for charity during the NBA lockout. During the 2021 NHL expansion draft for the Seattle Kraken, he made an appearance alongside former teammate Shawn Kemp.

=== Support of Seattle basketball ===
Since the Sonics' move to Oklahoma City, Payton has openly expressed his desire not to have his retired jersey number in Oklahoma City as part of that team's history. He wishes instead for it to remain in Seattle, where he enjoyed the majority of his career's success and popularity. This seems likely as the SuperSonics' team name, colors, uniforms and trophies are remaining in Seattle for a possible future team to adopt upon arrival. Despite no official acknowledgement from the Thunder, they have not issued the number 20 to any player since their relocation.

Payton is featured in the documentary Sonicsgate, which covers the team's relocation from Seattle to Oklahoma City. When Sonicsgate won a Webby Award for Best Sports Film, Payton gave the acceptance speech, which consisted solely of the five words "Bring back our Seattle SuperSonics."

Payton is currently working on bringing the NBA back to Seattle, aligning himself with the Oak View Group.

== Career statistics ==
Legend
GP	Games played	GS	Games started	MPG	Minutes per game
FG%	Field goal percentage	3P%	3-point field goal percentage	FT%	Free throw percentage
RPG	Rebounds per game	APG	Assists per game	SPG	Steals per game
BPG	Blocks per game	PPG	Points per game	**Bold**	Career high
†	Won an NBA championship	*	Led the league

=== NBA ===
==== Regular season ====
Year	Team	GP	GS	MPG	FG%	3P%	FT%	RPG	APG	SPG	BPG	PPG
1990–91	Seattle	**82***	**82**	27.4	.450	.077	.711	3.0	6.4	2.0	.2	7.2
1991–92	Seattle	81	79	31.5	.451	.130	.669	3.6	6.2	1.8	**.3**	9.4
1992–93	Seattle	**82**	**82**	31.1	.494	.206	.770	3.4	4.9	2.2	**.3**	13.5
1993–94	Seattle	**82***	**82**	35.1	.504	.278	.595	3.3	6.0	2.3	.2	16.5
1994–95	Seattle	**82***	**82***	36.8	**.509**	.302	.716	3.4	7.1	2.5	.2	20.6
1995–96	Seattle	81	81	39.0	.484	.328	.748	4.2	7.5	**2.9***	.2	19.3
1996–97	Seattle	**82**	**82***	39.2	.476	.313	.715	4.6	7.1	2.4	.2	21.8
1997–98	Seattle	**82***	**82***	38.4	.453	.338	.744	4.6	8.3	2.3	.2	19.2
1998–99	Seattle	50*	50*	40.2	.434	.295	.721	4.9	8.7	2.2	.2	21.7
1999–00	Seattle	**82**	**82***	**41.8**	.448	.340	.735	**6.5**	8.9	1.9	.2	**24.2**
2000–01	Seattle	79	79	41.1	.456	**.375**	.766	4.6	8.1	1.6	**.3**	23.1
2001–02	Seattle	**82**	**82**	40.3	.467	.314	**.797**	4.8	**9.0**	1.6	**.3**	22.1
2002–03	Seattle	52	52	40.8	.448	.298	.692	4.8	8.8	1.8	.2	20.8
2002–03	Milwaukee	28	28	38.8	.466	.294	.746	3.1	7.4	1.4	**.3**	19.6
2003–04	L.A. Lakers	**82**	**82**	34.5	.471	.333	.714	4.2	5.5	1.2	.2	14.6
2004–05	Boston	77	77	33.0	.468	.326	.761	3.1	6.1	1.1	.2	11.3
2005–06†	Miami	81	25	28.5	.420	.287	.794	2.9	3.2	.9	.1	7.7
2006–07	Miami	68	28	22.1	.393	.260	.667	1.9	3.0	.6	.0	5.3
Career		1,335	1,233	35.3	.466	.317	.729	3.9	6.7	1.8	.2	16.3
All-Star		9	2	20.8	.436	.273	1.000	3.3	8.1	2.1	.0	9.4

==== Playoffs ====
Year	Team	GP	GS	MPG	FG%	3P%	FT%	RPG	APG	SPG	BPG	PPG
1991	Seattle	5	5	27.0	.407	.000	**1.000**	2.6	6.4	1.6	.2	4.8
1992	Seattle	8	8	27.6	.466	.000	.583	2.6	4.8	1.0	.3	7.6
1993	Seattle	19	19	31.8	.443	.167	.676	3.3	3.7	1.8	.2	12.3
1994	Seattle	5	5	36.2	**.493**	.333	.421	3.4	5.6	1.6	**.4**	15.8
1995	Seattle	4	4	43.0	.478	.200	.417	2.5	5.3	1.3	.0	17.8
1996	Seattle	21	21	43.4	.485	**.410**	.633	5.1	6.8	1.8	.3	20.7
1997	Seattle	12	12	**45.5**	.412	.333	.820	5.4	**8.7**	**2.2**	.3	23.8
1998	Seattle	10	10	42.8	.475	.380	.940	3.4	7.0	1.8	.1	24.0
2000	Seattle	5	5	44.2	.442	.391	.769	7.6	7.4	1.8	.2	**25.8**
2002	Seattle	5	5	41.4	.425	.267	.586	**8.6**	5.8	.6	**.4**	22.2
2003	Milwaukee	6	6	41.8	.429	.067	.700	3.0	**8.7**	1.3	.2	18.5
2004	L.A. Lakers	22	**22**	35.1	.366	.250	.750	3.3	5.3	1.0	.2	7.8
2005	Boston	7	7	34.1	.446	.071	.833	4.1	4.6	.9	.1	10.3
2006†	Miami	**23**	0	24.3	.422	.293	.720	1.7	1.6	1.0	.1	5.8
2007	Miami	2	0	16.0	.000	.000	–	2.0	1.5	.0	.0	.0
Career		154	129	35.6	.441	.315	.706	3.7	5.3	1.4	.2	14.0

=== College ===
Year	Team	GP	GS	MPG	FG%	3P%	FT%	RPG	APG	SPG	BPG	PPG
1986–87	Oregon State	30	30	37.2	.459	.371	.671	4.0	7.6	1.9	**.7**	12.5
1987–88	Oregon State	**31**	**31**	**38.0**	.489	**.397**	**.699**	3.3	7.4	2.3	.4	14.5
1988–89	Oregon State	30	30	**38.0**	.475	.385	.677	4.1	**8.1**	3.0	.6	20.1
1989–90	Oregon State	29	29	37.8	**.504**	.333	.690	**4.7**	**8.1**	**3.4**	.5	**25.7**
Career		120	120	37.7	.485	.369	.684	4.0	7.8	2.7	.5	18.1

== Awards/accomplishments ==
=== NBA highlights ===
- NBA champion: 2006
- NBA Defensive Player of The Year: 1996
- 9-time NBA All-Star: 1994, 1995, 1996, 1997, 1998, 2000, 2001, 2002, 2003
- 9-time All-NBA:
  - First Team: 1998, 2000
  - Second Team: 1995, 1996, 1997, 1999, 2002
  - Third Team: 1994, 2001
- 9-time All-Defensive First Team member: 1994, 1995, 1996, 1997, 1998, 1999*, 2000*, 2001, 2002 (shares record for selections with Michael Jordan, Kevin Garnett, and Kobe Bryant)
  - * Highest vote getter in 1999 and 2000, second highest in 1998 and 2002
- NBA All-Rookie Second Team: 1991
- Led NBA in assists: 1999–2000 (732)
- Led NBA in steals: 1995–96 (231)
- Led NBA in three-pointers made: 1999–2000 (177)
- NBA 75th Anniversary Team: 2021

=== Other ===
- Two-time Olympic gold medalist with the United States national team: 1996 Olympic Games (Atlanta) and 2000 Olympic Games (Sydney).
- Ranked #39 on SLAM's Top 100 NBA Players of All Time in 2018.
- Ranked #10 on ESPN's Top 10 NBA Point Guards of All Time.
  - In a 2006 poll of 86,000 ESPN.com readers who were asked to rank the ESPN top 10 on various aspects of the game, Payton was considered "best defender" by 48.1% of respondents. Walt "Clyde" Frazier was second, with 11.8% of the vote. Payton and Frazier are the only two-point guards to be selected to more than 5 NBA All-Defensive First Teams (9 and 7, respectively), and two of only four players who were selected to 5 or more All-Defensive teams without ever being on an All-Defensive 2nd team (Michael Jordan and Dave DeBusschere are the others).
- In 2005, Payton was #1 on the list of best college point guards of the past 15 years by a reporter for College Hoops Net.
- In a 2008 Espn.com article, Payton was named the best #2 draft pick in NBA history during the "lottery era" (1985–present), ahead of Jason Kidd.
- Payton, who as of the end of the 2007–08 season was tied for 31st with 9 NBA All-Star game appearances, was a solid performer in All-Star games, leading his team in assists three times (1995, 1997 and 1998), and in points once (1996). Payton had the two highest single-game assist totals for NBA All-Star games in the 1990s (15 in 1995, and 13 in 1998). Upon his retirement, he ranked #6 all-time in All-Star game assists and #10 in All-Star game steals. He is also tied for #1 in All-Star game free throw percentage, having never missed a free throw in any of his 8 attempts. Payton was runner-up to Mitch Richmond for the 1995 NBA All-Star Game MVP award.
- In 2006, in commemoration of the NBA's 60th anniversary, TNT selected Payton among the next 10 players to be added to the list of 50 Greatest Players in NBA History.
- In the NBA's 100 Greatest Plays, Payton was responsible for the 4th greatest play in the "Hustle" category, passed to Kemp in the NBA's 5th greatest Alley Oop, and was also featured in the NBA's greatest steals segment.
- Payton has been on the cover of Sports Illustrated six times: three times as the featured cover story (in 1990, 1994, and 1996), and three times in a secondary role.
- Payton has appeared on the cover of SLAM two times – June 1998 and March 2003.
- The Seattle Mayor's Office declared June 6, 2000, as "Gary Payton Day".
- He had two streaks of 350+ consecutive games played. Payton played 354 consecutive games between January 16, 1992, and March 13, 1996. Five days later, Payton began his second iron-man streak playing in 356 consecutive games between March 18, 1996, and January 17, 2001.
- In 1999, Charles Barkley called Payton "the greatest player in the world."
- At the time of his graduation from Oregon State University in 1990, Payton ranked third in all-time NCAA steals and second in all-time NCAA assists.

== See also ==
- List of NBA career games played leaders
- List of NBA career scoring leaders
- List of NBA career assists leaders
- List of NBA career steals leaders
- List of NBA career turnovers leaders
- List of NBA career minutes played leaders
- List of NBA career playoff assists leaders
- List of NBA career playoff steals leaders
- List of NBA single-season steals per game leaders
- List of NCAA Division I men's basketball career assists leaders
- List of NCAA Division I men's basketball career steals leaders
