= Radenko Dobraš =

Serbian basketball player

Personal information
- Born: January 31, 1968 (age 58) Banja Luka, SR Bosnia and Herzegovina, SFR Yugoslavia
- Listed height: 6 ft 7 in (2.01 m)

Career information
- College: South Florida (1988–1992)
- NBA draft: 1992: undrafted
- Playing career: 1992–2001
- Position: Guard

Career history
- 1992–1993: Hapoel Tel Aviv
- 1993–1995: Hapoel Jerusalem
- 1995: Hapoel Tel Aviv
- 1995–1996: Alba Berlin
- 1996–1997: TSK uniVersa Bamberg
- 2000–2001: Hapoel Tel Aviv

Career highlights
- Israeli Basketball Premier League Quintet (1993); First-team All-Metro Conference (1992); First-team All-Sun Belt (1991); Second-team All-Sun Belt (1990); Sun Belt All-Freshman Team (1989); No. 31 retired by South Florida Bulls

Radenko Dobraš (born January 31, 1968) is a Serbian former basketball player. He played the guard position. He was named to the 1993 Israeli Basketball Premier League Quintet.

== Biography ==
Dobraš was born and grew up in Banja Luka, Bosnia and Herzegovina, then part of Yugoslavia. He is 6 ft 7 in (201 cm) tall.

He was a member of the Yugoslavian Junior National Basketball Team.

Dobraš attended the University of South Florida from 1988 to 1992, playing for the South Florida Bulls. He held the school's assist record for over a decade, with 534. He was on the Sun Belt Conference All-Freshman Team in 1988–89 when he led the conference in steals with 59, all-conference second team as a sophomore, first-team as a junior when he was fourth in the conference in points per game with 18.7, and Metro Conference first team as a senior when he was second in the conference in assists with 149. He was the MVP of the 1990 Sun Belt Conference men's basketball tournament. Dobraš had his jersey retired in 2002. He was inducted into the University of South Florida Athletic Hall of Fame in 2011.

Dobraš played for Hapoel Tel Aviv and Hapoel Jerusalem. He was named to the 1993 Israeli Basketball Premier League Quintet.
