= 1990 Sun Belt Conference men's basketball tournament =

- Classification: Division I
- Season: 1989–90
- Teams: 8
- Site: Birmingham–Jefferson Civic Center; Birmingham, AL
- Champions: South Florida (1st title)
- Winning coach: Bobby Paschal (1st title)
- MVP: Radenko Dobra (South Florida)

1989–90 Sun Belt Conference men's basketball standings
	Conf.				Overall
Team	W		L	PCT	W		L	PCT
UAB	12	–	2	.857	22	–	9	.710
South Florida †	9	–	5	.643	20	–	11	.645
Old Dominion	7	–	7	.500	14	–	14	.500
Western Kentucky	7	–	7	.500	13	–	17	.433
UNC Charlotte	6	–	8	.429	16	–	14	.533
Jacksonville	5	–	9	.357	13	–	16	.448
South Alabama	5	–	9	.357	11	–	17	.393
VCU	5	–	9	.357	11	–	17	.393
† 1990 Sun Belt Conference tournament winner Rankings from AP Poll

The 1990 Sun Belt Conference men's basketball tournament was held March 3–5 at the Birmingham–Jefferson Civic Center in Birmingham, Alabama.

South Florida defeated UNC Charlotte in the championship game, 81–74, to win their first Sun Belt men's basketball tournament.

The Bulls, in turn, received an automatic bid to the 1990 NCAA tournament, their first appearance in the Division I tournament. They were joined in the tournament by regular season champions UAB, who received an at-large bid.

== Format ==
There were no changes to the existing tournament format. All eight conference members were placed into the initial quarterfinal round and each team was seeded based on its regular season conference record.

== Bracket ==
Quarterfinals; Saturday, March 3
1	UAB	83
8	VCU	68
5	UNC Charlotte	91
4	Western Kentucky	67
3	Old Dominion	88
6	Jacksonville	94
7	South Alabama	78
2	South Florida	80

Semifinals; Sunday, March 4
1	UAB	57
5	UNC Charlotte	61
6	Jacksonville	59
2	South Florida	86

Championship; Monday, March 5
5	UNC Charlotte	74
2	South Florida	81

== See also ==
- Sun Belt Conference women's basketball tournament
